= List of violin sonatas =

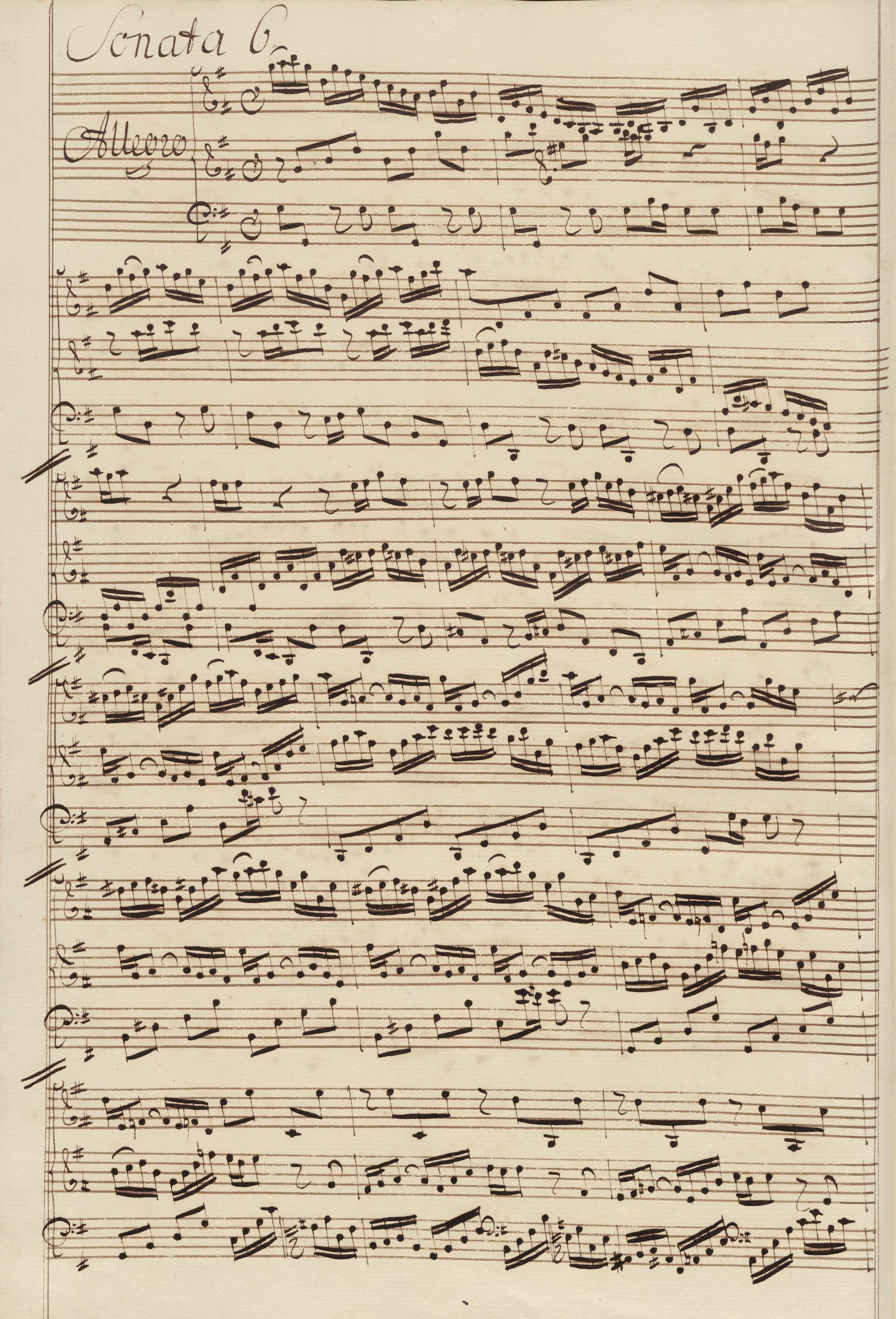
Manuscript of the first movement of J.S. Bach's Violin Sonata, BWV 1019, third version, copied by Johann Christoph Altnickol

A violin sonata is a musical composition for violin, which is nearly always accompanied by a piano or other keyboard instrument, or by figured bass in the Baroque period.

== List ==
=== A ===
- Tomaso Albinoni
  - Sonate da chiesa ("Op. 4") (for violin and basso continuo) (Amsterdam, c.1708)
  - [5] Sonate, violin and basso continuo, … e uno suario o capriccio … del Sig. Tibaldi (Amsterdam, c1717)
  - 6 sonates da camera, for violin and harpsichord, Op. Posth. (Paris, c.1740)
- Charles-Valentin Alkan
  - Grand Duo Concertant (sonata) in F♯ minor, Op. 21 (c. 1840)
- Kurt Atterberg
  - Sonata (for violin, cello, viola or horn, with piano) in B minor, Op. 27 (1925)

=== B ===
- Carl Philipp Emanuel Bach
  - 12 for violin with continuo and cello, five for violin and keyboard
  - Sonatas for violin and harpsichord BWV 1020, 1022
- Johann Christian Bach
  - Nine (Op. 10 and 20), also several flute sonatas that can be played with violin
- Johann Sebastian Bach
  - Solo sonatas BWV 1001, 1003 and 1005, included in Sonatas and Partitas for Solo Violin (1720)
  - Six Sonatas for Violin and Harpsichord, BWV 1014–1019
  - Sonatas for violin and continuo BWV 1021, 1023, and the doubtful 1024
- Béla Bartók
  - Early sonata for violin and piano
  - Sonata No. 1 for violin and piano, 1921
  - Sonata No. 2 for violin and piano, 1922
  - Sonata for solo violin, 1944
- Arnold Bax
  - Violin Sonata in G minor (1901) (recently recorded on ASV but a rarity) ()
  - Sonata No. 1 in E major, first version 1920/1, revised 1945 (, )
  - Sonata No. 2 in D major, 1915/1921 ()
  - Sonata No. 3 in G minor, 1927 ()
  - Sonata in F major (alternate version of his Nonet) 1940 ()
- Amy Beach
  - Violin Sonata in A minor (1896)
- Ludwig van Beethoven
  - Violin Sonata in A major (fragmentary) (1790-92)
  - Violin Sonata No. 1 (1798)
  - Violin Sonata No. 2 (1798)
  - Violin Sonata No. 3 (1798)
  - Violin Sonata No. 4 (1800)
  - Violin Sonata No. 5 (1800-01)
  - Violin Sonata No. 6 (1801-02)
  - Violin Sonata No. 7 (1801-02)
  - Violin Sonata No. 8 (1801-02)
  - Violin Sonata No. 9 (1802-03)
  - Violin Sonata No. 10 (1812)
- Richard Rodney Bennett
  - Sonata for violin and piano (1978)
  - Violin Sonata No.1 Op.50 (1999)
  - Violin Sonata No.2 Op.56 (2000)
- Heinrich Ignaz Biber
  - Mystery Sonatas for violin and figured bass
  - Sonatae violino solo (8 sonatas for violin and continuo) (1681)
    - Sonata, for violin & continuo No. 1 in A major
    - Sonata, for violin & continuo No. 2 in D minor
    - Sonata, for violin & continuo No. 3 in F major
    - Sonata, for violin & continuo No. 4 in D major
    - Sonata, for violin & continuo No. 5 in E minor
    - Sonata, for violin & continuo No. 6 in C minor
    - Sonata, for violin & continuo No. 7 in G minor
    - Sonata, for violin & continuo No. 8 in G major
  - Sonata violino solo representativa (Representatio Avium), for violin & continuo in A major, 1669?
  - Sonata, for solo violin in A major
- Ernest Bloch
  - Violin Sonata No. 1, 1920
  - Violin Sonata No. 2 Poeme Mystique, 1924
- Theodor Blumer
  - Violin Sonata
- Nimrod Borenstein
  - Sonata for violin and piano Op. 1 (1994)
  - Sonata concertante Op. 61 for violin and piano (2013)
- Johannes Brahms
  - Sonatensatz (sonata scherzo in C minor, for the 'F-A-E' Sonata collaborative sonata undertaken by Dietrich, Schumann and Brahms – 1853)
  - (early A minor sonata, lost, reported by Remenyi)
  - Violin Sonata No. 1 in G major, Rain Sonata, Op. 78, 1878–79
  - Violin Sonata No. 2 in A major, Thun, Op. 100, 1886
  - Violin Sonata No. 3 in D minor, Op. 108, 1886–88
- James Francis Brown
  - Sonata for Violin and Piano (2001. Rev 2003)
- Frank Bridge
  - Violin Sonata (1932)
- Ferruccio Busoni
  - Violin sonata (early) in C major, 1876 ()
  - Violin sonata Op. 29 in E minor, 1890
  - Violin sonata Op. 36a in E minor, 1898

=== C ===
- Samuel Coleridge-Taylor
  - Violin Sonata in D minor, Op. 28
- Aaron Copland
  - Violin Sonata (1943) ()
- Arcangelo Corelli
  - Violin sonatas with continuo (Op. 5, Nos. 1–12)
- John Corigliano
  - Violin Sonata (1963, some sources have 1964) ()

=== D ===
- Claude Debussy
  - Violin Sonata in G minor, 1917
- Frederick Delius
  - Violin Sonata published posth., 1892 ()
  - Violin Sonata No. 1, 1914
  - Violin Sonata No. 2, 1923
  - Violin Sonata No. 3, 1930 (, )
- Edison Denisov
  - Sonata for violin solo, 1978
  - Violin Sonata, 1963 ()
- Ernő Dohnányi
  - Violin Sonata in C♯ minor, Op. 21, 1913? ()
- Avner Dorman
  - Sonata No.1 for Violin and Piano, 2004
  - Sonata No.2 for Violin and Piano, 2008
  - Sonata No.3 for Violin and Piano, 2011
  - Sonata No. 4 for Violin and Piano, 2015
- Lucien Durosoir
  - Violin Sonata in A major, 1921 ()
- Antonín Dvořák
  - Violin Sonata in F major, Op. 57, 1880
  - Violin Sonatina in G major, Op. 100, 1893 ()

=== E ===
- Edward Elgar
  - Violin Sonata in E minor, Op. 82
- George Enescu
  - Violin Sonata fragment Torso
  - Violin Sonata No. 1 in D major, Op. 2
  - Violin Sonata No. 2 in F minor, Op. 6
  - Violin Sonata No. 3 dans le caractère populaire roumain (in Romanian Folk Style) in A minor, Op. 25
- Sven Einar Englund
  - Violin Sonata (1979) ()
- Iván Erőd
  - 1st Sonata op. 14 (1970)
  - 2nd Sonata op. 74 (2000)

=== F ===
- Gabriel Fauré
  - Violin Sonata No. 1 in A major, Op. 13
  - Violin Sonata No. 2 in E minor, Op. 108
- Mohammed Fairouz
  - Sonata for Solo Violin (2011)
- Zdeněk Fibich
  - Violin Sonata in D major
  - Violin Sonatina in D minor, Op. 27
- Grzegorz Fitelberg
  - at least two violin sonatas (A minor, Op. 2, F major, Op. 12: by 1905)
- Irving Fine
  - Violin Sonata
- Nicolas Flagello
  - Violin Sonata
- Josef Bohuslav Foerster
  - Sonata No. 1, Op. 10
  - Sonata No. 2, sonata quasi fantasia, Op. 177
- César Franck
  - Violin Sonata in A major, M. 8
- Peter Racine Fricker
  - Violin Sonata No. 1, Op. 12 (1950)
  - Violin Sonata No. 2, Op. 94 (1987)
- Robert Fuchs
  - Six violin sonatas
- Wilhelm Furtwängler
  - Violin Sonata No. 1 in D minor (1935)
  - Violin Sonata No. 2 in D major (1939)

=== G ===
- Niels Wilhelm Gade
  - Three sonatas: Op. 6 in A, Op. 21 in D minor, Op. 59 in B♭ major
- Hans Gál
  - Violin Sonata, Op. 17 (also at least one other) ()
  - Violin Sonata in D (1933)
  - Three Sonatinas, Op. 71 (1956)
- Friedrich Gernsheim
  - Four violin sonatas
- Joseph Gibbs
  - Eight solos (sonatas) for the violin and a thorough bass, 1748
- Philip Glass
  - Sonata for Violin and Piano
- Benjamin Godard
  - Four violin sonatas (No. 1, Op. 1; No. 2, Op. 2; No. 3 in D minor, Op. 9; No. 4 in A♭ major, Op. 12)
- Karl Goldmark
  - Violin Sonata in D major/B minor, Op. 25
- Edvard Grieg
  - Violin Sonatas No. 1 in F major (Op. 8), No. 2 in G major (Op. 13) and No. 3 in C minor (Op. 45)
- Jorge Grundman
  - What Inspires Poetry. Violin and Piano Sonata (2008)
  - Warhol in Springtime. Violin and Piano Sonata (2011)
  - White Sonata: The Child Who Never Wanted to Grow Up. Violin and Piano Sonata (2012)
- Camargo Guarnieri
  - Violin Sonata No. 1 (1930)
  - Violin Sonata No. 2 (1933)
  - Violin Sonata No. 3 (1950)
  - Violin Sonata No. 4 (1956)
  - Violin Sonata No. 5 (1959)
  - Violin Sonata No. 6 (1965)
  - Violin Sonata No. 7

=== H ===
- Reynaldo Hahn
  - Sonata in C major (1926)
- George Frideric Handel
  - Sonata for violin and basso continuo in D minor (HWV 359a)
  - Sonata for violin and basso continuo in A major (HWV 361)
  - Sonata for violin and basso continuo in G minor (HWV 364a)
  - Sonata for violin and basso continuo in G minor (HWV 368) (probably spurious)
  - Sonata for violin and basso continuo in F major (HWV 370) (probably spurious)
  - Sonata for violin and basso continuo in D major (HWV 371)
  - Sonata for violin and basso continuo in A major (HWV 372) (probably spurious)
  - Sobata for violin and basso continuo in E major (HWV 373) (probably spurious)
- John Harbison
  - Sonata No.1 (2011)
  - Sonata No. 2 (2013)
- Karl Amadeus Hartmann
  - Sonatas for violin solo
- Joseph Haydn
  - Sonata for keyboard and obbligato violin in B♭ major Hob:XVa:1
  - Sonata for keyboard and obbligato violin in D major Hob:XVa:2
  - Sonata for keyboard and obbligato violin in C major Hob:XVa:3
- Swan Hennessy
  - Sonate en Fa (Style Irlandais), Op. 14 (1905)
  - Deuxième Sonatine, Op. 80 (1929)
- Hans Werner Henze
  - Sonata for violin and piano (1946)
  - Sonata for violin solo (1977; revised 1992)
  - Sonatina for violin and piano (1979) [from the opera Pollicino]
- Paul Hindemith
  - Sonatas for violin solo, and four with piano
- C. René Hirschfeld
  - Sonata concertante for violin and piano (2006)
- Vagn Holmboe
  - Violin Sonata No. 1, M. 82, 1935
  - Violin Sonata No. 2, M. 112, 1939
  - Violin Sonata No. 3, M. 227, 1965
- Arthur Honegger
  - Sonatas Nos. 0–2
- Herbert Howells
  - Three violin sonatas
- Bertold Hummel
  - Violin Sonata, Op. 6 (1952)
  - Violin Sonatina, Op. 35a (1969)
  - Violin Sonatina, Op. 107a (2001)

=== I ===
- Vincent d'Indy
  - Violin Sonata in C major, Op. 59
- John Ireland
  - Violin Sonata No. 1 in D minor (1909)
  - Violin Sonata No. 2 in A minor (1917)
- Charles Ives
  - Four violin sonatas

=== J ===
- Leoš Janáček
  - Violin Sonata
- André Jolivet
  - Violin Sonata (1932)
- Paul Juon
  - Violin Sonata No. 1 in A major, op. 7
  - Violin Sonata No. 2 in F major, op. 69
  - Violin Sonata No. 3 in B minor, op. 86

=== K ===
- Karen Khachaturian
  - Sonata for violin and piano
- Erich Wolfgang Korngold
  - Violin Sonata in G major, Op. 6 (1912)
- Ernst Krenek
  - Violin Sonata in F♯ major, Op. 3 (1919)
  - Six sonatinas for violin and piano (without Op. number 61. 1921)
  - Violin Sonata No. 2, Op. 99 (1945)
  - Two sonatas for solo violin (Op. 33, 1925 and Op. 115, 1947)
- Toivo Kuula
  - Violin Sonata in E minor, Op. 1 (1907)

=== L ===
- Edouard Lalo
  - Violin Sonata in D major, Op.12
- Jean-Marie Leclair
  - Violin sonatas (at least Op.1, 2, 3, 4, 5, 6, 8, 9 and 12 are sets of sonatas, some alternately for flute)
- Benjamin Lees
  - Three Violin Sonatas
- Paul Le Flem
  - Violin Sonata in G minor (1905)
- Kenneth Leighton
  - Violin Sonata No. 1, Op. 4 (1949)
  - Violin Sonata No. 2, Op. 20 (1953)
- Guillaume Lekeu
  - Violin Sonata in G major (1892/93)
- Lowell Liebermann
  - Sonata for Violin and Piano, Op.46 (1994)
- Douglas Lilburn
  - Violin Sonata No. 1 in E♭ (1943)
  - Violin Sonata No. 2 in C (1943)
  - Violin Sonata No. 3 (1950)
- Franz Liszt
  - Violin Sonata (Duo) in C♯ minor, S 127 (1835)
- Pietro Locatelli
  - Sonatas for violin with continuo from Opp. 6 and 8

=== M ===
- Leevi Madetoja
  - Sonatina for violin and piano, Op. 18 (1913)
- Albéric Magnard
  - Violin Sonata in G major, Op. 13
- Edgar Manas
  - Sonata for Violin and Piano (1923)
- Bohuslav Martinů
  - Violin Sonatas 1, 2, 3
- Giuseppe Martucci
  - Violin Sonata in G minor, Op. 22
- William Mathias
  - Three violin sonatas
- John Blackwood McEwen
  - At least six violin sonatas (No. 6 published 1930 by Oxford University Press)
- Nikolai Medtner
  - Violin Sonata No. 1 in B minor, Op. 21 (1909-10)
  - Violin Sonata No. 2 in G major, Op. 44 (1922-25)
  - Violin Sonata No. 3 Epica in E minor, Op. 57 (1938)
- Felix Mendelssohn
  - Violin Sonata in F major, 1820
  - Violin Sonata in F minor, Op. 4, 1823
  - Violin Sonata in F major, 1838
- Peter Mennin
  - Sonata Concertante
- Peter Mieg
  - Sonata for violin and piano (1936)
- Darius Milhaud
  - At least two violin sonatas with piano, and one with harpsichord
- Ernest John Moeran
  - Sonata for Violin and Piano in E minor
- Wolfgang Amadeus Mozart
  - Violin Sonatas, KV 6–9 (for Keyboard and Violin) (1762-64)
    - No. 1 in C major (1762-64)
    - No. 2 in D major (1763-64)
    - No. 3 in B♭ major (1763-64)
    - No. 4 in G major (1764)
  - Violin Sonatas, KV 10–15 (for Keyboard with Violin or Flute, and Cello) (1764)
    - No. 5 in B♭ major (1764)
    - No. 6 in G major (1764)
    - No. 7 in A major (1764)
    - No. 8 in F major (1764)
    - No. 9 in C major (1764)
    - No. 10 in B♭ major (1764)
  - Violin Sonatas, KV 26–31 (for Keyboard and Violin) (1766)
    - No. 11 in E♭ major (1766)
    - No. 12 in G major (1766)
    - No. 13 in C major (1766)
    - No. 14 in D major (1766)
    - No. 15 in F major (1766)
    - No. 16 in B♭ major (1766)
  - Violin Sonata No. 17 in C major, K. 296 (1778)
  - Violin Sonata No. 18 in G major, K. 301 (1778)
  - Violin Sonata No. 19 in E♭ major, K. 302 (1778)
  - Violin Sonata No. 20 in C major, K. 303 (1778)
  - Violin Sonata No. 21 in E minor, K. 304 (1778)
  - Violin Sonata No. 22 in A major, K. 305 (1778)
  - Violin Sonata No. 23 in D major, K. 306 (1778)
  - Violin Sonata No. 24 in F major, K. 376 (1781)
  - Violin Sonata No. 25 in F major, K. 377 (1781)
  - Violin Sonata No. 26 in B♭ major, K. 378 (1779)
  - Violin Sonata No. 27 in G major, K. 379 (1781)
  - Violin Sonata No. 28 in E♭ major, K. 380 (1781)
  - Violin Sonata No. 29 in A major, K. 402 (1782; fragment, completed by M. Stadler)
  - Violin Sonata No. 30 in C major, K. 403 (1782; fragment, completed by M. Stadler)
  - Violin Sonata No. 31 in C major, K. 404 (1782; fragment, completed by M. Stadler)
  - Violin Sonata No. 32 in B♭ major, K. 454 (1784)
  - Violin Sonata No. 33 in E♭ major, K. 481 (1785)
  - Violin Sonata No. 34 in B♭ major, K. 372 (1781; fragment, completed by M. Stadler)
  - Violin Sonata No. 35 in A major, K. 526 (1787)
  - Violin Sonata No. 36 in F major, K. 547 (1788)
- Nikolai Myaskovsky
  - Violin Sonata in F major, Op. 70 (1946–47) ()

=== N ===
- Eduard Nápravník
  - Violin Sonata in G major, Op. 52
- Lior Navok
  - Violin Sonata
- Oskar Nedbal
  - Violin Sonata in B minor, Op. 9
- Carl Nielsen
  - Early sonatas
  - Violin Sonata in A major, Op. 9
  - Violin Sonata in G minor/C major, Op. 35
- Vítězslav Novák
  - Violin Sonata in D minor (his 27th work, unpublished "Novák worklist" (in Czech). Archived from the original on 2007-03-09.)

=== O ===
- Leo Ornstein
  - Violin Sonata, Op. 26 (1914–15)
  - Violin Sonata, Op. 31 (1915)
  - Violin Sonata, Op. Posth (Unfinished)

=== P ===
- Ignacy Jan Paderewski
  - Violin Sonata in A minor, Op. 13
- Niccolò Paganini
  - Numerous sonatas for violin with piano or guitar
- Hubert Parry
  - Fantasy-Sonata in B minor for violin and pianoforte (c. 1878)
  - Violin Sonata in D major (1889)
- Robert Paterson
  - Sonata No. 1 for Violin and Piano (2003)
- Dora Pejačević
  - Sonata for Violin and Piano in D major 'Frühlings-Sonate' Op. 26 (1909)
  - Sonata for Violin and Piano in B minor 'Slawische Sonate' Op. 43 (1917)
- Krzysztof Penderecki
  - Violin Sonata No. 1 (1953)
  - Violin Sonata No. 2 (2000)
- Wilhelm Peterson-Berger
  - Violin Sonata in E minor (1887)
  - Violin Sonata in G major (1910)
  - Violin Sonata in A minor (so far recorded only in cello transcription )
- Gabriel Pierné
  - Sonata for violin (or flute), Op. 36
- Johann Georg Pisendel
  - Sonata for violin and continuo in E minor
  - Sonata for violin and continuo in D major
  - Sonata for violin solo, in A minor
- Walter Piston
  - Violin Sonata (1939) ()
  - Sonatina for violin and harpsichord (1945) ()
- Quincy Porter
  - Two violin sonatas (and one posthumous)
- Francis Poulenc
  - Violin Sonata (1943)
- Gerhard Präsent
  - Sonata del Gesù op. 35 (1997–99)
- Sergei Prokofiev
  - Sonata for two violins in C major, Op. 56
  - Violin Sonata No. 1 in F minor, Op. 80 (1946)
  - Violin Sonata No. 2 in D major, Op. 94 (transcribed from flute sonata)
  - Sonata for solo violin in D major, Op. 115 (can also be played by massed unison ensemble.)

=== R ===
- Joachim Raff
  - Violin Sonata in E minor, Op. 73
  - Violin Sonata in A major, Op. 78
  - Violin Sonata in D major, Op. 128
  - Violin Sonata in G minor Chromatische, Op. 129 (One movement)
  - Violin Sonata in C minor, Op. 145
- Maurice Ravel
  - Violin Sonata No. 1
  - Violin Sonata No. 2
- Alan Rawsthorne
  - Violin Sonata (1958)
- Max Reger
  - Nine violin sonatas with piano, several unaccompanied (four in op 42, seven in op 91)
    - Violin Sonata No. 1 in D minor, Op. 1
    - Violin Sonata No. 2 in D major, Op. 3
    - Violin Sonata No. 3 in A major, Op. 41
    - Violin Sonata No. 4 in C major, Op. 72 (gave rise to a scandal at its premiere with a work by Ludwig Thuille)
    - Violin Sonata No. 5 in F♯ minor, Op. 84
    - Violin Sonata No. 6 in D minor, Op. 103b/1
    - Violin Sonata No. 7 in A major, Op. 103b/2
    - Violin Sonata No. 8 in E minor, Op. 122
    - Violin Sonata No. 9 in C minor, Op. 139
    - (violin version of the clarinet sonata in B♭ major, Op. 107 sometimes included, and the sonatas Op. 103b are sometimes not.)
- Carl Reinecke
  - Violin Sonata in E minor, Op. 116
- Ottorino Respighi
  - Violin Sonata in D minor (1897)
  - Violin Sonata in B minor (1917)
- Josef Rheinberger
  - Violin Sonata in E♭ major, Op. 77 (1874)
  - Violin Sonata in E minor, Op. 105 (1877)
- Ferdinand Ries
  - Violin Sonata in A♭ major, WoO. 5
  - Violin Sonata in E♭ major, WoO. 7 (Fragmentary)
  - Violin Sonatas, Op. 3, Nº. 1–2
  - Violin Sonatas, Op. 8, Nº. 1–2
  - Violin Sonata in B♭ major, Op. 10
  - Violin Sonatas, Op. 16, Nº. 1–3
  - Violin Sonata in E♭ major Op. 18
  - Violin Sonata in F minor, Op. 19
  - Violin Sonatas, Op. 30, Nº. 1–3
  - Violin Sonatas, Op. 38, Nº. 1–3
  - Violin Sonata in E♭ major, Op. 69
  - Violin Sonata in C♯ minor, Op. 71
  - Violin Sonata in D minor, Op. 83
- George Rochberg
  - Violin Sonata
- Guy Ropartz
  - Seven violin sonatas: No. 1 in D minor (1907), No. 2 in E major (1917), No. 3 in A major (1927)
- Nikolai Roslavets
  - Violin Sonatas 1–6 (3 and 5 lost)
- Albert Roussel
  - Violin Sonata No. 1 in D minor, Op. 11
  - Violin Sonata No. 2 in A major, Op. 28
- Edmund Rubbra
  - Violin Sonata No. 1, Op. 11 (1925)
  - Violin Sonata No. 2, Op. 31 (1931)
  - Violin Sonata No. 3, Op. 133 (premiered 1968)
- Anton Rubinstein
  - Violin Sonata in G major, Op. 13
  - Violin Sonata in A minor, Op. 19
  - Violin Sonata in B minor, Op. 98

=== S ===
- Camille Saint-Saëns
  - Violin Sonata No. 1 in D minor, Op. 75 (1885)
  - Violin Sonata No. 2 in E♭ major, Op. 102 (1896)
- Rosario Scalero
  - Violin Sonata in D minor, Op. 12
- Philipp Scharwenka
  - Violin Sonata in B minor, Op. 110 (by 1900)
  - Violin Sonata in E minor, Op. 114
- Xaver Scharwenka
  - Violin Sonata in D minor, Op. 2
- Johann Heinrich Schmelzer
  - Sonatae unarum fidium (1664)
- Florent Schmitt
  - Sonate libre en deux parties enchaînées (ad modum clementis aquæ) Op.68, vn, pf (1918–19)
- Alfred Schnittke
  - Violin Sonatas Nos. 1, 2, 3
- Johann Schobert
  - 2 Sonatas for harpsichord with violin ad libitum, Op. 1
  - 2 Sonatas for harpsichord, with violin obbligato, Op. 2
  - 2 Sonatas for harpsichord with violin ad libitum, Op. 3
  - 2 Sonatas for harpsichord with violin ad libitum, Op. 5
  - 2 Sonatas for harpsichord with violin obbligato, Op. 8
  - 6 Sonatas for harpsichord with violin ad libitum, Op. 14 (No. 1 with violin and viola ad libitum)
  - 4 Sonatas for harpsichord and violin, Op. 17
  - 2 Sonatas for harpsichord (or pianoforte) and violin, Op. 19 (posthumous)
  - 3 Sonatas for harpsichord and violin, Op. 20 (spurious, probably by Tommaso Giordani)
- Othmar Schoeck
  - Violin Sonata, Op. 16
  - Violin Sonata, Op. 46
  - Violin Sonata, WoO 22 (information from a recent Claves CD release informational listing )
- Franz Schubert
  - Sonatas for piano and obbligato violin (Sonatinas), Op. 137 (1816): No. 1 in D major (D 384), No. 2 in A minor (D 385) and No. 3 in G minor (D 408)
  - Violin Sonata (Duo) in A major, D 574 (1817)
- Ervin Schulhoff
  - Violin Sonata Op.7 (1913)
  - Sonata for Solo Violin (1927)
  - Violin Sonata No.2 (1927)
- Robert Schumann
  - Violin Sonata No. 1 in A minor, Op. 105 (1851)
  - Violin Sonata No. 2 in D minor, Op. 121 (1851)
  - collaboration with Johannes Brahms and Albert Dietrich in the F-A-E Sonata for Joseph Joachim (1853)
  - Violin Sonata No. 3 in A minor, WoO 27 – third and fourth movements from the F-A-E sonata (1853)
- Laura Schwendinger
  - Sonata for Solo Violin (1991)
- Roger Sessions
  - Sonata for Solo Violin
- Michael Jeffrey Shapiro
  - Violin Sonata No. 1 (1974)
  - Violin Sonata No. 2 (2009)
- Alexander Shchetynsky
  - Sonata for Violin and Piano (1990)
  - Sonata for Solo Violin (2009)
- Dmitri Shostakovich
  - Violin Sonata, Op. 134 (1968)
- Jean Sibelius
  - Violin Sonata in A minor, JS 177 (1884)
  - Violin Sonata in F major, JS 178 (1889)
  - Violin Sonatina in E major, Op. 80 (1915)
- Robert Simpson
  - Sonata for Violin and Piano, in two movements (1984)
- Fredrik Sixten
  - Sonata for violin and piano
- Nikos Skalkottas
  - Sonata for solo violin (1925)
  - Violin Sonata No. 2 (1940)
  - Sonatinas nos. 1–4 (1928–35)
- Ethel Smyth
  - Violin Sonata in A minor, Op. 7 (published 1887) (Not mentioned in the list of works linked to in the article but recorded on Troubadisc and noted in published articles- Dale's in Oct. 1949 Music & Letters.)
- Louis Spohr
  - Sonata for Violin and Harp in B♭ major, Op. 16
  - Sonata for Violin and Harp in E♭ major, Op. 113
  - Sonata for Violin and Harp in E♭ major, Op. 114
  - Sonata for Violin and Harp in A♭ major, Op. 115
  - Sonata for Violin and Harp in C minor, WoO. 23
- Charles Villiers Stanford
  - Violin Sonata No. 1 in D, Op. 11, 1877? (notes for another recording give 1880)
  - Violin Sonata No. 2 in A, Op. 70, 1898
  - Sonata for Violin with Piano Accompaniment, Op. 165, No. 1, 1919 (Lost)
  - Sonata for Violin with Piano Accompaniment, Op. 165, No. 2, 1919 (Lost)
- Wilhelm Stenhammar
  - Violin Sonata in A minor, Op. 19 (1899/1900)
- Richard Strauss
  - Violin Sonata in E♭ major, Op. 18 (1887)
- Freda Swain
  - Violin Sonata in G-minor (1947)
- Karol Szymanowski
  - Violin Sonata in D minor, Op. 9 (1904)

=== T ===
- Germaine Tailleferre
  - Two violin sonatas (first from 1921; the second, from 1951 a transcription of her violin concerto)
- Sergei Taneyev
  - Violin Sonata in A minor
- Giuseppe Tartini
  - Devil's Trill sonata and many others
- Georg Philipp Telemann
  - Methodical Sonatas for violin and continuo
  - Sonates sans basse and Canonic Sonatas, both sets for two instruments (e.g. violins)
- Alice Tegnér
  - Sonata for violin and piano in A minor (1901) (you can also find the music notes for both parts at this reference)
- Susan Trew
  - Sonata for violin and piano (1893)
- Eduard Tubin
  - Violin Sonata No. 1 (1936)
  - Violin Sonata No. 2 in Phrygian key (1949)
  - Solo violin sonata (1962)
- Joaquín Turina
  - Sonate Espagnole (1908)
  - Sonata No.1, Op. 51
  - Sonata No.2, Op. 82

=== V ===
- Ralph Vaughan Williams
  - Violin Sonata in A minor
- Carlos Veerhoff
  - Violin sonata op.47 (1982)
- Antonio Veracini
  - Sonate da camera [10], for solo violin, Op. 2 (Modena, c.1694)
- Francesco Maria Veracini
  - 12 Sonatas for recorder or violin solo and basso (no opus number, dedicated to Prince Friedrich August, before 1716, unpublished in the composer's lifetime)
  - 12 Sonatas for violin solo and basso, Op. 1 (dedicated to Prince Friedrich August, 1721)
  - 12 Sonate Accademiche for violin solo and basso, Op. 2 (1744)
  - Dissertazioni del Sigr. Francesco Veracini sopra l'opera quinta del Corelli [Dissertation by Mr. Francesco Veracini on Corelli's Opus 5]
- Louis Vierne
  - Violin Sonata in G minor, Op. 23 (1905-6? Premiered 1908.)(Catalog of Vierne's music)
- Heitor Villa-Lobos
  - Sonate-fantaisie No. 1 for violin and piano, Desesperança (Despair) (1913)
  - Sonate-fantaisie No. 2 for violin and piano (1914)
  - Sonata for violin and piano No. 3 (1920)
  - Sonata for violin and piano No. 4 (1923, lost)
- Giovanni Battista Viotti
  - Six published sonatas for violin and bass, Op. 4 (about 1788), six without Opus number. (Recorded on Dynamic S2002-4)
- Antonio Vivaldi
  - Twelve sonatas Op. 2, four solo sonatas mixed with two trio sonatas in Op. 5 and other various, such as the twelve Manchester Sonatas, rediscovered in the 1970s.
- Georg Joseph Vogler
  - Six Sonatas Op. 3

=== W ===
- Henry Walford Davies
  - Violin Sonata No. 1 in E♭ major (1893–95)
  - Violin Sonata No. 2 in A major (1893–95)
  - Violin Sonata No. 3 in E minor, Op. 5 (1894) (Note: Published by Novello as No.1.)
  - Violin Sonata No. 4 in D minor, Op. 7 (1896) (Note: Published by Novello as No.2.)
  - Violin Sonata No. 5 in F major (1899) (Note: Only the first two movements have been completed, the third movement is unfinished.)
- William Walton
  - Violin Sonata (1949/rev 1950)
- Carl Maria von Weber
  - 6 sonatas for piano and obbligato violin, J 99–104, Op. 10b (1810): F major, G major, D minor, E♭ major, A major, C major
- Mieczysław Weinberg
  - a violin sonatina, six sonatas with piano, and three solo sonatas
- Johann Paul von Westhoff
  - Sonata for violin and basso continuo (December 1682, published in Mercure galant)
  - Sonate a Violino solo con basso continuo (Dresden, 1694)
- Charles-Marie Widor
  - Violin Sonata No. 1, Op. 50 ("sonata for piano and violin", 1881)
  - Violin Sonata No. 2, Op. 79 (1907 rev. 1937)
- Józef Wieniawski
  - Violin Sonata (1860)
- Stefan Wolpe
  - Violin Sonata (1949)
- Charles Wuorinen
  - Sonata for Violin and Piano (1988)

=== Y ===
- Eugène Ysaÿe
  - Six Sonatas for solo violin, Op. 27

=== Z ===
- Carlo Zuccari
  - 12 Sonate per violino é basso ò cembalo Op. 1 (Milano 1747)
- Mathis Zielinski
  - Sonata for Violin and Piano, op.1 (2023)

== See also ==
- String instrument repertoire
- List of compositions for two violins
