= Mi-Young Park =

Korean-American violinist

Mi-Young Park 박미영
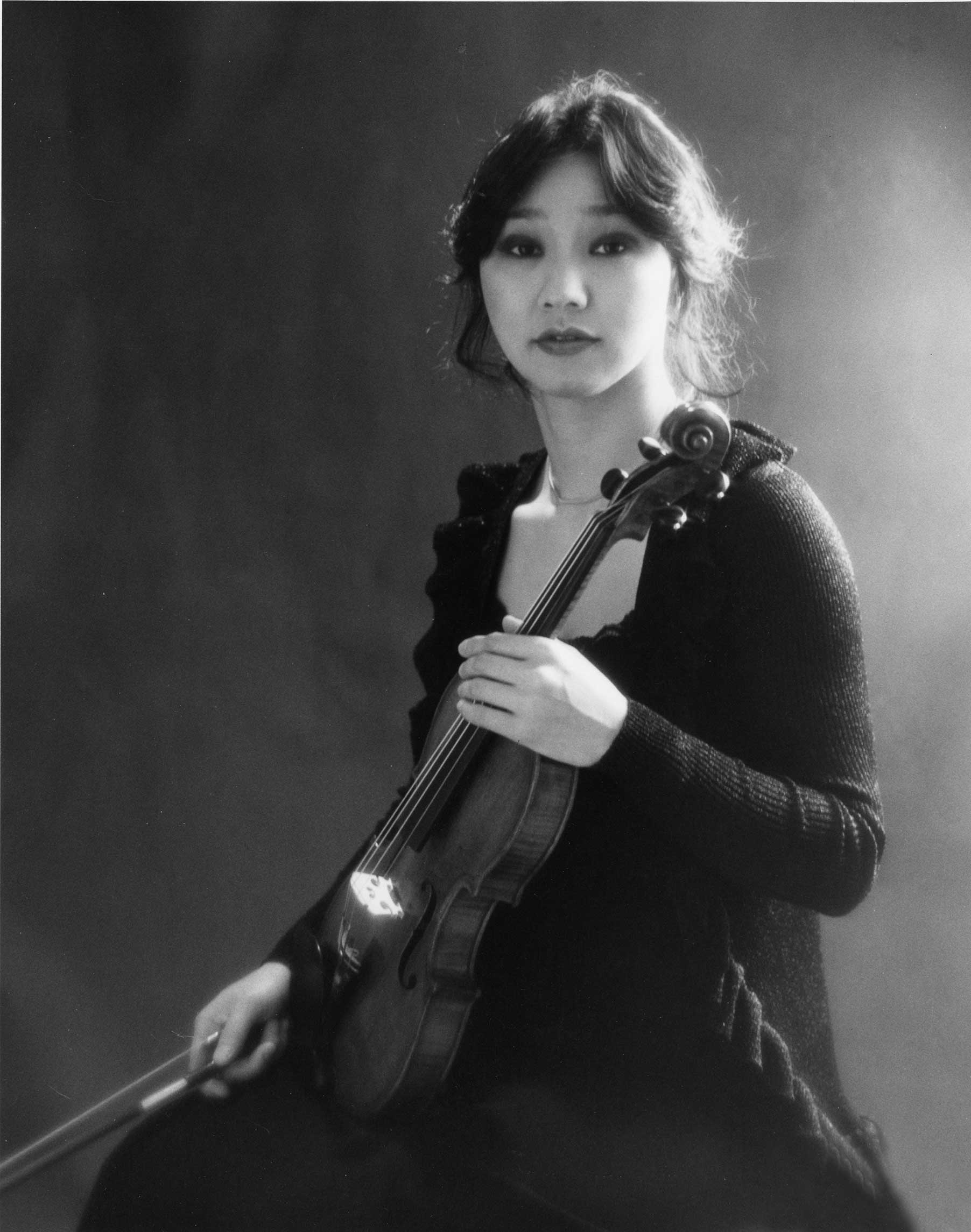

Background information
- Birth name: Park Mi-Young
- Born: October 30, 1948 (age 76) Seoul, South Korea
- Genres: Classical music
- Occupation(s): Concert violinist, recitalist
- Instrument: Violin
- Years active: 1955–2005
- Website: parksistersmusic.com

Mi-Young Park (born October 30, 1948, Seoul) is a Korean-American violinist. At age five, she began studying violin. She soloed with the Korean Broadcasting Symphony Orchestra and then with the Seoul Philharmonic after winning a top prize in the Korean National Music Competition. She concertized for 50 years with her sister, Pong-Hi, in a violin-piano duo known as The Park Sisters.

== Early life and education ==
In 1955, she performed at the presidential palace for President Syngman Rhee and First Lady Francesca Donner in celebration of the president's 80th birthday. At age fourteen, Park was accepted by Efrem Zimbalist, director of the Curtis Institute of Music in Philadelphia.

== Career ==
Park taught as part of the faculty of the New School of Music in Philadelphia and Dickinson College in Carlisle, Pennsylvania.

While attending Curtis and following her graduation, she played with Concerto Soloists Chamber Orchestra of Philadelphia and was frequently featured in 18th- and 19th-century violin concertos on the Orchestra's main concert series as well as on tour in the United States and abroad. A number of her performances were recorded live and archived.

At a relatively young age, Park limited the number of her performing engagements due to health issues. In 1986, she purchased a Giuseppe Guarneri del Gesu dated 1722 (Cozio 49179) that she played until her retirement in 2005.

=== Park Sisters ===
Much of her career was dedicated to performing recitals with her sister, pianist Pong-Hi Park. While still in grade school, they began playing recitals together that continued for 50 years. They concertized as The Park Sisters, performing a wide range of violin-piano repertoire first in South Korea and then in New York, Pennsylvania, New Jersey, Delaware, and Maryland.

== Personal life ==
Park lives with her husband, conductor Marc Mostovoy, in New Jersey.

== Recordings ==
Vitali - Chaconne in G minor
performed by the Park Sisters

Stravinsky - Suite Italienne for Violin and Piano - Pulcinella (ballet)
performed by the Park Sisters

With Chamber Orchestra of Philadelphia:

- Baillot – Air Russe Variations, Op. 24
- Clement – Concertino Brillante in F# Major
- Locatelli – Concerto in E Minor for Violin, Op. 3, No. 8
- Mozart – Violin Concerto No. 3 in G Major, K. 216
- Mozart – Violin Concerto No. 4 in D Major, K. 218
- Mozart – Violin Concerto No. 5 in A Major, K. 219
- Pisendel – Concerto in G Minor for Violin
- Schubert – Adagio and Rondo in A Major for Violin and Orchestra, D. 438
- Vivaldi – Concerto in G Minor, RV 577
- Vivaldi – Concerto for 2 Violins in G Minor, RV 517
- Vivaldi – Concerto for 2 Violins in D Major, RV 511
- Vivaldi – Concerto for 2 Violins in C Minor, RV 510

With Pong-Hi Park (as the Park Sisters):

- Beethoven: Sonata No. 8 in G Major for Piano and Violin, Op. 30, No. 3
- Debussy: La fille aux cheveux de lin [The girl with the flaxen hair]
- De Falla: Danse Espagnole [Spanish Dance] (arr. Kreisler)
- Dvorak: Sonatina in G Major for Violin and Piano, Op. 100
- Gideon: Air for Violin and Piano
- Gluck: Melodie (arr. Kreisler)
- Kreisler: Tambourin Chinois, Op. 3
- Leclair: Sonata Op. 9, No. 3 in D Major
- Mendelssohn: On Wings of Song, Op. 34, No. 2
- Mozart: Sonata in E Minor, K. 304, for Piano and Violin
- Mozart (arr. Heifetz): Minuet for Violin and Piano (from K. 334)
- Mozart (arr. Heifetz): Rondeau for Violin and Piano (from K. 250)
- Paderewski: Sonata Op. 13 for Violin and Piano
- Ravel: Piece en forme de Habanera
- Schubert: Serenade (Ständchen)
- Schubert: Sonata in A Major "Duo" Op. 162, D 574
- Schubert: Sonatina No. 1 in D Major, D 384
- Schubert: Sonatina No. 3 in G Minor, D 408
- Stravinsky: Suite Italienne for Violin and Piano
- Suk: Four Pieces Op. 17 for Violin and Piano
- Vitali: Chaconne

With Temple Painter (Harpsichord):

- Handel: Violin sonata in A major (HWV 361)
- Handel: Violin sonata in G minor (HWV 368)
- Handel: Violin sonata in F major (HWV 370)
- Handel: Violin sonata in D major (HWV 371)
- Handel: Violin sonata in A major (HWV 372)
- Handel: Violin sonata in E major (HWV 373)

== See also ==
- List of contemporary classical violinists
