= List of recorder music =

The recorder has a wide repertoire, both written expressly for it and also adapted for it.

Works for recorder include:

== By Jacob van Eyck ==
- Der Fluyten Lust-hof, 1644. A collection of about 140 melodies, each with a number of diminutions or variations, for solo soprano recorder.

== By George Frideric Handel ==
- Recorder sonata in A minor (HWV 362)
- Recorder sonata in C major (HWV 365)
- Recorder sonata in F major (HWV 369)
- Recorder sonata in G minor (HWV 360)
- Recorder sonata in D minor (HWV 367a)

== By Johann Sebastian Bach ==
- Flute Sonata in B minor, BWV 1030
- Flute Sonata in E-flat major, BWV 1031
- Flute Sonata in C major, BWV 1033
- Flute Sonata in E major, BWV 1035
- Flute Sonata in A major, BWV 1032
- Flute Sonata in E minor, BWV 1034
