= Violin Sonata in A major =

Violin Sonata in A major may refer to:

- Violin Sonata in A major, HWV 361 (Handel)
- Violin Sonata in A major, HWV 372 (Handel)
- Violin Sonata No. 22 (Mozart)
- Violin Sonata No. 35 (Mozart)
- Violin Sonata No. 2 (Beethoven)
- Violin Sonata No. 6 (Beethoven)
- Violin Sonata in A major (Beethoven)
- Violin Sonata in A major, D 574 (Schubert)
- Violin Sonata (Franck)
- Violin Sonata No. 2 (Brahms)
- Violin Sonata No. 1 (Fauré)
- Violin Sonata No. 2 (Stanford)
- Violin Sonata No. 1 (Ravel) (Sonate posthume)
