= Handel flute sonatas =

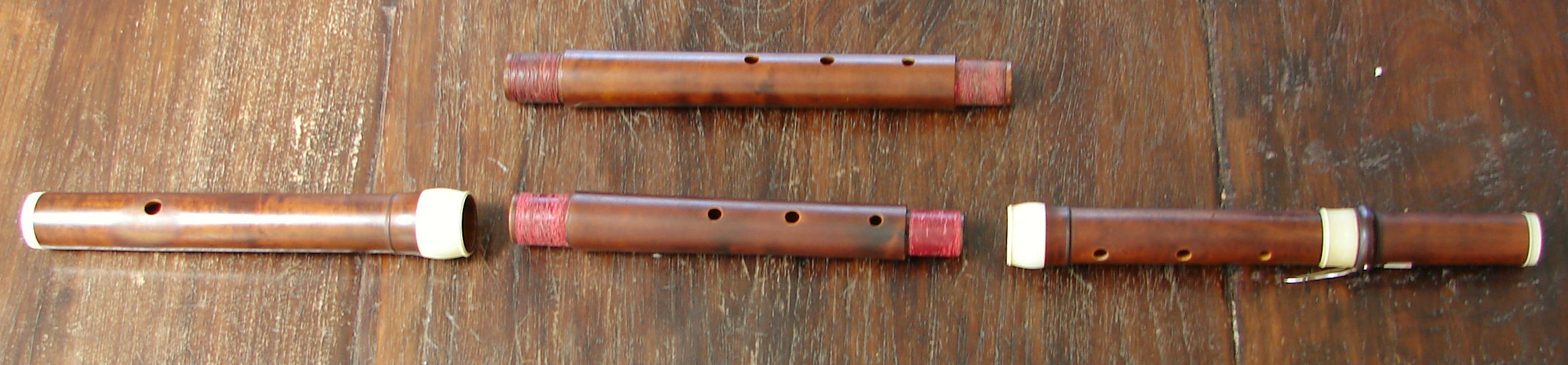
Traverso (baroque flute) by Boaz Berney, after an original by Thomas Lot, Paris, ca. 1740

It is impossible to say how many flute sonatas were composed by George Frideric Handel, but the correct number is somewhere between none and eight. There are many reasons for the confusion: some of the sonatas were originally written for other instruments, some have uncertain authenticity, some contain borrowings from other Handel works, and some were published (in an altered form) without Handel's knowledge. At least six of the sonatas are known to contain music written by Handel, although he may not have intended some of them to have been played by the flute.

The main source of the sonatas is the c. 1730 publication Sonates pour un traversiere un violin ou hautbois con basso continuo composées par G. F. Handel, allegedly by the Amsterdam publisher Jeanne Roger (who had died in December 1722), however the publication was made by the printer John Walsh. In 1732 Walsh published a revised version under his own name.

Three sonatas attributed to Handel were published by Walsh in 1730 as part of a collection titled Six Solos, Four for a German Flute and a Bass and two for a Violin with a Thorough Bass. It was supposed that they were early works composed by Handel before 1703 in Halle but their authenticity is now considered doubtful. The supposition of the date has been proven unfounded, at least for the second sonata, three movements of which are arrangements of music known to have been composed by Handel after 1712.

Of the eleven flute sonatas formerly attributed to Handel, only one (the flute sonata in E minor (HWV 379)) appears to have been intended for the flute as it exists in that form in Handel's autograph, and even that one is a hasty arrangement of movements from other works.

The flute sonata in D major (HWV 378), which was attributed in a manuscript to Johann Sigismund Weiss (brother of the lutenist Sylvius Leopold Weiss), has been proffered as a work by Handel, however no autograph version by Handel is known to exist.

== List of flute sonatas ==
The following are the eight candidates for being flute sonatas by Handel:

HWV	Key	Composed	Published	Opus	Notes
359b	E minor	circa 1724	1732	Opus 1 No. 1b	Originally composed as a violin sonata in D minor (HWV 359a).
363b	G major	circa 1711–1716	1732	Opus 1 No. 5	Originally composed as an oboe sonata in F major (HWV 363a).
367b	B minor	circa 1725–1726	1732	Opus 1 No. 9	Originally composed as a recorder sonata in d minor (HWV 367a).
374	A minor		1730		"Halle sonata No. 1". Authenticity uncertain.
375	E minor		1730		"Halle sonata No. 2". Authenticity uncertain.
376	B minor		1730		"Halle sonata No. 3". Authenticity uncertain.
378	D major	?circa 1707	1979		No autograph version by Handel is known to exist.
379	E minor	circa 1720	1879	Opus 1 No. 1a	The only sonata that survives as a flute sonata in Handel's own manuscript. Arrangement of movements from other works.

== See also ==
- List of solo sonatas by George Frideric Handel
- Handel solo sonatas (Walsh)
- XV Handel solo sonatas (Chrysander)
