= Recorder sonata in D minor (HWV 367a) =

Musical composition by G. F. Handel

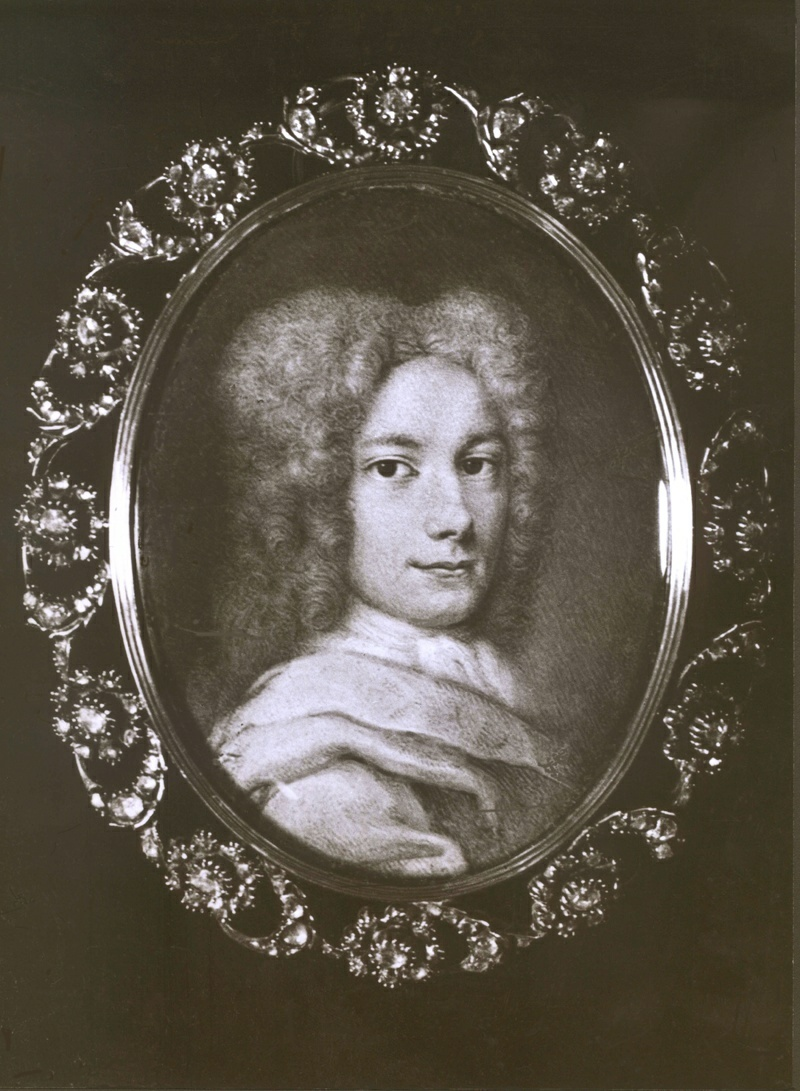
George Frideric Handel c. 1710

The Sonata in D minor (HWV 367a) was composed, circa 1709–15, by George Frideric Handel for recorder and basso continuo. The work is also referred to as Opus 1 No. 9a. Another catalogue of Handel's music refers to the work as HHA iv/18,19,45 (there is no HG designation for the work).

The autograph manuscript of the sonata is written on Italian paper, which was acquired by Handel during his travels in Italy between the end of 1706 and the end of 1709. Although he continued to use this paper until 1715, it is most likely that the autograph was written in about 1712. Handel's handwriting in this manuscript (and the one for the B♭ major recorder sonata) is much less careful than in the fair copies he made at about the same time as the four sonatas in G minor, A minor, C major, and F major.

The sonata was published by Walsh circa 1730, in an "incredibly botched" edition purporting to be from the Amsterdam publisher Jean Roger, arranged by an unknown hand as a flute sonata in B minor (HWV 367b), shorn of its third and fourth movements and designated "op. 1, no. 9". The Walsh firm reissued it in the same form and under their own imprint in 1731 or 1732. Although the Handel autograph manuscript does not indicate an instrumentation, the key and range are consistent with the recorder, and both an earlier autograph of the sixth movement and a contemporary non-autograph manuscript of the entire sonata are headed "Sonata a Flauto e Cembalo".

Both the Walsh edition and the Chrysander edition indicate that the work is for traversa (the Italian word customarily used in the 18th century for the transverse flute), and published it as Sonata IX (in B minor).

Movements I thru V were published as the "Fitzwilliam Sonata No. III" edited by Thurston Dart.

A typical performance of the work takes about fourteen-and-a-half minutes.

== Movements ==
The work consists of seven movements:

	Tempo	Key	Meter	Bars	Notes
I	Largo	D minor	4/4	19	
II	Vivace	D minor	3/2	63	
III	Presto	D minor	4/4	34	
IV	Adagio	D minor	3/4	21	
V	Alla breve	D minor	4/4	97	In cut-common time.
VI	Andante	D minor	4/4	20	Two sections (8 and 12 bars)—each with repeat markings.
VII	A tempo di menuet	D minor	6/8	19	Two sections (8 and 11 bars)—each with repeat markings.

(Movements do not contain repeat markings unless indicated. The number of bars is taken from the Chrysander edition, and is the raw number in the manuscript—not including repeat markings.)

== See also ==
- List of solo sonatas by George Frideric Handel
- XV Handel solo sonatas (publication by Chrysander)
- Handel solo sonatas (publication by Walsh)
