= Violin Sonata in G minor =

Violin Sonata in G minor may refer to:

- Violin sonata in G minor (HWV 364a) (Handel)
- Violin sonata in G minor (HWV 368) (Handel)
- Violin Sonata in G minor (Tartini)
- No. 3 from the Violin Sonatas, Op. 137 (Schubert)
