= Oboe sonata in C minor (HWV 366) =

Oboe sonata by George Frideric Handel

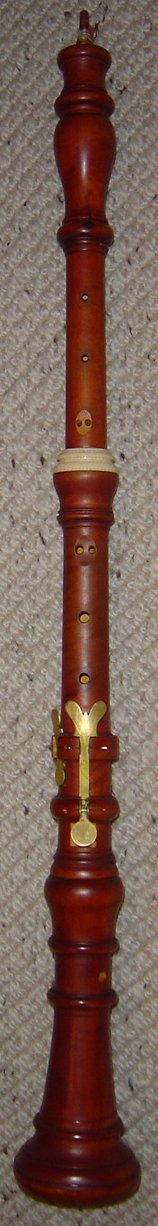
Baroque oboe, Stanesby copy

The Oboe sonata in C minor (HWV 366) was composed (c. 1711–1712) by George Frideric Handel for oboe and basso continuo. The work is also referred to as Opus 1 No. 8, and was first published in 1732 by Walsh. Other catalogues of Handel's music have referred to the work as HG xxvii, 29; and HHA iv/18,32.

Both the Walsh edition and the Chrysander edition indicate that the work is for oboe (Hoboy), and published it as Sonata VIII.

A typical performance of the work takes about six and a half minutes.

== Movements ==
The work consists of four movements:

	Tempo	Key	Meter	Bars	Notes
I	Largo	C minor	4/4	18	The key signature only has two flats (with the A♭ needed to establish the key of C minor being written-in as accidentals). The tempo of Largo is not written (but is stylistically assumed in performance). Concludes with a G major chord. The movement is also used in the flute sonata in E minor (HWV 375).
II	Allegro	C minor	4/4	45	Has a fugal beginning. The movement is also used in the flute sonata in E minor (HWV 375).
III	Adagio	E♭ major	3/2	30	Concludes with a G major chord.
IV	Allegro	C minor	4/4	20	Two sections (8 and 12 bars)—each with repeat markings. The movement begins G major. In Bourrée style.

(Movements do not contain repeat markings unless indicated. The number of bars is taken from the Chrysander edition, and is the raw number in the manuscript—not including repeat markings.)

== See also ==
- List of solo sonatas by George Frideric Handel
- XV Handel solo sonatas (publication by Chrysander)
- Handel solo sonatas (publication by Walsh)
