= Violin Sonata in F minor =

Violin Sonata in F minor may refer to:

- Violin Sonata No. 10 (Ries)
- Violin Sonata in F minor (Mendelssohn)
- No. 1 of the Violin Sonatas, Op. 120 (Brahms), arranged from the Clarinet Sonatas, Op. 120
- Violin Sonata No. 2 (Enescu)
- Violin Sonata No. 1 (Prokofiev)
