= Flute sonata in G major (HWV 363b) =

Musical composition by G. F. Handel

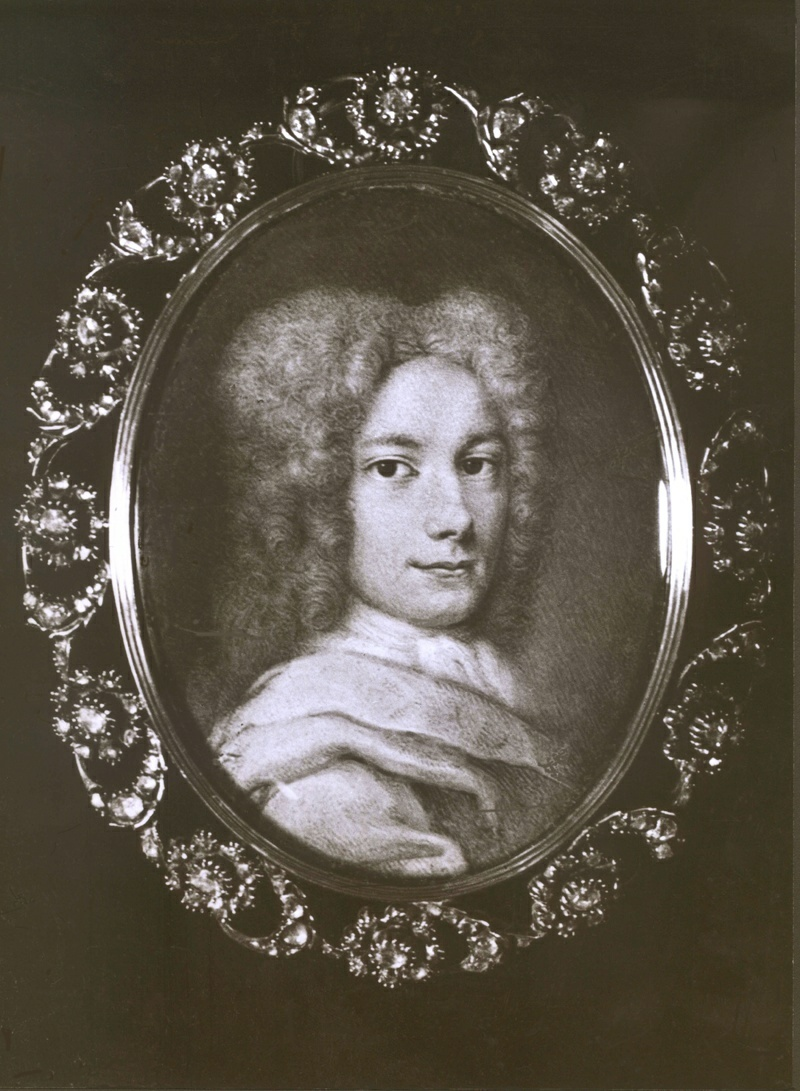
George Frideric Handel c. 1710

The Flute sonata in G major (HWV 363b) was composed (c. 1711–16) by George Frideric Handel in F major for the oboe, and was transposed by an unknown hand to G major, for flute and basso continuo. The work is also referred to as Opus 1 No. 5, as it was first published in 1726 or slightly later by the London publisher Walsh, in an edition falsely attributed to Jeanne Roger of Amsterdam. Other catalogues of Handel's music have referred to the work as HG xxvii, 19; and HHA iv/3,28. The sonata was originally composed as an oboe sonata in F major (HWV 363a).

Both of the Walsh editions and the Chrysander edition (based on Walsh) indicate that the work is for flute ("traversiere" or "traverso"), and published it as Sonata V.

A typical performance of the work takes about seven and a half minutes.

== Movements ==
The work consists of five movements:

	Tempo	Key	Meter	Bars	Notes
I	Adagio	G major	4/4	16	Concludes with a B major chord.
II	Allegro	G major	4/4	53	Begins in fugal form—with the bass answering the melody in bar 5.
III	Adagio	E minor	3/4	43	Starts with a ground bass, however the movement develops to absorb the bass texture into the music as a whole. Concludes with a B major chord.
IV	Bourrée	G major	4/4	22	Two sections (8 and 14 bars)—each with repeat markings.
V	Minuet	G major	3/4	24	Two sections (8 and 16 bars)—each with repeat markings.Based on a favourite theme of Handel's.

(Movements do not contain repeat markings unless indicated. The number of bars is taken from the Chrysander edition, and is the raw number in the manuscript—not including repeat markings.)

== See also ==
- Handel flute sonatas
- List of solo sonatas by George Frideric Handel
- XV Handel solo sonatas (publication by Chrysander)
- Handel solo sonatas (publication by Walsh)
