= Flute sonata in B minor (HWV 367b) =

Musical composition by G. F. Handel

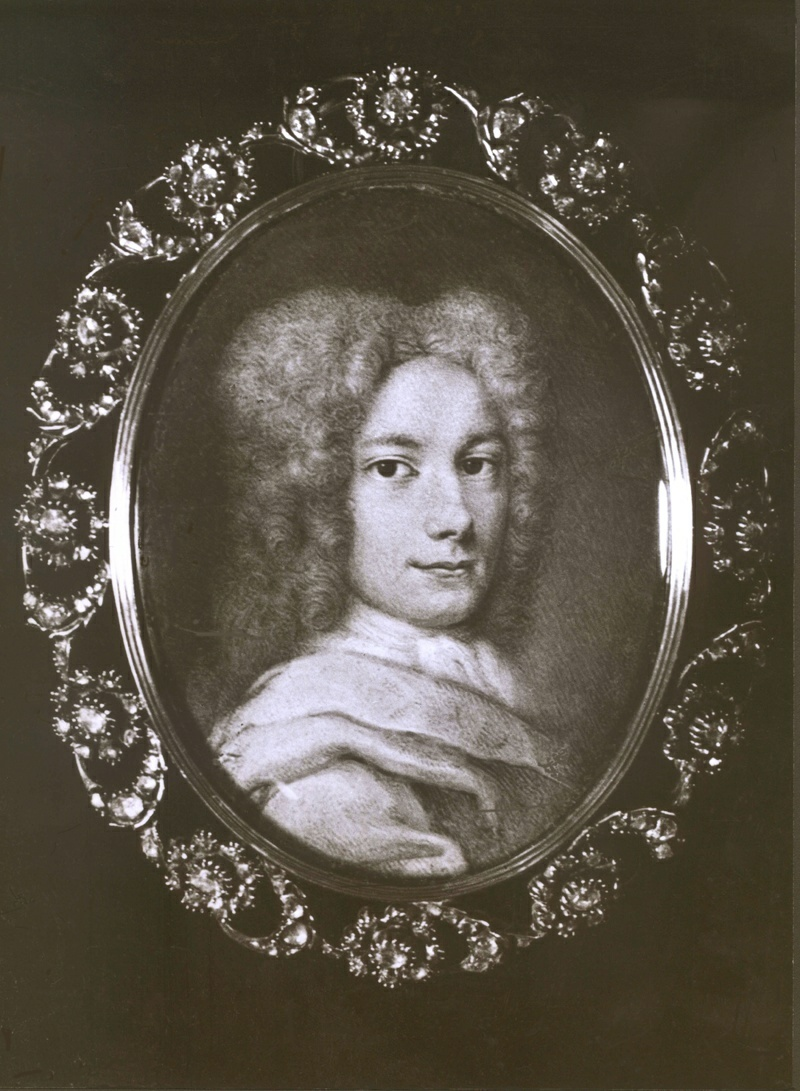
Handel c. 1710

The Flute sonata in B minor (HWV 367b) is a work for flute and basso continuo, however the sonata was originally composed (c. 1712) by George Frideric Handel as the Recorder sonata in D minor (HWV 367a). Other catalogues of Handel's music have referred to the work as HG xxvii, 32; and HHA iv/3,42.

The work was first published as "Opus 1, No. 9" in 1730 in an unauthorised and "disgracefully botched" edition—in fact by John Walsh of London but with a forged title page claiming Jeanne Roger of Amsterdam as the publisher—in which it was transposed to B minor for flute from its original key of D minor, and with its third and fourth movements omitted.

Both the Walsh editions and the Chrysander edition indicate that the work is for flute ("Traversa"), and published it as Sonata IX.

The work is the most developed and expansive of all Handel's sonatas that can be said to be for the flute. A typical performance of the work takes about fourteen and a half minutes.

For details about the movements in the sonata, see the movements section of the Recorder sonata in D minor (HWV 367a).

== See also ==
- Handel flute sonatas
- List of solo sonatas by George Frideric Handel
- XV Handel solo sonatas (publication by Chrysander)
- Handel solo sonatas (publication by Walsh)
