= Violin Sonata in E-flat major =

Violin Sonata in E-flat major may refer to:

- Violin Sonata in E-flat major, KV 26, see Violin Sonatas, KV 26–31 (Mozart)
- Violin Sonata in E-flat major (Ries)
- No. 2 of the Violin Sonatas, Op. 120 (Brahms), arranged from the Clarinet Sonatas, Op. 120
- Violin Sonata (Strauss)
