= XV Handel solo sonatas (Chrysander) =

Music collection published in 1879

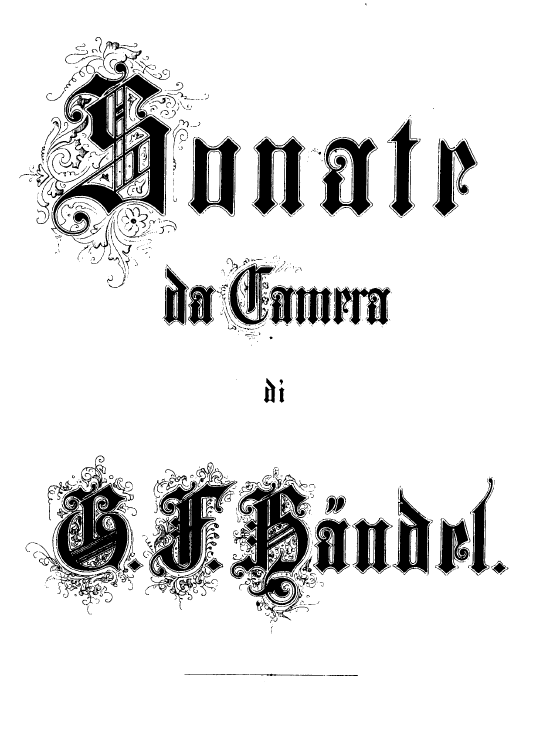
Cover.

XV Solos for a German Flute, Hoboy, or Violin with a Thorough Bass for the Harpsichord or Bass Violin was published by Friedrich Chrysander in 1879. The 72-page volume contains sonatas, for various instruments, composed by or attributed to George Frideric Handel. The words on the cover of the publication are: Sonate da Camera di G.F.Handel. The publication includes all the sonatas as published by Walsh in 1732; and those sonatas, as well as extras included by Chrysander, include the body of work that is known as Handel's "Opus 1".

In addition to the 15 sonatas indicated by the title of the publication, Chrysander appended the scores of four additional sonatas, making nineteen in all. The first sixteen sonatas (I^{a}, I^{b}, and numbers II to XV) were included as part of the HG volume 27. Sonata VI and the final four sonatas were included as part of HG volume 48 (pp. 112–139).

The musical instrument mentioned at the start of each sonata does not always match the instrument for which the work was originally written by Handel, however Chrysander was aware that the sale of the publication would be enhanced by the inclusion of a wide variety of instruments.

Each sonata displays the melody and bass lines—with the expectation that a competent keyboard player would improvise the omitted inner parts based on the figured bass markings.

Despite the title, there are five instruments mentioned in the work: the Western concert flute, the recorder, the oboe, the violin, and the viola da gamba.

== Summary ==
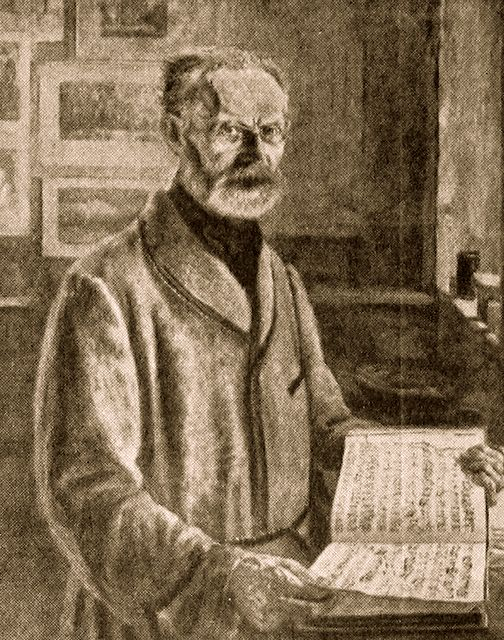
Friedrich Chrysander

The following table lists each of the sonatas included by Chrysander in his publication of 1879, as well as information about the instrument, the key, and the original sonata by Handel.

Sonata Title	Page	Instrument	Key signature	Handel's sonata
Sonata I^{a}	2	Flute	E minor	Flute sonata in E minor (HWV 379). (This version was not present in the Walsh publication.)
Sonata I^{b}	6	Flute	E minor	Flute sonata in E minor (HWV 359b).
Sonata II	9	Recorder	G minor	Recorder sonata in G minor (HWV 360).
Sonata III	12	Violin	A major	Violin sonata in A major (HWV 361).
Sonata IV	15	Recorder	A minor	Recorder sonata in A minor (HWV 362).
Sonata V	19	Flute	G major	Flute sonata in G major (HWV 363b).
Sonata VI	22	Oboe	G minor	Violin sonata in G minor (HWV 364a).
Sonata VII	25	Recorder	C major	Recorder sonata in C major (HWV 365).
Sonata VIII	29	Oboe	C minor	Oboe sonata in C minor (HWV 366).
Sonata IX	32	Flute	B minor	Flute sonata in B minor (HWV 367b). Chrysander published what is now considered to be Handel's Opus 1 No. 9b. (Handel's Opus 1 No. 9a is the Recorder sonata in D minor (HWV 367a).)
Sonata X	37	Violin	G minor	Violin sonata in G minor (HWV 368). Probably spurious.
Sonata XI	40	Recorder	F major	Recorder sonata in F major (HWV 369).
Sonata XII	42	Violin	F major	Violin sonata in F major (HWV 370). Probably spurious.
Sonata XIII	47	Violin	D major	Violin sonata in D major (HWV 371). Not published by Walsh—the designation of Opus 1 No. 13 is by Chrysander.
Sonata XIV	51	Violin	A major	Violin sonata in A major (HWV 372). Published by Walsh ca. 1730 (pseudo-Roger) as op. 1, no. 10—the designation of Opus 1 No. 14 is by Chrysander. Probably spurious.
Sonata XV	54	Violin	E major	Violin sonata in E major (HWV 373). Published by Walsh ca. 1730 (pseudo-Roger) as op. 1, no. 12—the designation of Opus 1 No. 15 is by Chrysander. Probably spurious.
Sonata XVI	57	Flute	A minor	Flute sonata in A minor (HWV 374). In this publication the work is sub-titled "(v. Sonata I — XV: vol. 27, pag. 1 — 56)". Of doubtful authenticity. Also known as "Halle sonata No. 1". No. 1 of Six Solos, Four for a German Flute … Compos’d by Mr Handel, Sigr Geminiani, Sigr Somis, Sigr Brivio (London, 1730).
Sonata XVII	61	Flute	E minor	Flute sonata in E minor (HWV 375). Doubtful authenticity. Also known as "Halle sonata No. 2". No. 2 of Six Solos, Four for a German Flute … Compos’d by Mr Handel, Sigr Geminiani, Sigr Somis, Sigr Brivio (London, 1730). Movements 1–2 from HWV 366; movement 4 = keyboard minuet in G minor.
Sonata XVIII	64	Flute	B minor	Flute sonata in B minor (HWV 376). Doubtful authenticity. Also known as "Halle sonata No. 3". No. 3 of Six Solos, Four for a German Flute … Compos’d by Mr Handel, Sigr Geminiani, Sigr Somis, Sigr Brivio (London, 1730).
Sonata	67	Viola da Gamba	C major	No HWV number (spurious—possibly by J.M. Leffloth). For an unknown reason, Chrysander omitted the "XIX" from the title of the sonata. The bass is not figured. The work was also published in HG xlviii,112.

== See also ==
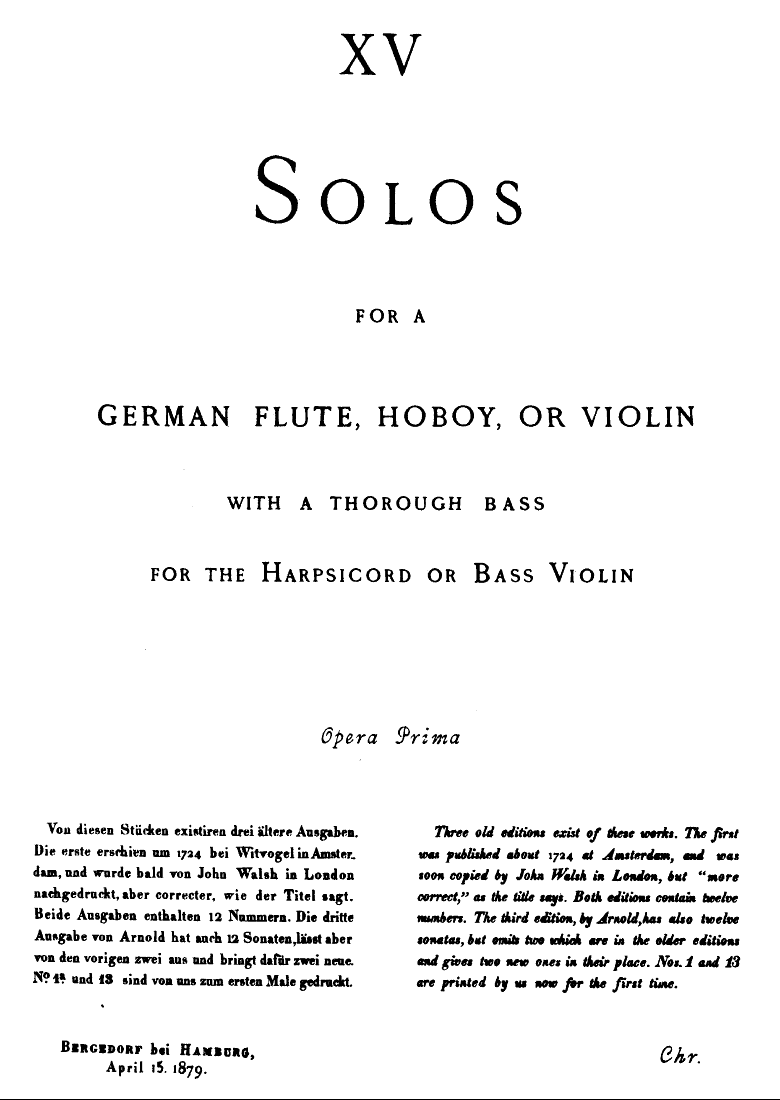
Forward.

- List of solo sonatas by George Frideric Handel
- Publications by Friedrich Chrysander
- Handel solo sonatas (publication by Walsh)
- Handel flute sonatas
