= Recorder sonata in C major (HWV 365) =

Composition by George Frideric Handel

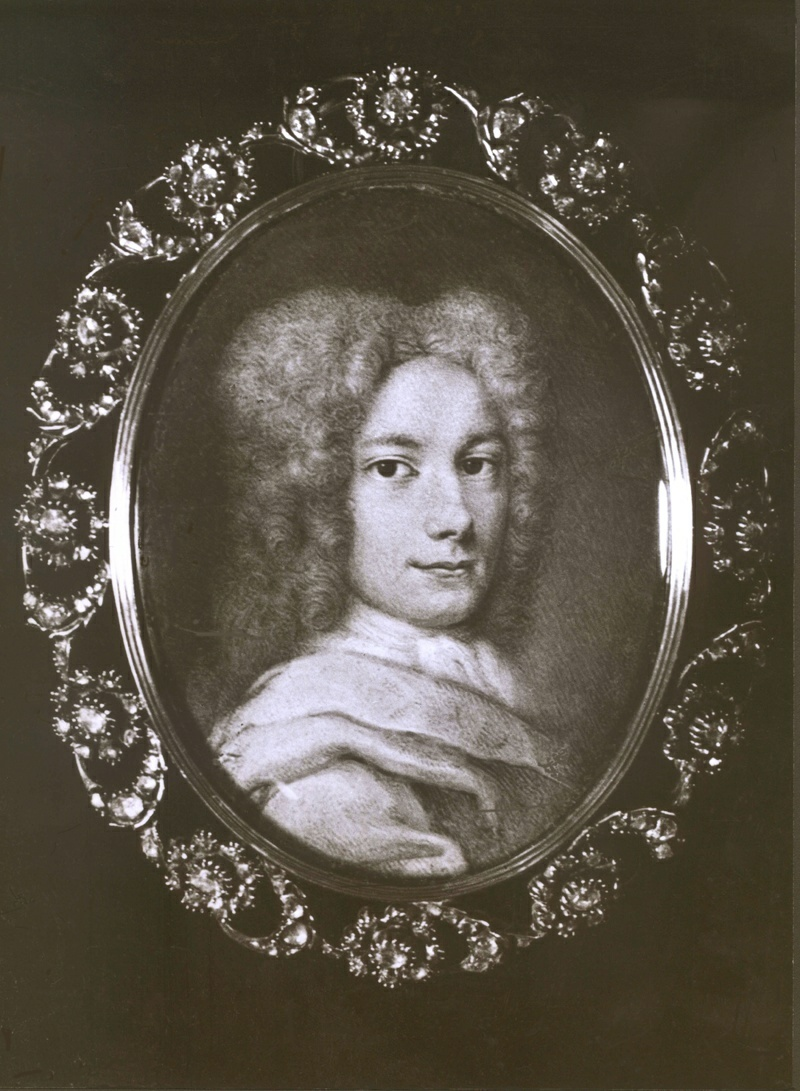
George Frideric Handel c. 1710

The Recorder sonata in C major (HWV 365), for recorder and basso continuo, was composed (probably before 1712) by George Frideric Handel. The work is also referred to as Opus 1 No. 7, and was first published in or shortly after 1726—in a collection of twelve sonatas titled Sonates pour un Traversiere un Violon ou Hautbois Con Basso Continuo Composées par G. F. Handel—purportedly in Amsterdam by Jeanne Roger, but now shown to have been a forgery by the London publisher John Walsh. Walsh republished this sonata in 1731 or 1732 under his own imprint in a similar collection, containing ten of the earlier sonatas and two new ones, with the new title Solos for a German Flute a Hoboy or Violin With a Thorough Bass for the Harpsichord or Bass Violin Compos'd by Mr. Handel. Other catalogues of Handel's music have referred to the work as HG xxvii, 15; and HHA iv/3,33.

The pseudo-Roger, Walsh, and the Chrysander (based upon pseudo-Roger and Walsh) editions indicate that the work is for recorder ("flauto"), and published it as Sonata VII, though the autograph manuscript is missing the title page. This autograph is a fair copy made most likely in 1712, but a reliable copyist's manuscript gives the instrumentation in Italian: flauto e cembalo, exactly as in Handel's complete autographs of the Sonatas in G minor, A minor, and F major.

== Movements ==
The work consists of five movements:

	Tempo	Key	Meter	Bars	Notes
I	Larghetto	C major	4/4	24	Concludes with a one-bar adagio in G major.
II	Allegro	C major	3/8	132	
III	Larghetto	A minor	3/4	43	Concludes with an E major chord.
IV	A tempo di Gavotti	C major	4/4	46	Three sections (4, 8 and 34 bars)—each with repeat markings. Cut-common time signature.
V	Allegro	C major	3/8	64	Two sections (16 and 48 bars)—each with repeat markings.

(Movements do not contain repeat markings unless indicated. The number of bars is taken from the Chrysander edition, and is the raw number in the manuscript—not including repeat markings.)

Three of these movements are related to other works by Handel:

- Handel also used the second movement in the overture to the opera Scipione (1726)
- The third movement is a revised version of the third movement of the Oboe Sonata in F Major (1711–16)
- The fifth movement is related to the duet "Placa l'alma", from act 1, scene 4 of the opera Alessandro, (1725–26)

== See also ==
- List of solo sonatas by George Frideric Handel
- XV Handel solo sonatas (publication by Chrysander)
- Handel solo sonatas (publication by Walsh)
