= Flute sonata in E minor (HWV 375) =

Composition by George Frideric Handel

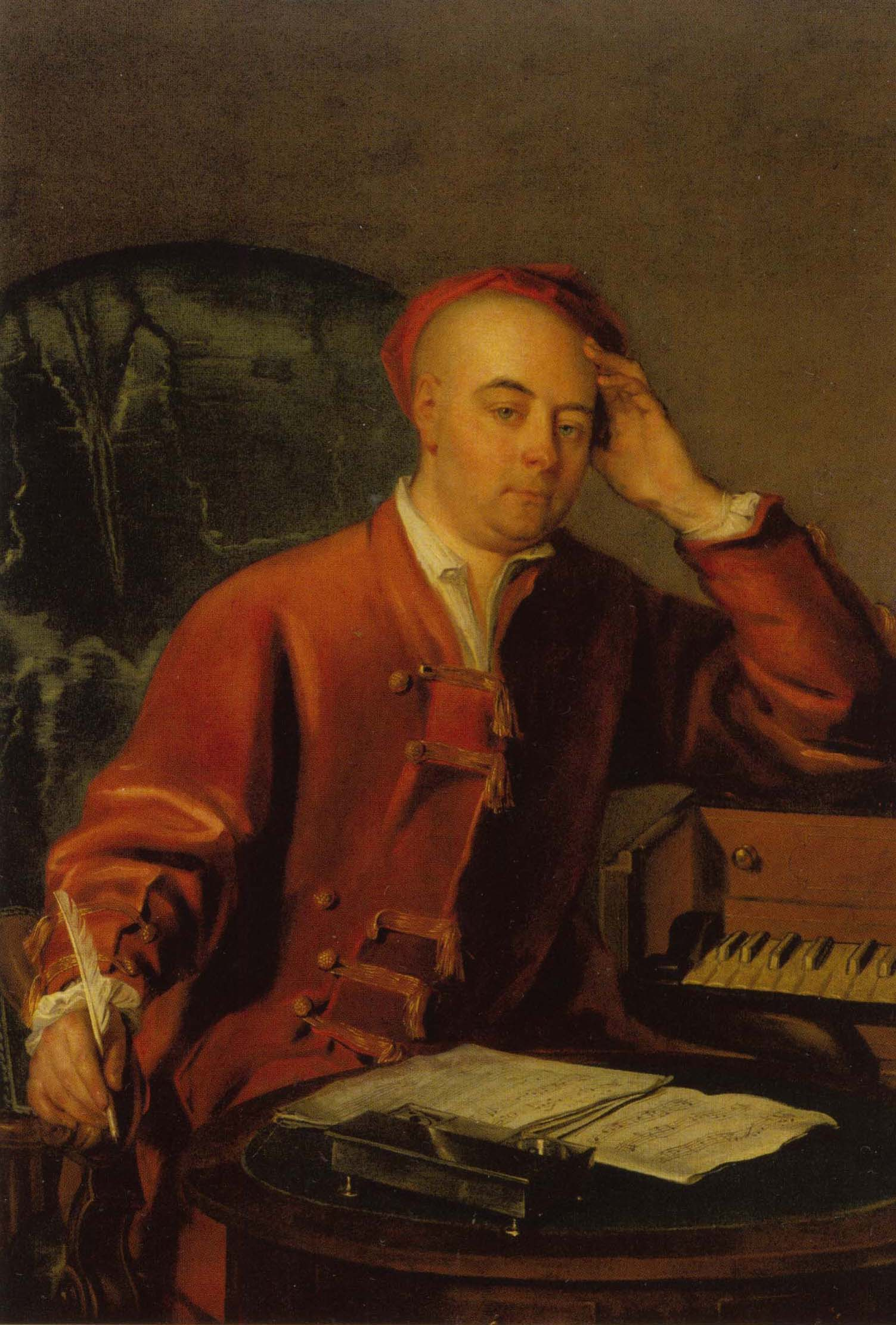
George Frideric Handel, by Philippe Mercier, c.1730

The Flute sonata in E minor (HWV 375) is thought to have been composed by George Frideric Handel, for flute and basso continuo. The date of composition of the work is unknown, but it was first published in 1730. Other catalogues of Handel's music have referred to the work as HG xlviii, 134; and HHA iv/3,63.

The authenticity of the sonata as such is uncertain, though three of the movements were certainly composed by Handel but for other instruments. It is referred to as "Halle Sonata No. 2" (in German "Hallenser Sonate Nr. 2"), following Chrysander's assumption that it was an early work, composed during Handel's boyhood in Halle, before 1703. This cannot be true for this particular sonata, however, because the first two movements are a transposition into E minor of the corresponding movements of the final version of the much-revised Sonata for oboe in C minor, HWV 366, which dates from 1711–12.

The fourth movement, also, was originally a minuet in G minor for harpsichord, later printed in 1733, while the third movement is a Grave whose attribution to Handel is very doubtful. The Chrysander edition indicates that the work is for flute ("Traversa"), and published it as Sonata XVII.

A typical performance of the work takes almost seven minutes.

== Movements ==
The work consists of four movements:

	Tempo	Key	Meter	Bars	Notes
I	Adagio	E minor	4/4	18	Ends on a B major chord. Taken from the oboe sonata in C minor (HWV 366). Contains dipping lines and artful modulations.
II	Allegro	E minor	4/4	45	Taken from the oboe sonata in C minor (HWV 366). The main theme, initially treated with strict canonic imitation in the continuo, is chromatic and full of awkward intervals. Contains semiquaver passagework.
III	Grave	E minor	3/4	27	A brief movement containing a broad sweeping elaboration of the melodic line.
IV	Minuet	E minor	3/4	36	Two sections (16 and 20 bars)—each with repeat markings. Also used as the fourth movement of the keyboard suite HWV 434. Has strong echoes (especially in the bass) in the minuet of the G major section of the Water Music.

(Movements do not contain repeat markings unless indicated. The number of bars is taken from the Chrysander edition, and is the raw number in the manuscript—not including repeat markings.)

== See also ==
- Handel flute sonatas
- List of solo sonatas by George Frideric Handel
- XV Handel solo sonatas (publication by Chrysander)
