= Handel solo sonatas (Walsh) =

Set of sonatas published in 1732

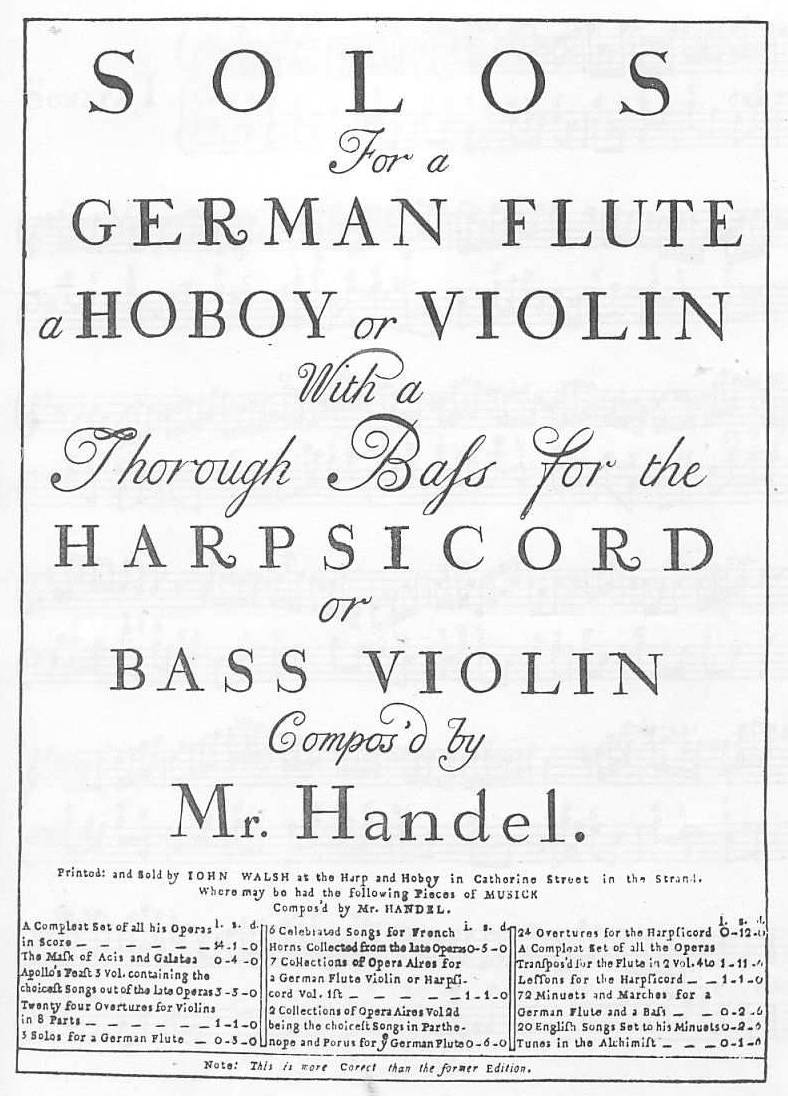
Cover of Walsh's 1732 publication.

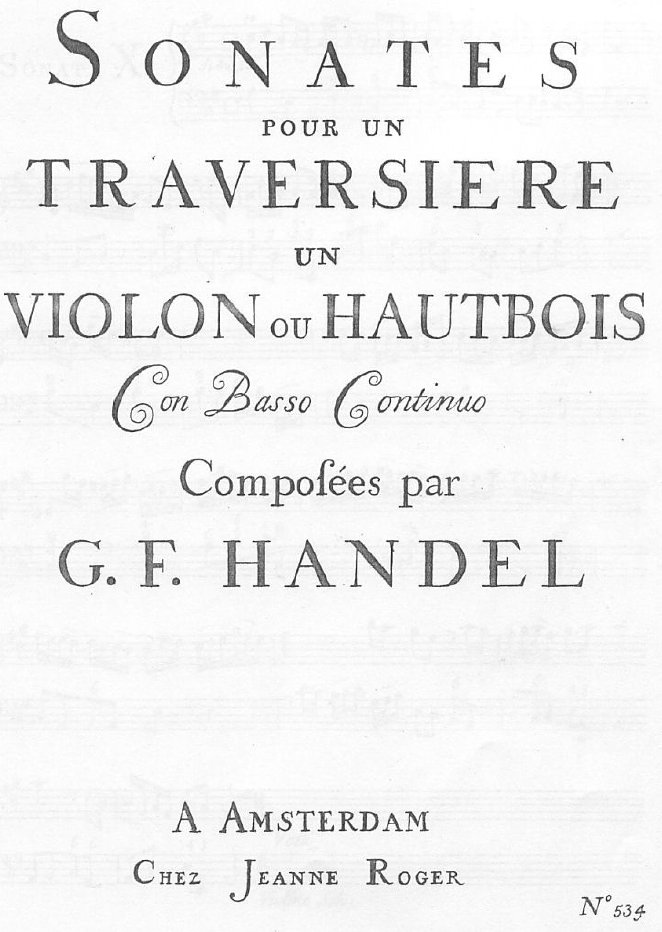
Cover of "Roger's" 1730 publication.

Solos for a German Flute a Hoboy or Violin with a Thorough Bass for the Harpsichord or Bass Violin Compos'd by Mr. Handel was published by John Walsh in 1732. It contains a set of twelve sonatas, for various instruments, composed by George Frideric Handel. The 63 page publication includes the sonatas that are generally known as Handel's Opus 1 (three extra "Opus 1" sonatas were added in a later edition by Chrysander).

== Reprinted material from a 1730 forgery ==
The 1732 edition (which displays at the bottom of the title page the legend "Note: This is more Corect [sic] than the former Edition") was mostly reprinted from the plates of an earlier 1730 publication, titled Sonates pour un Traversiere un Violon ou Hautbois Con Basso Continuo Composées par G. F. Handel—purportedly printed in Amsterdam by Jeanne Roger, but now shown to have been a forgery by Walsh (dated well after Jeanne Roger's death in 1722). There was also a third edition of a later, uncertain date, which bears the plate no. 407.

== Publication style ==
Each sonata displays the melody and bass lines—with the expectation that a competent keyboard player would supply the omitted inner parts based on the figured bass markings. By modern-day standards, the music in the publication has a primitive appearance—with squashed notes and irregular spacings, stems and bar widths—as can be seen in the image of page 1 (reproduced below in this article).

== Flauto recorder sonatas ==
Despite the titles in both editions, four of the sonatas in each are for a fourth instrument: the flauto (recorder).

== Summary ==
The following table lists each of the sonatas included by Walsh in his publication of 1732, as well as information about the instrument, the key, and the original sonata by Handel.

Sonata	Instrument	Key signature	Handel's sonata
Sonata I	Flute	E minor	Flute sonata in E minor (HWV 359b). This is the same sonata as Chrysander's Sonata I^{b}.
Sonata II	Recorder	G minor	Recorder sonata in G minor (HWV 360).
Sonata III	Violin	A major	Violin sonata in A major (HWV 361).
Sonata IV	Recorder	A minor	Recorder sonata in A minor (HWV 362).
Sonata V	Flute	G major	Flute sonata in G major (HWV 363b).
Sonata VI	Oboe	G minor	Violin sonata in G minor (HWV 364a).
Sonata VII	Recorder	C major	Recorder sonata in C major (HWV 365).
Sonata VIII	Oboe	C minor	Oboe sonata in C minor (HWV 366).
Sonata IX	Flute	B minor	Flute sonata in B minor (HWV 367b). Walsh published what is now considered to be Handel's Opus 1 No. 9b. (Handel's Opus 1 No. 9a is the Recorder sonata in D minor (HWV 367a).)
Sonata X	Violin	G minor	Violin sonata in G minor (HWV 368). Probably spurious.
Sonata XI	Recorder	F major	Recorder sonata in F major (HWV 369).
Sonata XII	Violin	F major	Violin sonata in F major (HWV 370). Probably spurious.

The following table lists the sonatas included by Walsh in his publication of 1730. Sonatas I – IX and XI were as per the 1732 publication (defined above).

Sonata	Instrument	Key signature	Handel's sonata
Sonata X	Violin	A major	Violin sonata in A major (HWV 372). Probably spurious. Designated Opus 1, No. 14 by the later Chrysander edition.
Sonata XII	Violin	E major	Violin sonata in E major (HWV 373). Probably spurious. Designated Opus 1, No. 15 by the later Chrysander edition.

Page 1 of Walsh's 1732 publication.

== See also ==
- List of solo sonatas by George Frideric Handel
- XV Handel solo sonatas (publication by Chrysander)
- Handel flute sonatas

== Bibliography ==
- Best, Terence. 1985. "Handel's Chamber Music: Sources, Chronology and Authenticity", Early Music 13, no. 4 (November): 476–99.
- Hunter, David. 2002. "George Frideric Handel as Victim: Composer-Publisher Relations and the Discourse of Musicology". In Encomium Musicae: Essays in Memory of Robert J. Snow, edited by David E. Crawford and George Grayson Wagstaff, 663–92. Festschrift series, No. 17. Hillsdale: Pendragon Press. ISBN 0-945193-83-1.
- Hicks, Anthony. 2001. "Handel, George Frideric". The New Grove Dictionary of Music and Musicians, second edition, edited by Stanley Sadie and John Tyrrell. London: Macmillan Publishers.
- Kidson, Frank, William C. Smith, Peter Ward Jones, and David Hunter. 2001a. "Walsh, John (i)". The New Grove Dictionary of Music and Musicians, second edition, edited by Stanley Sadie and John Tyrrell. London: Macmillan Publishers.
- Kidson, Frank, William C. Smith, Peter Ward Jones, and David Hunter. 2001b. "Walsh, John (ii)". The New Grove Dictionary of Music and Musicians, second edition, edited by Stanley Sadie and John Tyrrell. London: Macmillan Publishers.
- Smith, William Charles, and Charles Humphries. 1968. A Bibliography of the Musical Works Published by the Firm of John Walsh During the Years 1721–1766. London: Bibliographical Society.
