= Flute sonata in A minor (HWV 374) =

Composition attributed to G F Handel

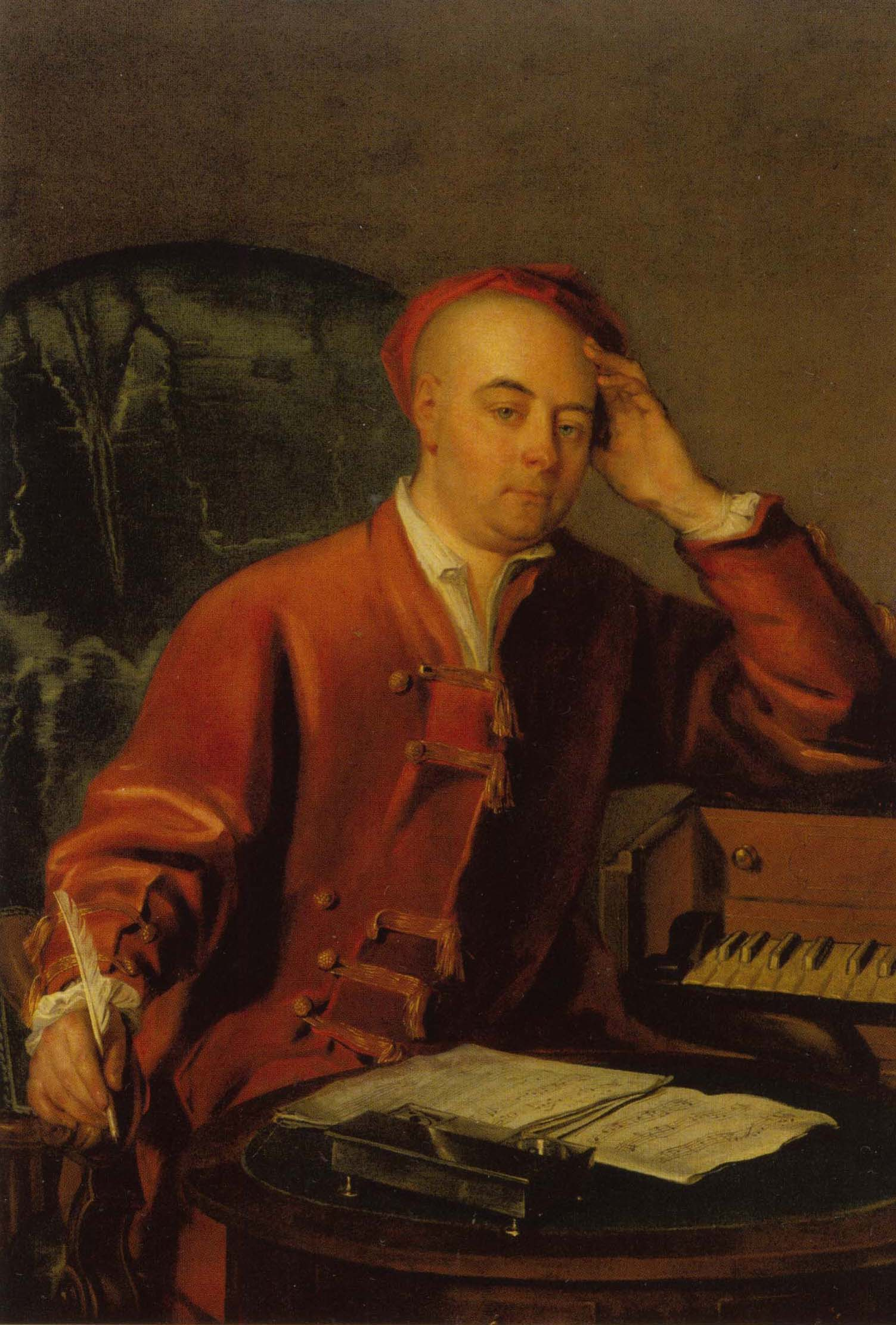
George Frideric Handel, by Philippe Mercier, c.1730

The Flute sonata in A minor (HWV 374) is thought to have been composed by George Frideric Handel, for flute and basso continuo. The date of composition of the work is unknown, but it was first published in 1730. Other catalogues of Handel's music have referred to the work as HG xlviii, 130; and HHA iv/3,57.

The authenticity of the sonata is uncertain, however the work is written in a style that is characteristically Handelian. It is referred to as "Halle Sonata No. 1", and is sometimes called "Hallenser Sonaten" (following Chrysander's assumption that it was an early work). The Chrysander edition indicates that the work is for flute ("Traversa"), and published it as Sonata XVI.

A typical performance of the work takes about eleven and a half minutes.

== Movements ==
The work consists of four movements:

	Tempo	Key	Meter	Bars	Notes
I	Adagio	A minor	3/4	44	Begins with a bold line with falling sevenths and passes into the bass with persistent rhythms.
II	Allegro	A minor	4/4	34	Two sections (15 and 19 bars)—each with repeat markings. The continuo constantly pursues the flute. The ending of the first section and the beginning of the second section are in E major.
III	Adagio	A minor	4/4	25	Two sections (12 and 12 bars)—each with repeat markings. The first section has a different second-time final bar. Contains a resourceful bass line.
IV	Allegro	A minor	3/4	47	Two sections (23 and 24 bars)—each with repeat markings. Particularly Handelian with its striking rhythms, leaping line, and a repeated note figure used by Handel a great deal at expressive climaxes in his operas. The ending of the first section and the beginning of the second section are in E major.

(Movements do not contain repeat markings unless indicated. The number of bars is taken from the Chrysander edition, and is the raw number in the manuscript—not including repeat markings.)

== See also ==
- Handel flute sonatas
- List of solo sonatas by George Frideric Handel
- XV Handel solo sonatas (publication by Chrysander)
