= Recorder sonata in G minor (HWV 360) =

Musical composition by G. F. Handel

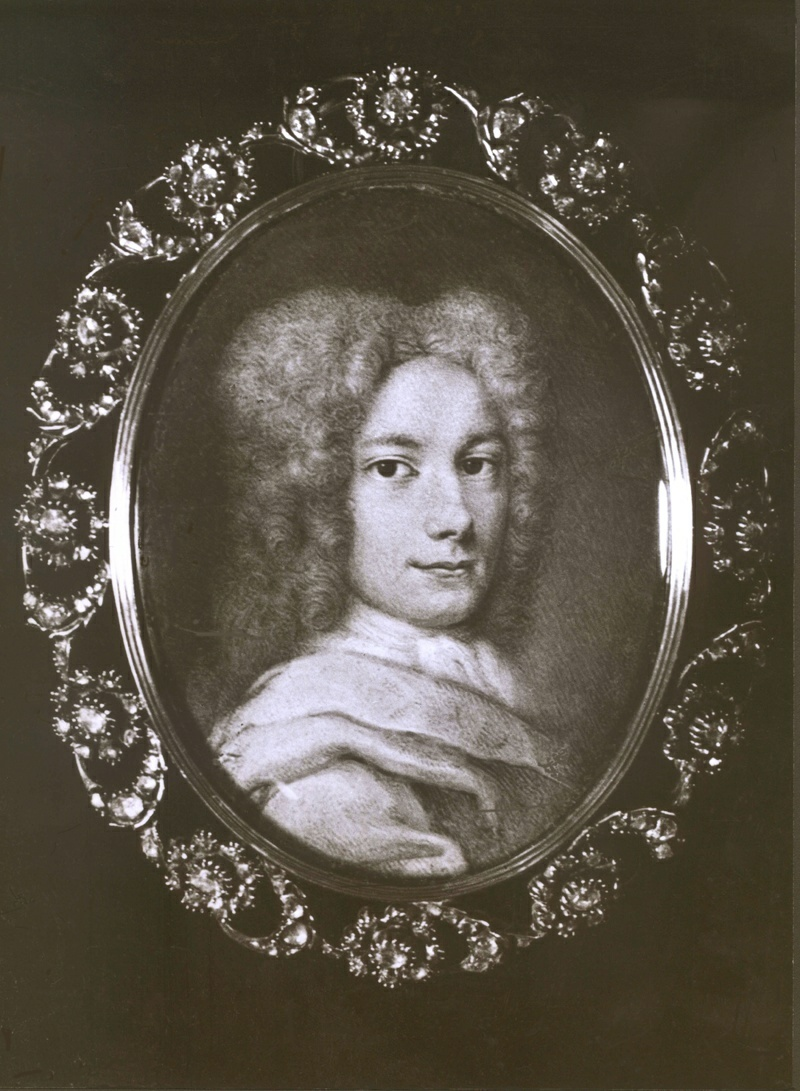
George Frideric Handel c. 1710

The Recorder sonata in G minor (HWV 360) was composed by George Frideric Handel for recorder and basso continuo (the autograph manuscript, a fair copy made most likely in 1712, gives this instrumentation in Italian: "flauto e cembalo"). The work is also referred to as Opus 1 No. 2, and was first published in 1732 by Walsh. Other catalogues of Handel's music have referred to the work as HG xxvii,9; and HHA iv/3,16.

Both the Walsh edition and the Chrysander edition indicate that the work is for recorder ("flauto"), and published it as Sonata II.

A typical performance of the work takes almost 9 minutes.

== Movements ==
The work consists of four movements:

	Tempo	Key	Meter	Bars	Notes
I	Larghetto	G minor	4/4	20	Concludes with a brief adagio and a D major chord.
II	Andante	G minor	3/4	60	Two sections (30 and 30 bars)—each with repeat markings. In the style of Corelli
III	Adagio	E♭ major	3/2	12	Concludes with a D major chord.
IV	Presto	G minor	4/4	33	Two sections (13 and 20 bars)—each with repeat markings.

(Movements do not contain repeat markings unless indicated. The number of bars is taken from the Chrysander edition, and is the raw number in the manuscript—not including repeat markings.)

== See also ==
- List of solo sonatas by George Frideric Handel
- XV Handel solo sonatas (publication by Chrysander)
- Handel solo sonatas (publication by Walsh)
