= Violin Sonata No. 9 (Ries) =

1810 sonata by Ferdinand Ries

Ferdinand Ries's Violin Sonata No. 9 in E♭ major, Op. 18, was published in 1810 by Simrock with a dedication to a "Mademoiselle Maria Held". As with all of the composers published violin sonatas the work is for piano with violin accompaniment.

== Structure ==
The sonata is in three movements:

1. Allegro
2. Andantino (Note: Cecil Hill noted in his thematic catalog of Ferdiand Ries's compositions that the crossed out second (Andantino) movement of Riese's, unpublished 1804 violin sonata had a note stating that it had been transferred to this work, however this does not appear to have been the case in the published work, and Hill was unable to identify where the movement had been reused.)
3. Allegretto moderato

Typical performances should take around 30 minutes.
