= Recorder sonata in A minor (HWV 362) =

Musical composition by G. F. Handel

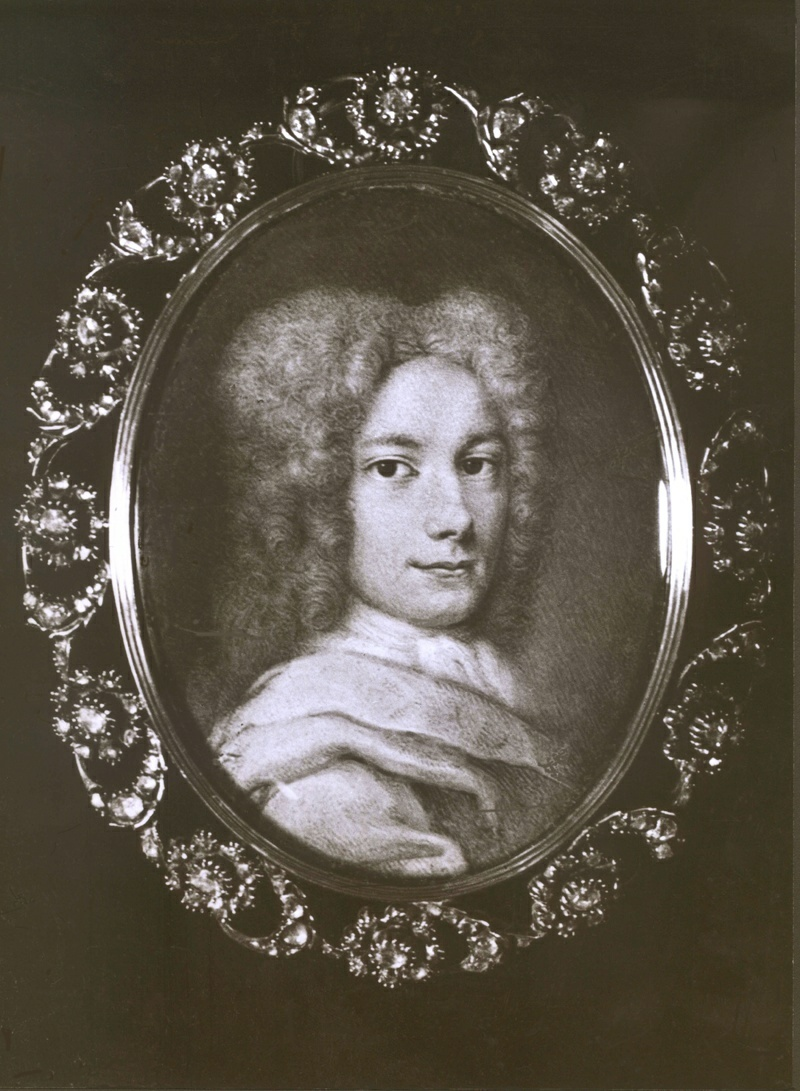
George Frideric Handel c. 1710

The Recorder sonata in A minor (HWV 362) was composed (c. 1712) by George Frideric Handel for recorder and basso continuo (the autograph manuscript, a fair copy made most likely in 1712, gives this instrumentation in Italian: "flauto e cembalo"). The work is also referred to as Opus 1 No. 4, and was first published in 1732 by Walsh. Other catalogues of Handel's music have referred to the work as HG xxvii, 15; and HHA iv/3,21.

Both the Walsh edition and the Chrysander edition indicate that the work is for recorder ("flauto"), and published it as Sonata IV.

A typical performance of the work takes about 11 minutes.

== Movements ==
The work consists of four movements:

	Tempo	Key	Meter	Bars	Notes
I	Larghetto	A minor	3/4	50	Concludes with a E major chord.
II	Allegro	A minor	4/4	38	Two sections (19 and 19 bars)—each with repeat markings.
III	Adagio	?	4/4	17	Even though there are no sharps or flats in the key signature, the movement begins in F major. Concludes with an E major chord.
IV	Allegro	A minor	4/4	50	Two sections (24 and 26 bars)—each with repeat markings. A transposed version of HWV 408.

(Movements do not contain repeat markings unless indicated. The number of bars is taken from the Chrysander edition, and is the raw number in the manuscript—not including repeat markings.)

== See also ==
- List of solo sonatas by George Frideric Handel
- XV Handel solo sonatas (publication by Chrysander)
- Handel solo sonatas (publication by Walsh)
