= Recorder sonata in F major (HWV 369) =

Musical composition by G. F. Handel

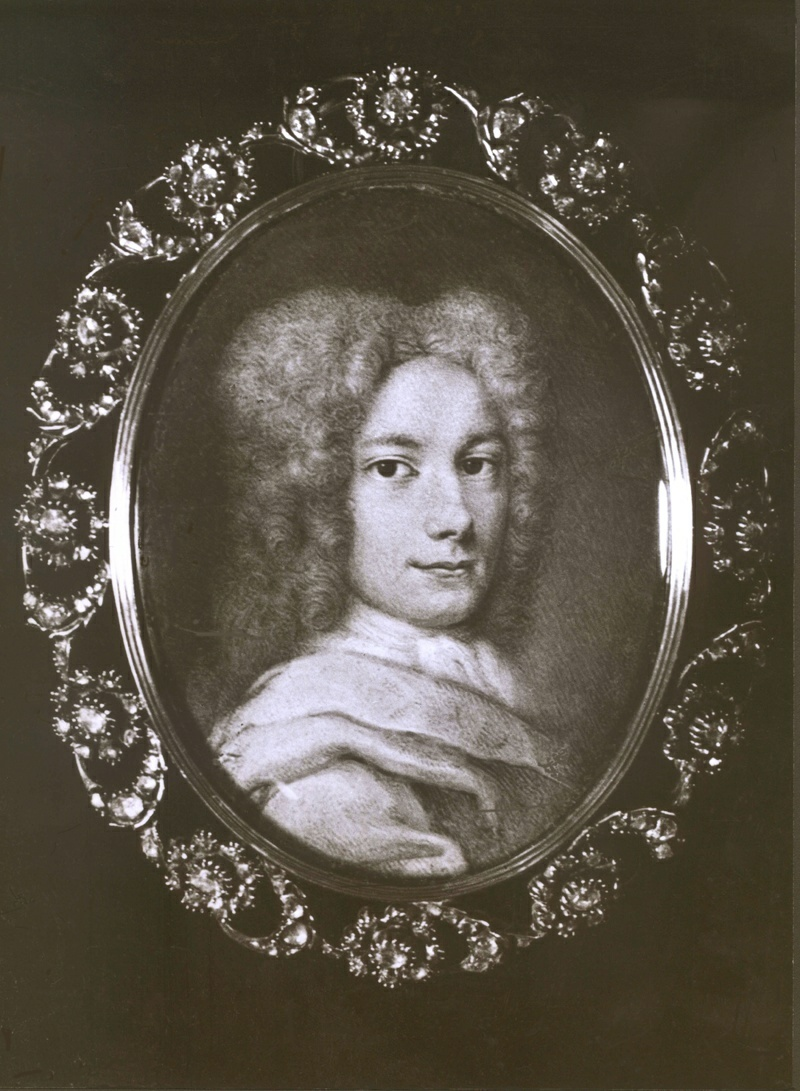
Handel c. 1710

The Sonata in F major (HWV 369) was composed (before 1712) by George Frideric Handel for recorder and basso continuo (the autograph manuscript, a fair copy made most likely in 1712, gives this instrumentation in Italian: "flauto e cembalo"). The work is also referred to as Opus 1 No. 11, and was first published in 1732 by Walsh. Other catalogues of Handel's music have referred to the work as HG xxvii, 40; and HHA iv/3,52.

Handel used an arrangement of the sonata in his Organ Concerto in F major (HWV 293).

Both the Walsh edition and the Chrysander edition indicate that the work is for recorder ("flauto"), and published it as Sonata XI.

The theme plays during the opening titles of Ingmar Bergman's 1978 film Autumn Sonata.

== Movements ==
The work consists of four movements:

	Tempo	Key	Meter	Bars	Notes
I	Larghetto	F major	3/4	44	Concludes with a half cadence on a dominant (C major) chord.
II	Allegro	F major	4/4	28	Two sections (14 and 14 bars)—each with repeat markings. First section concludes with an authentic cadence on a C major chord. Second section begins in C major.
III	Siciliana		12/8	11	Begins in D minor. Concludes with a Phrygian half cadence on a dominant (A major) chord.
IV	Allegro	F major	12/8	28	Two sections (8 and 20 bars)—each with repeat markings.

(Movements do not contain repeat markings unless indicated. The number of bars is taken from the Chrysander edition, and is the raw number in the manuscript—not including repeat markings.)

== See also ==
- List of solo sonatas by George Frideric Handel
- XV Handel solo sonatas (publication by Chrysander)
- Handel solo sonatas (publication by Walsh)
