= Susan Trew =

English composer (1853–?)

Susan Codd Trew (born 1853) was an English composer, pianist, and teacher who is best remembered today for her Sonata for Violin and Piano.

Trew studied at the London Academy of Music, where she was awarded a gold medal. She married organist and composer Charles Abraham Trew in 1880. In 1882 they had a son, Arthur Charles Trew, who also became a composer.

Trew's music was published by E. Ashdown, Boosey & Co., Landy & Co., and Schott Music. Some of it is available at the British Library. Her works include:

== Violin and piano ==
- Allegretto Grazioso
- Barcarolle
- Bluette
- Cavatina
- Lullaby
- Melody
- Romance
- Sonata
- Two Morceaux Faciles
- Valse Mignonne

== Voice ==
- "Shadow Town" (text by L.D. Rice)
