= Violin sonata in F major (HWV 370) =

Music attributed to G. F. Handel

The Violin sonata in F major (HWV 370) is a work for violin and basso continuo that was originally thought to have been composed by George Frideric Handel. Modern scholars however believe it doubtful that the work was composed by Handel, and have labelled it as "spurious". The work is also referred to as Opus 1 No. 12, and was first published in 1732 by Walsh. Other catalogues of Handel's music have referred to the work as HG xxvii,42; and HHA iv/4,40.

Both the Walsh edition and the Chrysander edition indicate that the work is for violin, and published it as Sonata XII.

== Movements ==
The work consists of four movements:

	Tempo	Key	Meter	Bars	Notes
I	Adagio	F major	3/4	54	
II	Allegro	F major	4/4	44	Two sections (8 and 36 bars)—each with repeat markings.
III	Largo	D minor	3/2	22	Two sections (8 and 14 bars)—each with repeat markings.
IV	Allegro	F major	4/4	52	Two sections (20 and 32 bars)—each with repeat markings. First section concludes, and second section begins in C major.

(Movements do not contain repeat markings unless indicated. The number of bars is taken from the Chrysander edition, and is the raw number in the manuscript—not including repeat markings.)

== See also ==
- List of solo sonatas by George Frideric Handel
- XV Handel solo sonatas (publication by Chrysander)
- Handel solo sonatas (publication by Walsh)
