= Violin sonata in G minor (HWV 364a) =

Musical composition by G. F. Handel

Portrait of George Frideric Handel by Balthasar Denner, c. 1726–28

The Violin sonata in G minor (HWV 364a) was composed (c. 1722–24) by George Frideric Handel for violin and basso continuo. The work is also referred to as Opus 1 No. 6, and was first published in 1732 by Walsh. Other catalogues of Handel's music have referred to the work as HG xxvii,22; and HHA iv/18,6. Also published in HG xlviii,118 (with an extra part for Organo).

Both the Walsh edition and the Chrysander edition indicate that the work is for oboe, and published it as Sonata VI. It is not known whether Handel sanctioned the change of instrument, however the fact that the piece contains notes beyond the range of the oboe would suggest that he did not. Handel's original manuscript indicates that the sonata would be suitable "per la Viola da Gamba"—and the version of the work for that instrument is designated as HWV 364b.

A typical performance of the work takes just over seven minutes.

== Movements ==
The work consists of four movements:

	Tempo	Key	Meter	Bars	Notes
I	Larghetto	G minor	4/4	17	Concludes with a brief adagio and a D major chord.
II	Allegro	G minor	4/4	45	
III	Adagio	E♭ major	3/4	11	Concludes with a D major chord.
IV	Allegro	G minor	12/8	30	Two sections (10 and 20 bars)—each with repeat markings. Begins in G minor, but quickly adds flecks of colour from other keys.

(Movements do not contain repeat markings unless indicated. The number of bars is taken from the Chrysander edition, and is the raw number in the manuscript—not including repeat markings.)

== See also ==
- List of solo sonatas by George Frideric Handel
- XV Handel solo sonatas (publication by Chrysander)
- Handel solo sonatas (publication by Walsh)
