= Violin Sonata in E-flat major (Ries) =

1804 sonata by Ferdinand Ries

Ferdinand Ries composed his Violin Sonata in E♭ major, WoO. 7 (Note: The manuscript title is "Grande Sonata pour le Piano-Forte avec un Violon oblige") in 1804, when he was 22 years old. Surviving in manuscript form in the Berlin State Library, there is no evidence the work was performed during the composer's lifetime and was amongst a number of compositions that remained unpublished at the composers death.

== Structure ==
The sonata is structured in five movements, one of which is crossed out in the manuscript:

1. Allegro con brio
2. Andantino (Note: Cecil Hill reports that this movement exists only as a crossed out violin part. The accompanying note claims that the movement was included in the composers violin sonata, Op. 18, however Hill states that this is not the case, nor is it in any of the composers other sonatas.)
3. Allegro molto
4. Adagio molto expressivo
5. Allegro molto vivace
