= Violin Sonata No. 10 (Ries) =

1810 sonata by Ferdinand Ries

Ferdinand Ries's Violin Sonata No. 10 in F minor, Op. 19, was published in 1810 by Simrock with a dedication to two friends, Franz Christian Kirchhoffer and composer Ludwig Wilhelm Maurer. As with all of the composers published violin sonatas the work is, like many of the composers flute sonatas, for piano with the second instrument, in this case the violin providing accompaniment.

== Structure ==
The sonata is in three movements:

1. Largo espressivo – Allegro agitato
2. Andante
3. Rondo: Allegro

Typical performances take around 30 minutes.

In the notes to the Naxos recording, Susan Kagan, draws comparisons between this composition and Beethoven's Appassionata Sonata, which had been published about three years earlier, claiming that the two works share a similar mood. Phillip Buttall in his review of the recording agreed with this assessment adding that the introduction to the first movement appears to have been inspired by the opening of the Pathetique Sonata. Ralph Graves, in his review of the album, disagreed with both Kagan and Buttall, noting that the work is much more restrained than either of the Beethoven sonatas, perhaps due to the fact that the composer was writing for French audiences and publication for amateur performers rather than the concert hall. He also regarded the sonata as the most effective of the three recorded, perhaps because by that time the composer had more experience in the composition of this type of work compared with the two Op. 8 sonatas on the album.
