= Violin sonata in A major (HWV 361) =

Sonata by George Frideric Handel

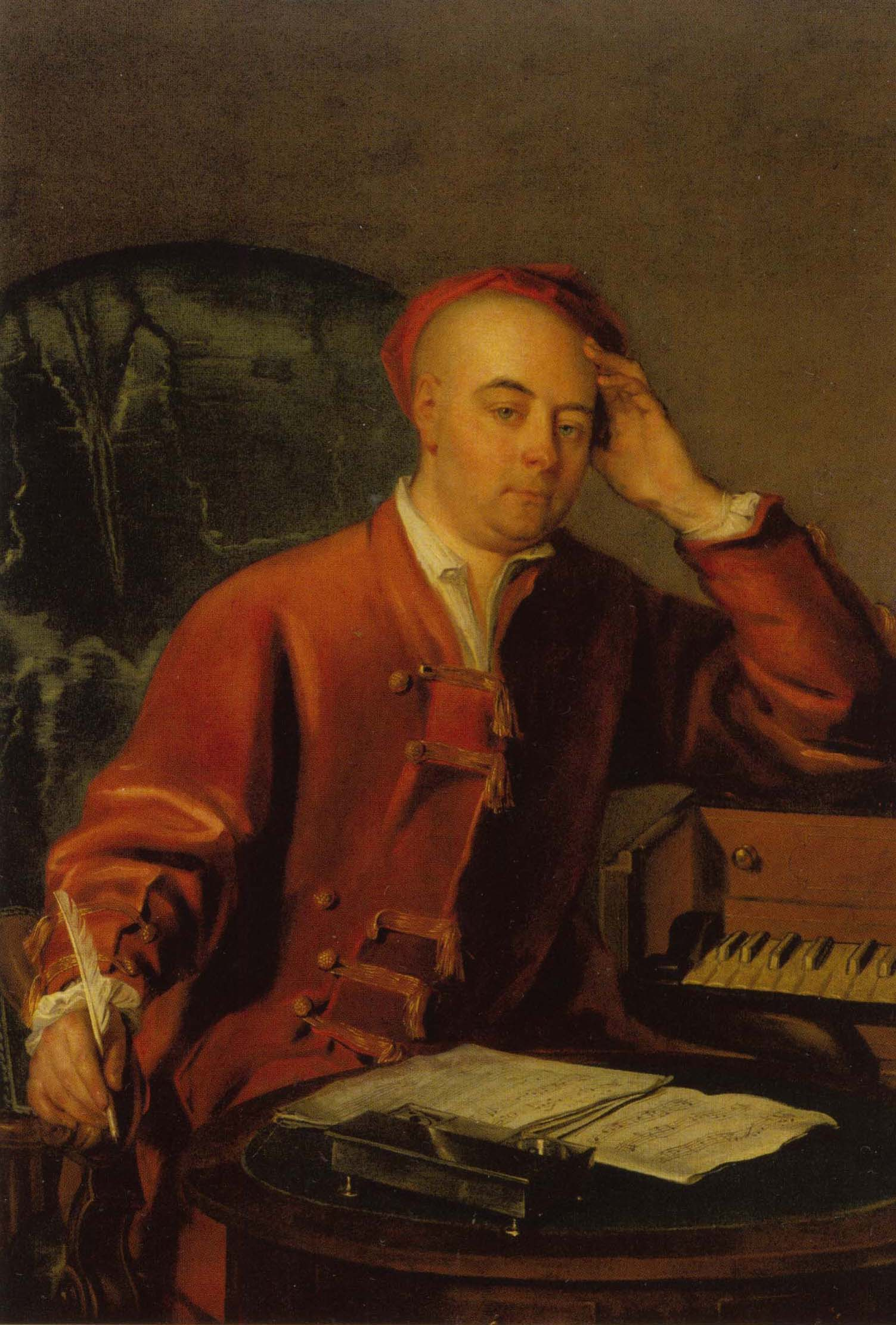
George Frideric Handel, by Philippe Mercier, c.1730

The Violin sonata in A major (HWV 361) was composed (c. 1725–26) by George Frideric Handel for violin and basso continuo. The work is also referred to as Opus 1 No. 3, and was first published in 1732 by Walsh. Other catalogues of Handel's music have referred to the work as HG xxvii,12; and HHA iv/4,2.

Both the Walsh edition and the Chrysander edition indicate that the work is for violin, and published it as Sonata III.

== Movements ==
The work consists of four movements:

	Tempo	Key	Meter	Bars	Notes
I	Andante	A major	4/4	22	Concludes with a brief adagio and an E major chord.
II	Allegro	A major	4/4	52	Concludes with an A major chord on a perfect cadence.
III	Adagio	F♯ minor	4/4	5	
IV	Allegro	A major	12/8	36	Two sections (16 and 20 bars)—each with repeat markings. Second section starts in E major.

(Movements do not contain repeat markings unless indicated. The number of bars is taken from the Chrysander edition, and is the raw number in the manuscript—not including repeat markings.)

== See also ==
- List of solo sonatas by George Frideric Handel
- XV Handel solo sonatas (publication by Chrysander)
- Handel solo sonatas (publication by Walsh)
