= Violin Sonata No. 8 (Beethoven) =

Violin Sonata
- No. 8
- by Ludwig van Beethoven
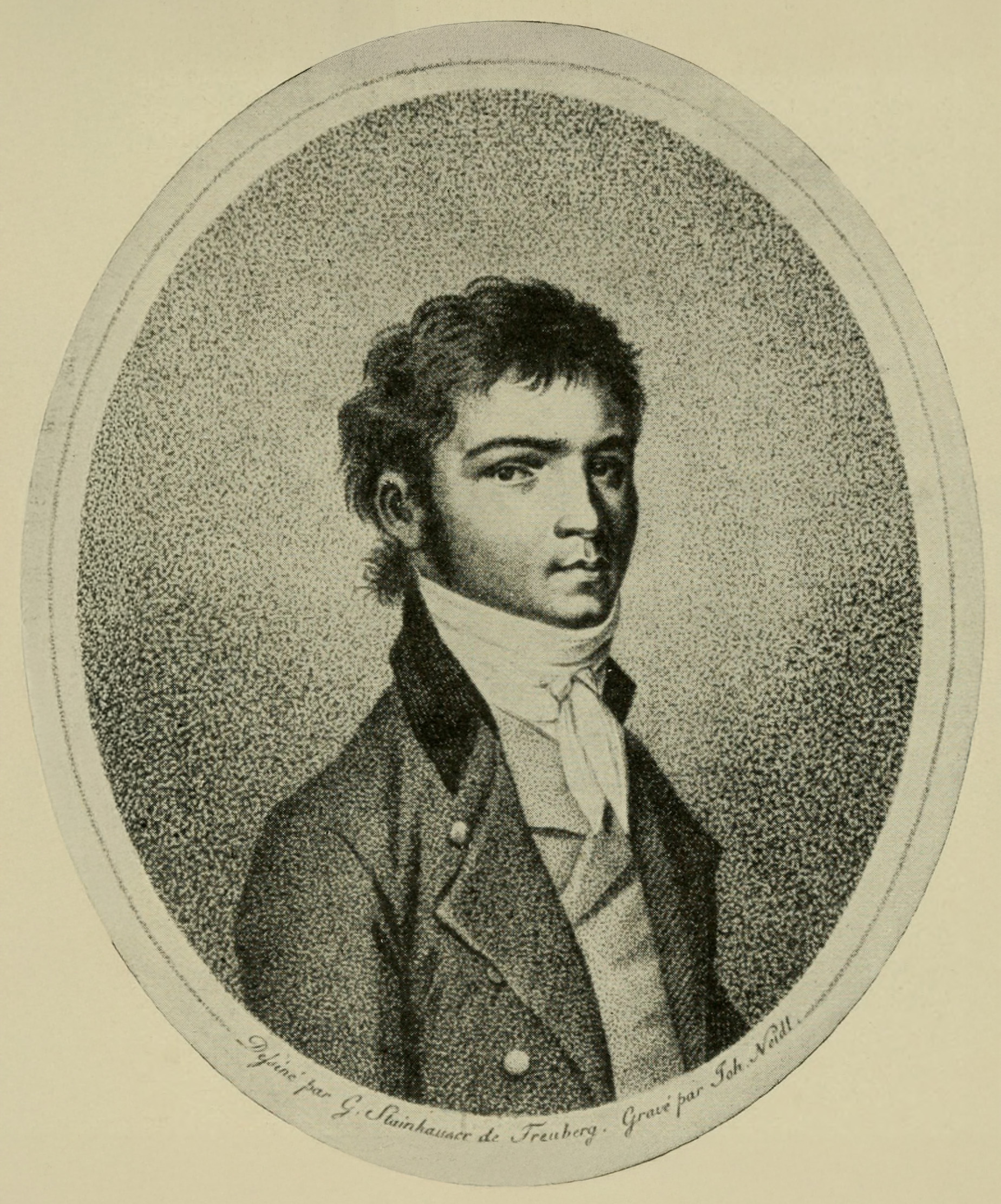
- 1801 engraving by Johann Joseph Neidl, after a now-lost portrait of Beethoven by Gandolph Ernst Stainhauser von Treuberg, ca. 1800
- Key: G major
- Opus: 30
- Composed: 1801–02
- Dedication: Alexander I of Russia
- Published: May 1803
- Duration: 18 minutes
- Movements: 3

The Violin Sonata No. 8 in G major, Op. 30, No. 3, by Ludwig van Beethoven, the third of his Opus 30 set, was written between 1801 and 1802, published in May 1803, and dedicated to Tsar Alexander I of Russia. In response, Alexander gave Beethoven a diamond when they met at the Congress of Vienna, in 1814.

== Structure ==
I. Allegro assai

II. Tempo di minuetto, ma molto moderato e grazioso

III. Allegro vivace
Performed by Paul Rosenthal (violin) and Edward Auer (piano)

The sonata has three movements:

1. Allegro assai
2. Tempo di minuetto, ma molto moderato e grazioso, in E♭ major
3. Allegro vivace

This sonata is characteristic of early/middle Beethoven in its solid sonata structure, just beginning to get adventurous in syncopation, with some extraordinary off beat sforzandi.

The work takes approximately 18 minutes to perform.

== Notable recordings ==
Famous recordings of the sonata include one by Fritz Kreisler with Sergei Rachmaninoff at the piano.
