= Violin sonata in G minor (HWV 368) =

The Violin sonata in G minor (HWV 368) is a work for violin and basso continuo that was originally thought to have been composed by George Frideric Handel. Modern scholars however believe it doubtful that the work was composed by Handel, and have labelled it as "spurious". The work is also referred to as Opus 1 No. 10, and was first published in 1732 by Walsh. Other catalogues of Handel's music have referred to the work as HG xxvii,37; and HHA iv/4,28.

Both the Walsh edition and the Chrysander edition indicate that the work is for violin, and published it as Sonata X. In both editions, the tempo of movement four is unmarked (but appears to be an allegro, or similar).

== Movements ==
The work consists of four movements:

	Tempo	Key	Meter	Bars	Notes
I	Andante	G minor	4/4	21	
II	Allegro	G minor	4/4	37	Two sections (18 and 19 bars)—each with repeat markings.
III	Adagio	G minor	3/4	16	Two sections (8 and 8 bars)—each with repeat markings.
IV	Allegretto	G minor	12/8	32	Two sections (9 and 23 bars)—each with repeat markings.

(Movements do not contain repeat markings unless indicated. The number of bars is taken from the Chrysander edition, and is the raw number in the manuscript—not including repeat markings.)

== See also ==
- List of solo sonatas by George Frideric Handel
- XV Handel solo sonatas (publication by Chrysander)
- Handel solo sonatas (publication by Walsh)
