= Oboe sonata in F major (HWV 363a) =

Musical composition by G. F. Handel

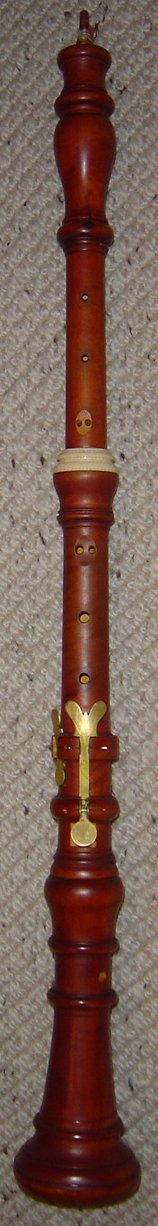
Baroque oboe, Stanesby Copy

The Oboe sonata in F major (HWV 363a) was composed (c. 1711–1716) by George Frideric Handel, for oboe and basso continuo. The work is also referred to as HHA iv/18,36. (There is no HG designation for the work.)

The sonata was later reworked as a flute sonata in G major (HWV 363b).

A typical performance of the work takes about eight minutes.

== Movements ==
The work consists of five movements:

	Tempo	Notes
I	Adagio	A typically airy Handelian adagio
II	Allegro	The theme is introduced by the oboe, but then joined by the keyboard in an exchange of little fanfare figures. Handel marks the climax of the movement by sending the oboe shooting up to its highest note possible at the time
III	Adagio	More plaintive than the first adagio movement
IV	Bourrée	A perky dance that looks ahead to the second section of "The Arrival of the Queen of Sheba"
V	Minuet	The minuet is marked by little upward melodic skips

== See also ==
- List of solo sonatas by George Frideric Handel
