= Violin sonata in A major (HWV 372) =

Music attributed to G. F. Handel

The Violin sonata in A major (HWV 372) is a work for violin and basso continuo that was originally thought to have been composed by George Frideric Handel. Modern scholars however believe it doubtful that the work was composed by Handel, and have labelled it as "spurious". The work was first published in 1730 by Walsh. Other catalogues of Handel's music have referred to the work as HG xxvii,51; and HHA iv/4,46.

The sonata was first published in the 1730 Walsh edition as Sonata X. For some reason Walsh did not republish the work in his 1732 edition. The Chrysander edition published the work as Sonata XIV, and the designation of "Opus 1, No. 14" is his. All editions indicate that the work is for violin.

== Movements ==
The work consists of four movements:

	Tempo	Key	Meter	Bars	Notes
I	Adagio	A major	4/4	13	
II	Allegro	A major	4/4	29	Two sections (14 and 15 bars)—each with repeat markings. First section concludes with an E major chord.
III	Largo	?	3/2	17	Begins in F♯ minor.
IV	Allegro	A major	3/8	68	Two sections (29 and 39 bars)—each with repeat markings. First section concludes, and second section begins in E major.

(Movements do not contain repeat markings unless indicated. The number of bars is taken from the Chrysander edition, and is the raw number in the manuscript—not including repeat markings.)

== See also ==
- List of solo sonatas by George Frideric Handel
- XV Handel solo sonatas (publication by Chrysander)
- Handel solo sonatas (publication by Walsh)
