= Violin Sonata No. 22 (Mozart) =

Musical composition by Wolfgang Mozart

- by W. A. Mozart
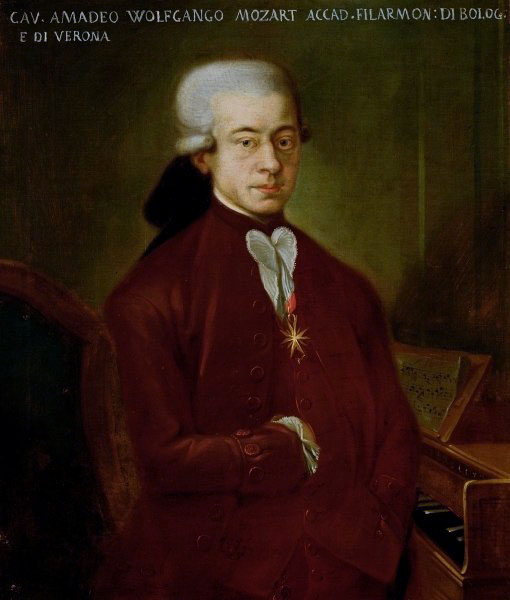
- 1777 Bologna portrait of Mozart
- Key: A major
- Catalogue: K. 305/293d
- Composed: Paris, 1778
- Published: 1778
- Duration: c. 15 minutes
- Movements: 2
- Scoring: Violin and piano

Violin Sonata No. 22 in A major (K. 305/293d) is a work composed by Wolfgang Amadeus Mozart in Paris in 1778. There are two movements:

1. Allegro di molto
2. Tema. Andante grazioso — Variations I–V — Variation VI. Allegro

The first movement is in sonata form. This movement has one of the bounciest, happiest melodies to be found in his violin sonatas. The second movement is in a theme and variations form. This movement is more somber than the opening movement, being at a slower tempo and having a more subdued melody.
