= Violin Sonata No. 6 (Beethoven) =

Violin Sonata
- No. 6
- by Ludwig van Beethoven
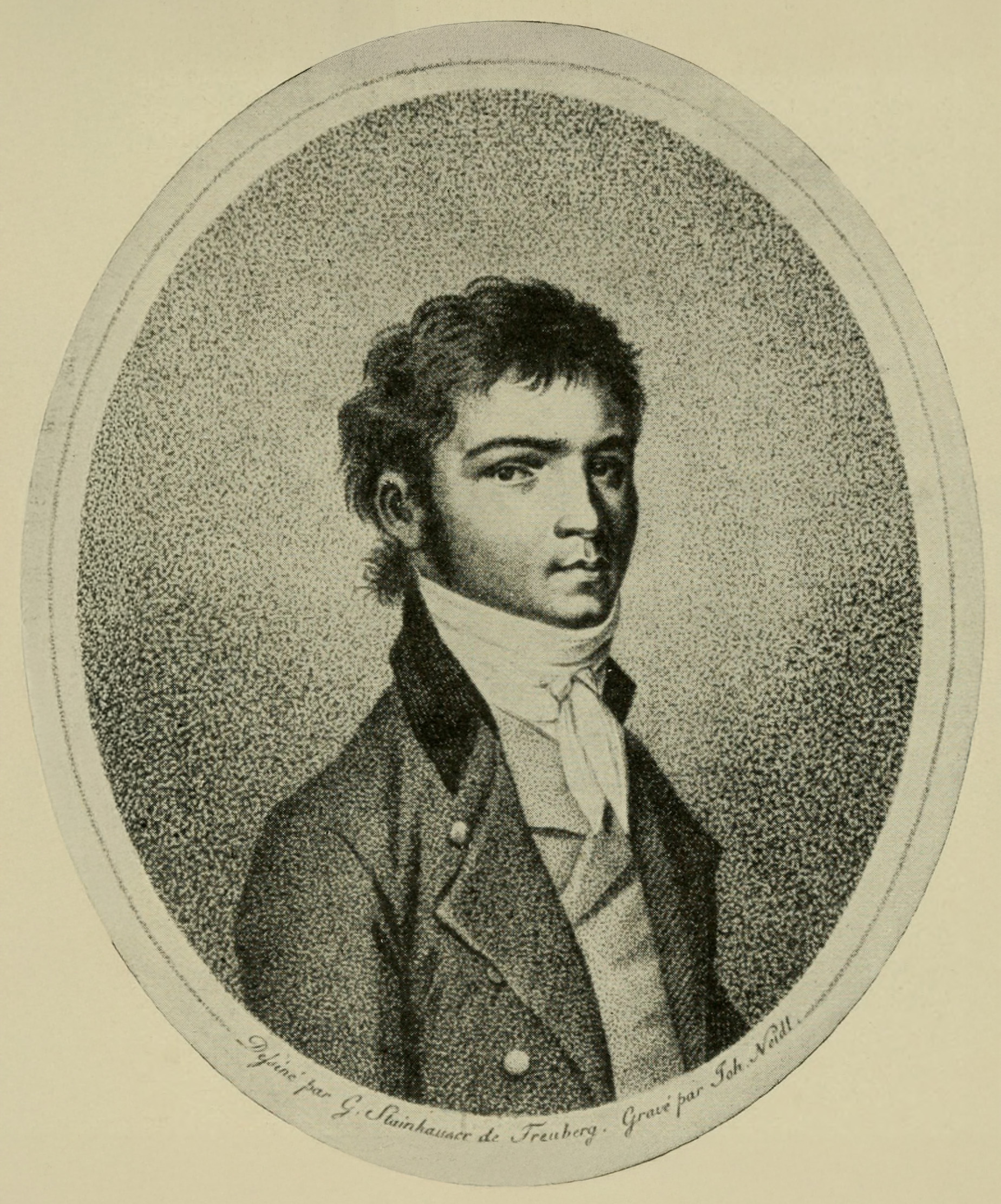
- Beethoven portrayed in 1801
- Key: A major
- Opus: 30
- Composed: 1801–1802
- Dedication: Alexander I of Russia
- Published: May 1803
- Duration: 22 minutes
- Movements: 3

The Violin Sonata No. 6 of Ludwig van Beethoven in A major, the first of his Opus 30 set, was composed between 1801 and 1802, published in May 1803, and dedicated to Tsar Alexander I of Russia. It has three movements:

1. Allegro
2. Adagio molto espressivo （D major）
3. Allegretto con variazioni

The work takes approximately 22 minutes to perform.
