= John Walsh (printer) =

English music publisher

John Walsh was the name of a father and son, two printers and publishers of music, active in London from the late 17th Century, and through the first half of the 18th Century. They published much important Baroque music, including works by William Babell and George Frideric Handel.

== John Walsh the elder ==
John Walsh (1665 or 1666 – 13 March 1736) was an English music publisher possibly of Irish descent, established off the Strand, London, by c. 1690. He was appointed musical instrument-maker-in-ordinary to the king in 1692.

Walsh began publishing music in 1695, with "The Self Instructor for the Violin, or the art of playing that instrument improved and made easie by plain Rules and Directions". At this time, music publishing had just gone through a major change, with the rise of copper engraving, instead of moveable type. Engraved music was easier to read, and permitted the beaming of quavers. It had been used extensively by John Playford who began publishing in 1647. By the time of John Walsh, Playford's firm was in decline under his son Henry. Walsh took advantage of the situation and began to print engraved music on a scale previously unknown in England. Much of his early work was published in conjunction with John Hare, and later his son Joseph. By 1700, Walsh had moved on from publishing small tutors, and had published work by William Crofts, and by Bononcini.

Walsh's engraved publications were not as neat as would suggest the work of the leading engraver of the time, Thomas Cross. Later, Walsh also used a cheaper approach, of punching the music in pewter using steel dies. Walsh copied the work of the Amsterdam publisher, Estienne Roger, whose extensive catalogue included all the work of Corelli. At this time, Italian opera became popular, and Walsh published many such operas, both in full and as individual song-sheets, a new and very popular form of music publishing.

Walsh secured the rights to Handel's Rinaldo, making £1500 from the deal. Handel is reputed to have commented that Walsh should write the next opera, while Handel published it. Handel secured a copyright patent in 1720, protecting his work for fourteen years, during which it could only be published by Walsh and Joseph Hare.

He also issued two periodicals, The Monthly Mask of Vocal Music and Harmonia anglicana. From about 1716 he started to collaborate with Estienne Roger in Amsterdam. Walsh was also a distributor for Roger's editions, many of which survive with Walsh's label (Kidson et al. 2001a). In 1726 Walsh published the Six Concertos, op.3 in 7 parts by William Babell, three years after the composer's death. At his death in 1736, Walsh left an estate worth £30,000.

Walsh's printing of Vivaldi's La Stravaganza (as Vivaldi's Extravaganzas) led to a printing of a work not in the original Italian printing, RV 291 in F major.

== John Walsh the younger ==
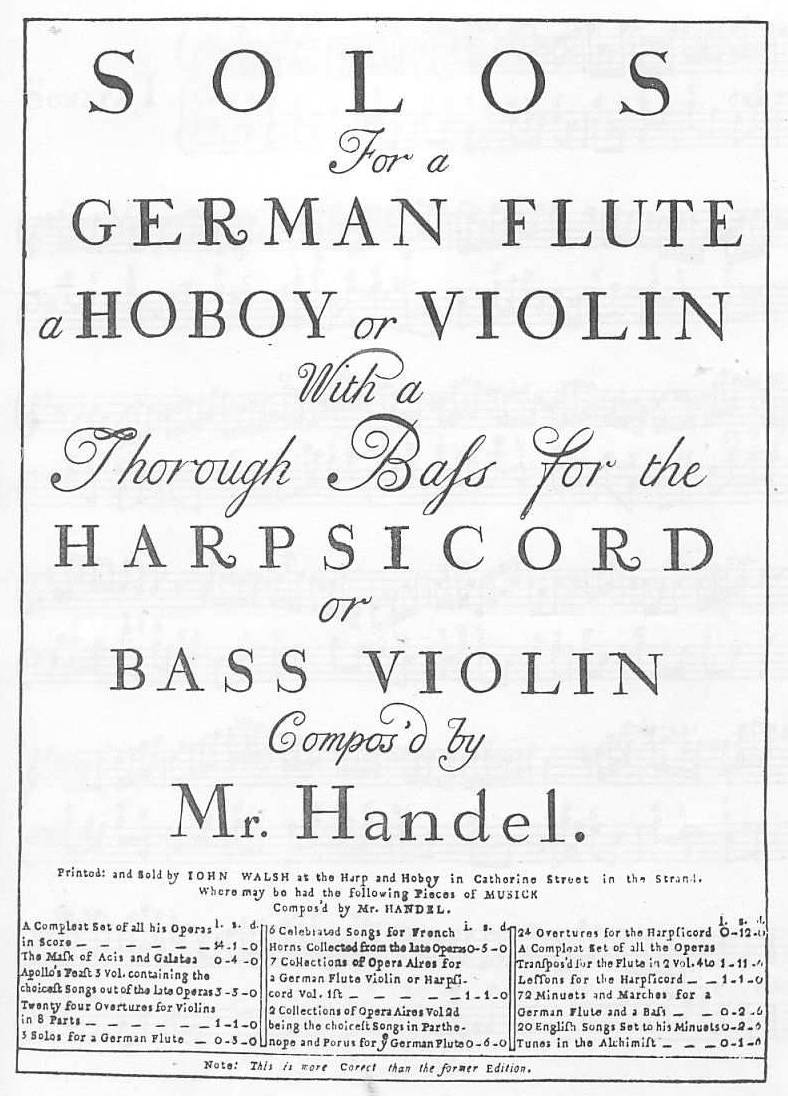
Cover of the 1732 publication of solo sonatas by Handel.

Around 1730 his son John (1709–66) took control of the business, and was responsible for developing the firm's relationship with Handel from that time onward. About half of Walsh's output was of Handel compositions (Kidson et al. 2001b).

In the 1732 publication of Handel's solo sonatas, the following was printed on the cover page: "Printed and Sold by John Walsh at the Harp and Hoboy in Catherine Street in the Strand". The cover also displayed other works by Handel that had been printed by Walsh, and the prices for those publications.

In 1738 Walsh published a set of keyboard concertos, Handel's organ concertos, Op. 4. In 1739 he was granted a monopoly on Handel's music for 14 years.

== Legacy ==
A collection of music printed by Walsh and his son, including Arcangelo Corelli's church trio sonatas Op. 1 and Attilio Ariosti's opera Vespasiano, was displayed at the Lobkowicz Palace in Prague in 2015. During his travels in England, Ferdinand Philip, 6th Prince Lobkowicz, acquired a large selection of music printed by Walsh.

== Sources ==
- Hunter, David. 2002. "George Frideric Handel as Victim: Composer-Publisher Relations and the Discourse of Musicology". In Encomium Musicae: Essays in Memory of Robert J. Snow, edited by David E. Crawford and George Grayson Wagstaff, 663–92. Festschrift series, No. 17. Hillsdale: Pendragon Press. ISBN 0-945193-83-1.
- Kidson, Frank, William C. Smith, Peter Ward Jones, and David Hunter. 2001a. "Walsh, John (i)". The New Grove Dictionary of Music and Musicians, second edition, edited by Stanley Sadie and John Tyrrell. London: Macmillan Publishers.
- Kidson, Frank, William C. Smith, Peter Ward Jones, and David Hunter. 2001b. "Walsh, John (ii)". The New Grove Dictionary of Music and Musicians, second edition, edited by Stanley Sadie and John Tyrrell. London: Macmillan Publishers.
- Smith, William Charles (1948). A Bibliography of the Musical Works Published by John Walsh During the Years 1695–1720. London: The Bibliographical Society.
- Smith, William Charles; Humphries, Charles (1968). A Bibliography of the Musical Works Published by the Firm of John Walsh During the Years 1721–1766. London: The Bibliographical Society.
- Swack, Jeanne. 1993. " John Walsh's Publications of Telemann's Sonatas and the Authenticity of 'Op. 2'". Journal of the Royal Musical Association 118, no. 2:223–45.

== See also ==
- Handel solo sonatas (publication by Walsh)
