= Glenn Kesby =

Australian countertenor

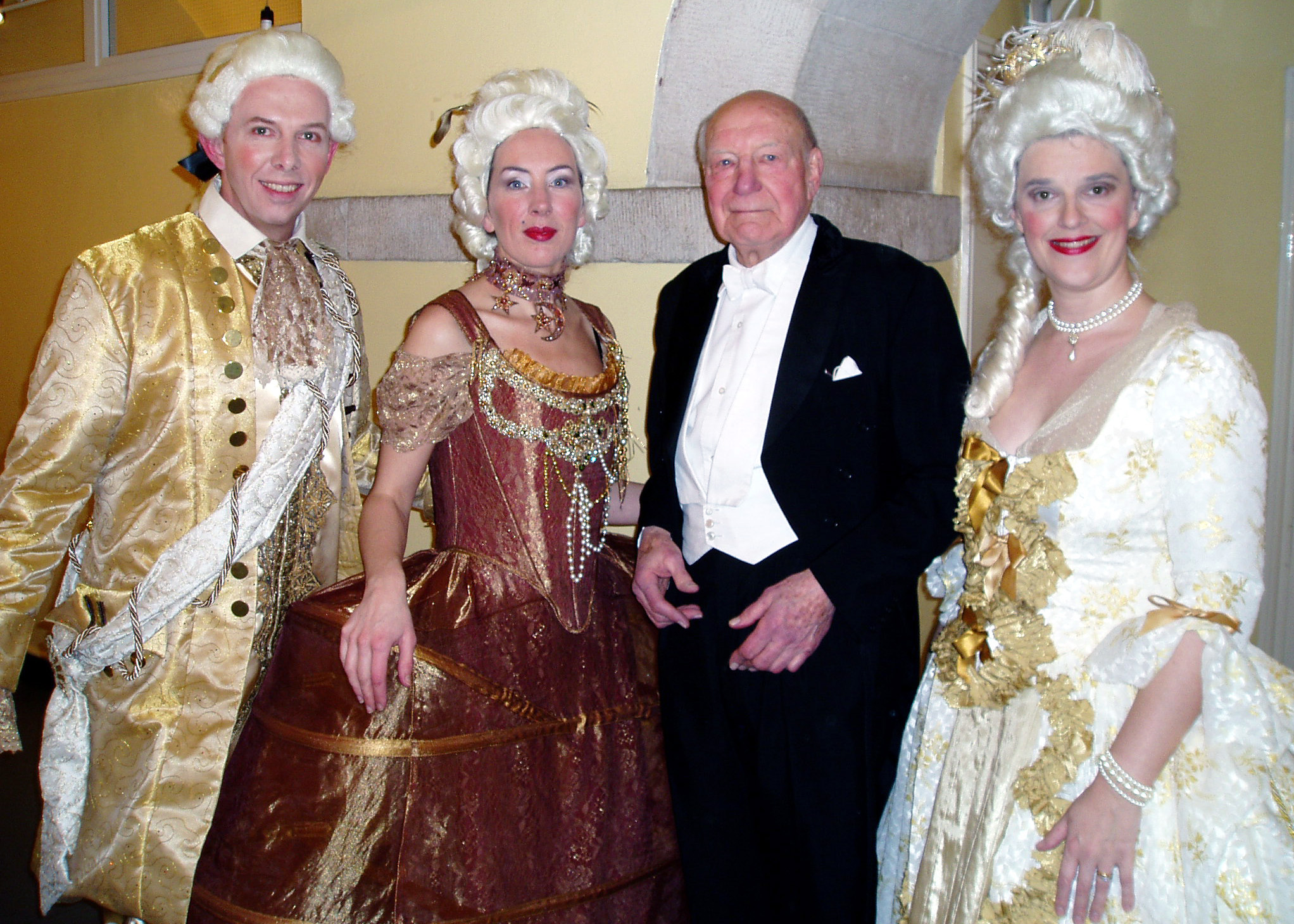
Glenn Kesby (counter tenor), Shirley Keane (mezzo soprano), Charles Farncombe, Carmen Lasok (soprano). Conductor Charles Farncombe with cast of 2005 Baroque Encounter production of Handel's Parnasso in Festa

Glenn Kesby (born 1970) is an Australian countertenor, specialising in baroque music.

== Concerts and oratorio ==
His other concerts have included Rye Festival, post-Restoration music at the Chelsea Festival, Lute songs at Hampton Court Palace, Handel's Dixit Dominus, Bach's Missa Brevis in G minor and Purcell's Welcome to all the Pleasures at the Shipton Festival.

== Baroque encounter ==
In 2004, he set up his own early music ensemble, Baroque Encounter, to stage lesser known baroque repertoire in full period costume in a style similar to the original performances.

== Other ==
Kesby is a regular concert artist at London's Handel House Museum, and with the Artemis and Hanbarne baroque ensembles. He has performed at the Edinburgh Fringe Festival and overseas in Germany, Hungary, Cyprus, Ireland, France and his native Australia. Now permanently settled in Britain, he is the recipient of a Tait Memorial Trust Scholarship to continue his studies with Mary King.
