= George Frideric Handel =

German-British composer (1685–1759)

- 1726–1728 portrait
- Born: Georg Friederich Händel; 5 March 1685; Halle, Brandenburg–Prussia, Holy Roman Empire
- Died: 14 April 1759 (aged 74); Westminster, London, England
- Burial place: Westminster Abbey
- Works: List of compositions

George Frideric (or Frederick) Handel (/ˈhændəl/ HAN-dəl; (Note: "Handel" entry in Collins English Dictionary gives the common variant "George Frederick" (used in his will and on his funeral monument) alongside the pronunciation of his last name. The spelling "Frideric" is used on his 1727 application for British citizenship.) baptised Georg Fried[e]rich Händel, (Note: According to baptismal records in Halle's parish church, the Lutheran Marktkirche Unser Lieben Frauen, he was baptised "Friederich"; however, he used the form Friedrich, which is universally used in German. The records of that church also show that the family name was spelt on various occasions in at least four other ways: Hendel, Händeler, Hendeler and Hendtler, but most commonly Händel. In Italy, he spelt it Hendel, as it is pronounced in German. From the time he arrived in England, however, he consistently signed his name as George Frideric Handel.) German: [ˈɡeːɔʁk ˈfʁiːdʁɪç ˈhɛndl̩]; 5 March 1685 [O.S. 23 February 1684] – 14 April 1759) (Note: Handel's tomb in Westminster has the Old Style birth date of February XXIIII, MDCLXXXIV, giving the day of his baptism and using its Annunciation style of counting the new year from 25 March.) was a German-British Baroque composer well-known for his operas, oratorios, anthems, concerti grossi, and organ concerti.

Born in Halle, Handel spent his early life in Hamburg and Italy before settling in London in 1712, where he spent the bulk of his career and became a naturalised British subject in 1727. He was strongly influenced both by the middle-German polyphonic choral tradition and by composers of the Italian Baroque. In turn, Handel's music forms one of the peaks of the "high baroque" style, bringing Italian opera to its highest development, creating the genres of English oratorio and organ concerto, and introducing a new style into English church music. He is consistently recognised as one of the greatest composers of his age.

Handel started three commercial opera companies to supply the English nobility with Italian opera. In 1737 he had a physical breakdown, changed direction creatively, addressed the middle class and made a transition to English choral works. After his success with Messiah (1742), he never composed an Italian opera again. His orchestral Water Music and Music for the Royal Fireworks remain steadfastly popular. One of his four coronation anthems, Zadok the Priest, has been performed at every British coronation since 1727. He died a respected and rich man in 1759, aged 74, and was given a state funeral at Westminster Abbey.

Interest in Handel's music has grown since the mid-20th century. The musicologist Winton Dean wrote that "Handel was not only a great composer; he was a dramatic genius of the first order." His music was admired by Classical-era composers, especially Haydn, Mozart and Beethoven.

== Early years ==
=== Family ===
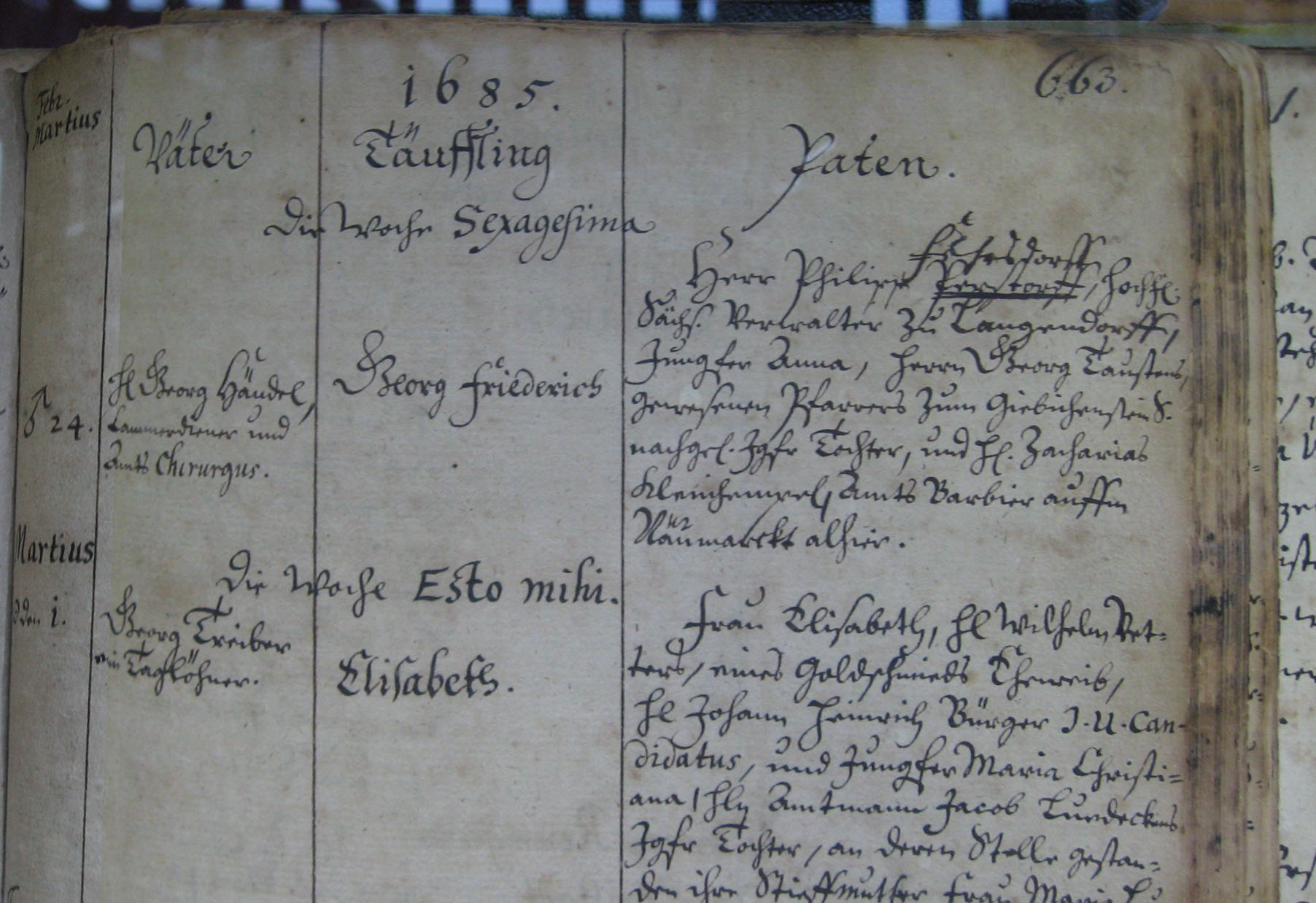
Handel's baptismal registration (Marienbibliothek in Halle)

Handel was born in 1685 (the same year as Johann Sebastian Bach and Domenico Scarlatti) in Halle, in the Duchy of Magdeburg, then part of Brandenburg–Prussia. His parents were Georg Händel, aged 63, and Dorothea Taust, daughter of Georg Taust, a pastor, and Dorothea Cuno, the niece of Johann Olearius. His father was an eminent barber-surgeon who served the court of Saxe-Weissenfels and the Margraviate of Brandenburg. (Note: Georg Händel (senior) was the son of a coppersmith, Valentin Händel (1582–1636), who had emigrated from Eisleben in 1608 with his first wife Anna Belching, the daughter of a master coppersmith. They were Protestants and chose reliably Protestant Saxony over Silesia, a Habsburg possession, as religious tensions mounted in the years before the Thirty Years' War.)

Halle was a relatively prosperous city, home of a salt-mining industry, a centre of trade, and a member of the Hanseatic League. The Margrave of Brandenburg became the administrator of the archepiscopal territories of Mainz, including Magdeburg when they converted, and by the early 17th century held his court in Halle, which attracted renowned musicians. (Note: Among the court musicians of Halle were Samuel Scheidt (who also was organist at the Moritzkirche), William Brade and Michael Praetorius.) Even the smaller churches all had "able organists and fair choirs", (Note: Halle also was noted for the quality of its organ-builders. In 1712, Bach was intrigued by the organ at Marktkirche, and applied for the position that Zachow, Handel's teacher, vacated. He decided on Weimar, however.) and humanities and the letters thrived (Shakespeare was performed in the theatres early in the 17th century). The Thirty Years' War brought extensive destruction to Halle, and by the 1680s it was impoverished. However, since the middle of the war the city had been under the administration of the Duke of Saxony, and soon after the end of the war he would bring musicians trained in Dresden to his court in Weissenfels.

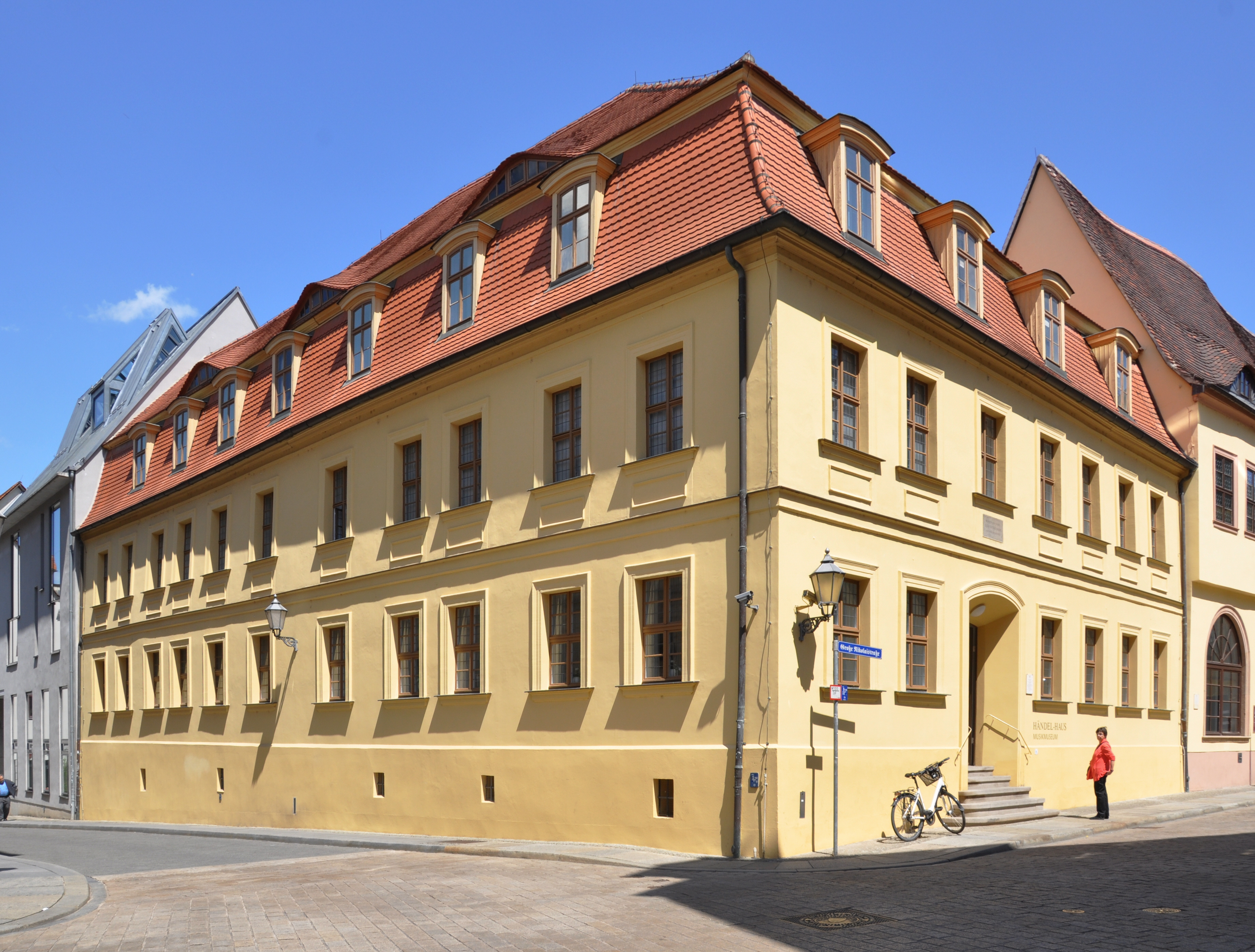
Handel House, birthplace of Handel

The arts and music, however, flourished only among the higher strata, of which Handel's family was not a part. Georg Händel (senior) was born at the beginning of the war and was apprenticed to a barber in Halle at the age of 14 after his father died. (Note: This barber, Andreas Berger, happened to be the son-in-law of English émigré William Brade, court musician to Augustus in Weissenfels.) When he was 20, he married the widow of the official barber-surgeon of a suburb of Halle, inheriting his practice. With this, Georg determinedly began the process of becoming self-made; by dint of his "conservative, steady, thrifty, unadventurous" lifestyle, he guided the five children he had with Anna who reached adulthood into the medical profession (except his youngest daughter, who married a government official). Anna died in 1682. Within a year Georg married again, this time to the daughter of a Lutheran minister, Pastor Georg Taust of the Church of St Bartholomew in Giebichenstein, who himself came from a long line of Lutheran pastors. George Frideric was the second child of this marriage; the first son was stillborn. Two younger sisters arrived afterwards: Dorothea Sophia, born on 6 October 1687, and Johanna Christiana, born on 10 January 1690.

=== Early education ===
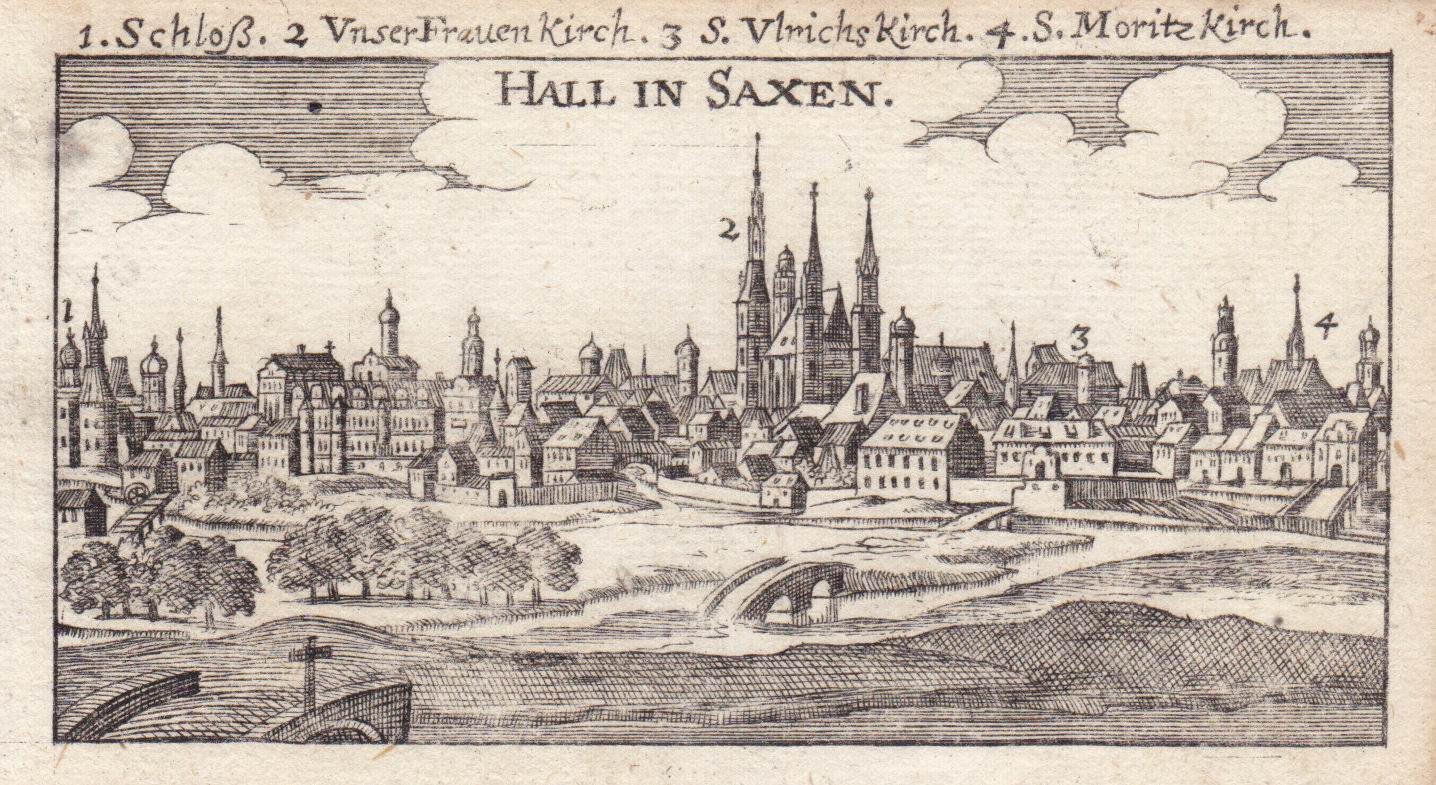
Halle, copper engraving, 1686

Early in his life, Handel is reported to have attended the gymnasium in Halle, where the headmaster, Johann Praetorius, was reputed to be an ardent musician. Whether Handel remained there, and if he did for how long, is unknown, but many biographers suggest that he was withdrawn from school by his father, based on the characterisation of him by Handel's first biographer, John Mainwaring. Mainwaring is the source for almost all information (little as it is) of Handel's childhood, and much of that information came from J. C. Smith Jr., Handel's confidant and copyist. Whether it came from Smith or elsewhere, Mainwaring frequently relates misinformation. (Note: Both Landon and Hogwood point out and to the extent possible correct the more obvious misstatements of facts and dates and inconsistencies of Mainwaring. See Landon 1984, pp. 9–19; Hogwood 1984, pp. 11–17.) It is from Mainwaring that the portrait comes of Handel's father as implacably opposed to any musical education. Mainwaring writes that Georg Händel was "alarmed" at Handel's very early propensity for music, (Note: Schoelcher suggests that Handel's "doctor" father observed Handel making musical sounds even before he could talk and this in the eyes of the son of a coppersmith "discovered instincts of so low an order …") "took every measure to oppose it", including forbidding any musical instrument in the house and preventing Handel from going to any house where they might be found. This did nothing to dampen young Handel's inclination; in fact, it did the reverse. Mainwaring tells the story of Handel's secret attic spinet: Handel "found means to get a little clavichord privately convey'd to a room at the top of the house. To this room he constantly stole when the family was asleep". Although both John Hawkins and Charles Burney credited this tale, Schoelcher found it nearly "incredible" and a feat of "poetic imagination" and Lang considers it one of the unproven "romantic stories" that surrounded Handel's childhood. But Handel had to have had some experience with the keyboard to have made the impression in Weissenfels that resulted in his receiving formal musical training.

=== Musical education ===
Sometime between the ages of seven and nine, Handel accompanied his father to Weissenfels, where he came under the notice of one whom Handel thereafter always regarded throughout life as his benefactor, Duke Johann Adolf I. (Note: The year and purpose of the visit and why the meeting occurred are variously given. Schoelcher and Bone have it that Handel was seven and they were visiting a son by Georg's first marriage, who was in service to the Duke. Friedrich Chrysander states that they were visiting the younger Handel's nephew, Carl (ten years his senior) who was the Duke's valet. Lang writes that Handel was nine and Handel's father, holding a court position, must have frequently travelled to Weissenfels, where the Duke had established a residence after Prussia had annexed the city of Halle. Young Handel was taken along because he could be cared for by relatives of his late wife.) Somehow Handel made his way to the court organ in the palace chapel of the Holy Trinity, where he surprised everyone with his playing. Overhearing this performance and noting the youth of the performer caused the Duke, whose suggestions were not to be disregarded, to recommend to Georg Händel that Handel be given musical instruction. Handel's father engaged the organist at the Halle parish church, the young Friedrich Wilhelm Zachow, to instruct Handel. Zachow would be the only teacher that Handel ever had. Because of his church employment, Zachow was an organist "of the old school", revelling in fugues, canons, and counterpoint. But he was also familiar with developments in music across Europe and his own compositions "embraced the new concerted, dramatic style". (Note: "His cantatas, often highly dramatic, are distinguished by very imaginative choral writing, colourful orchestration, and skilful handling of the concerted element.")

When Zachow discovered the talent of Handel, he introduced him "to a vast collection of German and Italian music, which he possessed, sacred and profane, vocal and instrumental compositions of different schools, different styles, and of every master". Many traits considered "Handelian" can be traced back to Zachow's music. At the same time Handel continued practice on the harpsichord, and learnt violin and organ, but according to Burney his special affection was for the hautbois (oboe). Schoelcher speculates that his youthful devotion to the instrument explains the large number of pieces he composed for the oboe.

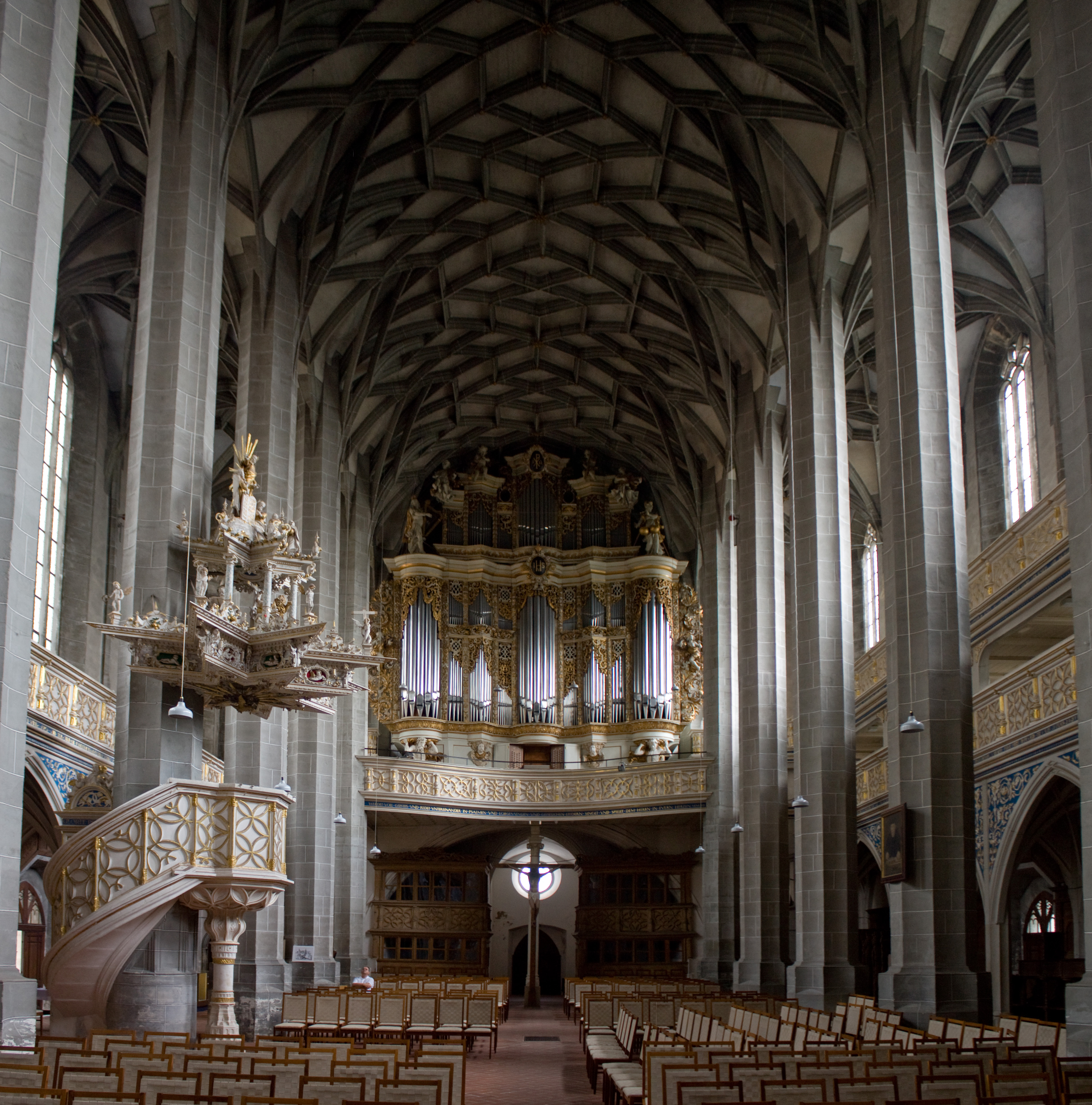
Marktkirche in Halle, where Handel was baptised and where Friedrich Zachow and Handel performed as organists

With respect to instruction in composition, in addition to having Handel apply himself to traditional fugue and cantus firmus work, Zachow, recognising Handel's precocious talents, systematically introduced Handel to the variety of styles and masterworks contained in his extensive library. He did this by requiring Handel to copy selected scores. "I used to write like the devil in those days", Handel recalled much later.

Much of this copying was entered into a notebook that Handel maintained for the rest of his life. Although it has since disappeared, the notebook has been sufficiently described to understand what pieces Zachow wished Handel to study. Among the chief composers represented in this exercise book were Johann Krieger, an "old master" in the fugue and prominent organ composer, Johann Caspar Kerll, a representative of the "southern style" after his teacher Girolamo Frescobaldi and imitated later by Handel, (Note: Handel not only applied Kerll's techniques and phrases in later compositions, he imported an entire movement composed by Kerll into Israel in Egypt.) Johann Jakob Froberger, an "internationalist" also closely studied by Dieterich Buxtehude and Johann Sebastian Bach, and Georg Muffat, whose amalgam of French and Italian styles and synthesis of musical forms influenced Handel.

Mainwaring writes that during this time Zachow had begun to have Handel assume some of his church duties. Zachow, Mainwaring asserts, was "often" absent, "from his love of company, and a cheerful glass", and Handel, therefore, performed on organ frequently. What is more, according to Mainwaring, Handel began composing, at the age of nine, church services for voice and instruments "and from that time actually did compose a service every week for three years successively". Mainwaring ends this chapter of Handel's life by concluding that three or four years had been enough to allow Handel to surpass Zachow, and Handel had become "impatient for another situation"; "Berlin was the place agreed upon." Carelessness with dates or sequences (and possibly imaginative interpretation by Mainwaring) makes this period confused. (Note: Both Landon and Hogwood point out and to the extent possible correct the more obvious misstatements of facts and dates and inconsistencies of Mainwaring. See Landon 1984, pp. 9–19; Hogwood 1984, pp. 11–17.)

=== After the death of Handel's father ===
Handel's father died on 11 February 1697. It was German custom for friends and family to compose funeral odes for a substantial burgher like Georg, and young Handel discharged his duty with a poem dated 18 February and signed with his name and (in deference to his father's wishes) "dedicated to the liberal arts." At the time Handel was studying either at Halle's Lutheran Gymnasium or the Latin School.

Mainwaring has Handel travelling to Berlin the next year, 1698. The problem with Mainwaring as an authority for this date, however, is that he tells of how Handel's father communicated with the "king" (Note: There was no "king" in Berlin until 18 January 1701 when Frederick III, the Elector of Brandenburg, became Frederick I, the first King in Prussia.) during Handel's stay, declining the Court's offer to send Handel to Italy on a stipend and that his father died "after his return from Berlin." But since Georg Händel died in 1697, either the date of the trip or Mainwaring's statements about Handel's father must be in error. Early biographers solved the problem by making the year of the trip 1696, then noting that at the age of 11, Handel would need a guardian, so they have Handel's father or a friend of the family accompany him, all the while puzzling over why the elder Handel, who wanted Handel to become a lawyer, would spend the sum to lead his son further into the temptation of music as a career. Schoelcher for example has Handel travelling to Berlin at 11, meeting both Giovanni Bononcini and Attilio Ariosti in Berlin and then returning at the direction of his father. But Ariosti was not in Berlin before the death of Handel's father, and Handel could not have met Bononcini in Berlin before 1702. Modern biographers either accept the year as 1698, since most reliable older authorities agree with it, (Note: Among the careful authorities who accepted the trip taking place in 1698 were Handel's friend Johann Mattheson and Burney.) and discount what Mainwaring says about what took place during the trip or assume that Mainwaring conflated two or more visits to Berlin, as he did with Handel's later trips to Venice.

=== University ===
Perhaps to fulfil a promise to his father or simply because he saw himself as "dedicated to the liberal arts", on 10 February 1702 Handel matriculated at the University of Halle. That university had only recently been founded. In 1694 the Elector of Brandenburg Frederick III (later Prussian King Frederick I) created the school, largely to provide a lecture forum for the jurist Christian Thomasius who had been expelled from Leipzig for his liberal views. Handel did not enrol in the faculty of law, although he almost certainly attended lectures. Thomasius was an intellectual and academic crusader, who was the first academic to lecture in German and also denounced witch trials. Lang believes that Thomasius instilled in Handel a "respect for the dignity and freedom of man's mind and the solemn majesty of the law", principles that would have drawn him to and kept him in England for half a century. Handel also there encountered the theologian and professor of Oriental languages August Hermann Francke, who was particularly solicitous of children, especially orphans. The orphanage he founded became a model and undoubtedly influenced Handel's own charitable impulse when he assigned the rights of Messiah to London's Foundling Hospital.

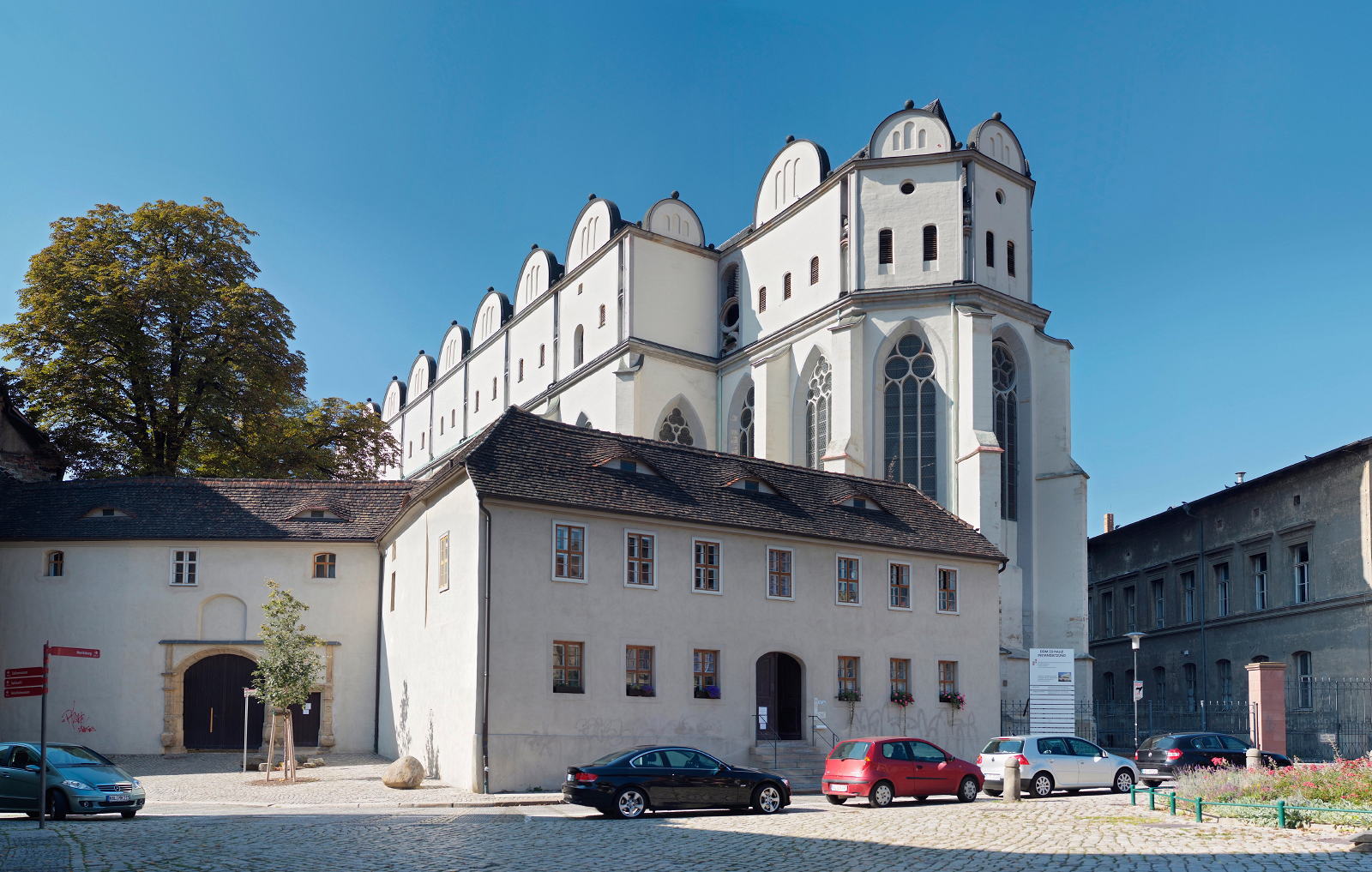
Halle Cathedral

Shortly after commencing his university education, Handel (though Lutheran (Note: Records of the Marktkirche show that he took communion there in April of the years 1701 to 1703.)) on 13 March 1702 accepted the position of organist at the Calvinist Cathedral in Halle, the Domkirche, replacing J. C. Leporin, for whom he had acted as assistant. The position, which was a one-year probationary appointment, showed the foundation he had received from Zachow, for a church organist and cantor was a highly prestigious office. From it, he received 5 thalers a year and lodgings in the run-down castle of Moritzburg.

Around this same time, Handel made the acquaintance of Telemann. Four years Handel's senior, Telemann was studying law at Leipzig and was assisting cantor Johann Kuhnau (Bach's predecessor at the Thomaskirche there). Telemann recalled forty years later in an autobiography for Mattheson's Grundlage: "The writing of the excellent Johann Kuhnau served as a model for me in fugue and counterpoint; but in fashioning melodic movements and examining them Handel and I were constantly occupied, frequently visiting each other as well as writing letters."

=== Halle compositions ===
Although Mainwaring records that Handel wrote weekly when assistant to Zachow and as probationary organist at Domkirche part of his duty was to provide suitable music, (Note: Handel was required by the terms of his appointment, among other things, "to play the organ fittingly at Divine Service, and for this purpose to pre-intone the prescribed Psalms and Spiritual Songs, and to have due care to whatever might be needful to the support of beautiful harmony …") no sacred compositions from his Halle period can now be identified. Mattheson, however, summarised his opinion of Handel's church cantatas written in Halle: "Handel in those days set very, very long arias and sheerly unending cantatas which, while not possessing the proper knack or correct taste, were perfect so far as harmony is concerned."

Early chamber works do exist, but it is difficult to date any of them to Handel's time in Halle. Many historians until recently followed Chrysander and designated the six trio sonatas for two oboes and basso continuo as his first known composition, supposedly written in 1696 (when Handel was 11). Lang doubts the dating based on a handwritten date of a copy (1700) and stylistic considerations. Lang writes that the works "show thorough acquaintance with the distilled sonata style of the Corelli school" and are notable for "the formal security and the cleanness of the texture." Hogwood considers all of the oboe trio sonatas spurious and even suggests that some parts cannot be performed on the oboe. That authentic manuscript sources do not exist and that Handel never recycled any material from these works makes their authenticity doubtful. Other early chamber works were printed in Amsterdam in 1724 as opus 1, but it is impossible to tell which are early works in their original form, rather than later re-workings by Handel, a frequent practice of his.

== From Hamburg to Italy ==
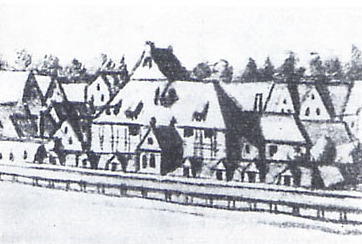
The Hamburg Oper am Gänsemarkt in 1726, where Handel was a musician

Handel's probationary appointment to Domkirche expired in March 1703. By July (Note: The first mention of Handel from the time he took his last communion at the Marktkirche on 23 April is in Mattheson's annotated translation of Mainwaring (published in 1761) where he writes that he met Handel in the Organ loft of the Church of St. Mary Magdalena in Hamburg. In his earlier Grunlage (published in 1740), he fixes the date as 9 July.) Handel was in Hamburg. Since he left no explanation for the move (Note: Mainwaring gives the cryptic explanation that since he had to earn a living from his profession, he had to find a place less distant than Berlin. Given that Hamburg's opera house was second only to Berlin's in repute, "it was resolved to send him thither on his own bottom, and chiefly with a view to improvement". The passage suggests that Handel had already determined on secular dramatic music as a career, but who it was "to send him thither" is not explained.) biographers have offered their own speculation.

Donald Burrows believes that the answer can be found by untangling Mainwaring's confused chronology of the trip to Berlin. Burrows dates this trip to 1702 or 1703 (after his father's death) and concludes that since Handel (through a "friend and relation" at the Berlin court) turned down Frederick's offer to subsidise his musical education in Italy (with the implicit understanding that he would become a court musician on his return), Handel was no longer able to expect preferment (whether as a musician, lawyer or otherwise) within Brandenburg–Prussia. Since he was attracted to secular, dramatic music (by meeting the Italians Bononcini and Attilio Ariosti and through the influence of Telemann), Hamburg, a free city with an established opera company, was the logical choice.

The question remains, however, why Handel rejected the King's offer, given that Italy was the centre of opera. Lang suggests that influenced by the teachings of Thomasius, Handel's character was such that he was unable to make himself subservient to anyone, even a king. Lang sees Handel as someone who could not accept class distinctions that required him to regard himself as a social inferior. "What Handel craved was personal freedom to raise himself out of his provincial milieu to a life of culture." Burrows notes that, like his father, Handel was able to accept royal (and aristocratic) favours without considering himself a court servant; and so, given the embarrassed financial condition of his mother, Handel set off for Hamburg to obtain experience while supporting himself.

In 1703 he accepted a position as violinist and harpsichordist in the orchestra of the Hamburg Oper am Gänsemarkt. There he met the composers Johann Mattheson, Christoph Graupner and Reinhard Keiser. Handel's first two operas, Almira and Nero, were produced in 1705. He produced two other operas, Daphne and Florindo, performed in 1708.

Mattheson was a close friend of Handel but nearly killed him in a sudden quarrel during a performance of Mattheson's opera Die unglückselige Kleopatra, Königin von Ägypten in 1704. Handel was saved only by a large button which turned aside Mattheson's sword. The two were afterwards reconciled and remained in correspondence for life. Shortly after his friend's death, Mattheson translated John Mainwaring's biography of Handel into German and had it published in Hamburg at his own expense ("auf Kosten des Übersetzers") in 1761.

According to Mainwaring, in 1706 Handel travelled to Italy at the invitation of Ferdinando de' Medici. (Other sources say Handel was invited by Gian Gastone de' Medici, whom Handel had met in 1703–04 in Hamburg.) Ferdinando, who had a keen interest in opera, was trying to make Florence Italy's musical capital by attracting the leading talents of his day. In Italy, Handel met librettist Antonio Salvi, with whom he later collaborated. Handel left for Rome and since opera was (temporarily) banned in the Papal States, composed sacred music for the Roman clergy. His famous Dixit Dominus (1707) is from this era. He also composed cantatas in pastoral style for musical gatherings in the palaces of duchess Aurora Sanseverino (whom Mainwaring called "Donna Laura") one of the most influential patrons from the Kingdom of Naples, and cardinals Pietro Ottoboni, Benedetto Pamphili and Carlo Colonna. Two oratorios, La resurrezione and Il trionfo del tempo, were produced in a private setting for Ruspoli and Ottoboni in 1709 and 1710, respectively. Rodrigo, his first all-Italian opera, was produced in the Cocomero theatre in Florence in 1707. Agrippina was first produced in 1709 at Teatro San Giovanni Grisostomo in Venice, owned by the Grimanis. The opera, with a libretto by Cardinal Vincenzo Grimani, ran for 27 nights successively. The audience, thunderstruck with the grandeur and sublimity of his style, applauded for Il caro Sassone ("the dear Saxon" – referring to Handel's origins).

== In London ==
=== Arrival ===
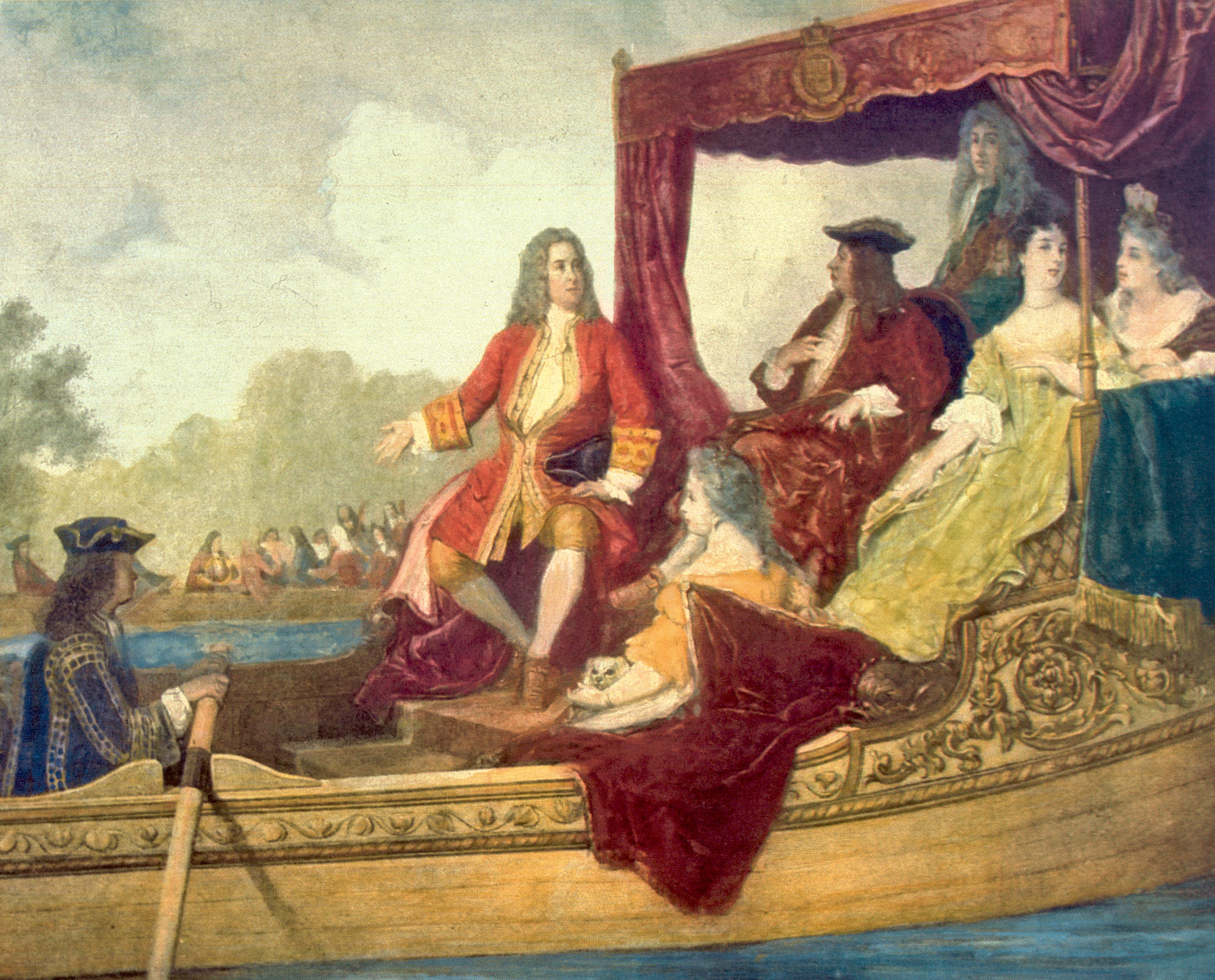
Handel (centre) and King George I on the River Thames, 17 July 1717, by Edouard Hamman (1819–88)

In June 1710 Handel became Kapellmeister to George, the Elector of Hanover, but left at the end of the year. It is likely he was also invited by Charles Montagu the former ambassador in Venice to visit England. He visited Anna Maria Luisa de' Medici and her husband in Düsseldorf on his way to London. With his opera Rinaldo, based on La Gerusalemme Liberata by the Italian poet Torquato Tasso, Handel enjoyed great success, although it was composed quickly, with many borrowings from his older Italian works. This work contains one of Handel's favourite arias, Cara sposa, amante cara, and the famous Lascia ch'io pianga.

Handel went back to Halle twice, to attend the wedding of his sister and the baptism of her daughter, but decided to settle permanently in England in 1712. In the summer of 1713, he lived at Mr Mathew Andrews' estate in Barn Elms, Surrey. He received a yearly income of £200 from Queen Anne after composing for her the Utrecht Te Deum and Jubilate, first performed in 1713.

One of his most important patrons was the 3rd Earl of Burlington and 4th Earl of Cork, a young and extremely wealthy member of an Anglo-Irish aristocratic family. While living in the mansion of Lord Burlington, Handel wrote Amadigi di Gaula, a "magic" opera, about a damsel in distress, based on the tragedy by Antoine Houdar de la Motte.

The conception of an opera as a coherent structure was slow to capture Handel's imagination and he composed no operas for five years. In July 1717 Handel's Water Music was performed more than three times on the River Thames for King George I and his guests. It is said the compositions spurred reconciliation between Handel and the king, supposedly annoyed by the composer's abandonment of his Hanover post.

=== At Cannons (1717–19) ===
In 1717 Handel became house composer at Cannons in Middlesex, where he laid the cornerstone for his future choral compositions in the Chandos Anthems. Romain Rolland wrote that these anthems (or Psalms) stood in relation to Handel's oratorios, much the same way that the Italian cantatas stood to his operas: "splendid sketches of the more monumental works." Another work, which he wrote for the 1st Duke of Chandos, the owner of Cannons, was Acis and Galatea: during Handel's lifetime, it was his most performed work. The musicologist Winton Dean wrote that "the music catches breath and disturbs the memory".

In 1719 the Duke of Chandos became one of the composer's important patrons and a primary subscriber to his new opera company, the Royal Academy of Music, though his patronage declined after Chandos lost large sums of money in the South Sea Bubble, which burst in 1720 in one of history's greatest financial cataclysms. Handel himself invested in the South Sea Company in 1716 when its share prices were low and sold them before the "bubble" burst in 1720. In 1720 Handel invested in the slave-trading Royal African Company (RAC), following in the steps of his patron (the Duke of Chandos was one of the leading investors in the RAC). As noted by the music historian David Hunter, 32 per cent of the subscribers and investors in the Royal Academy of Music, or their close family members, held investments in the RAC as well.

=== Royal Academy of Music (1719–34) ===
In May 1719 the 1st Duke of Newcastle, the Lord Chamberlain, ordered Handel to look for new singers. Handel travelled to Dresden to attend the newly built opera. He saw Teofane by Antonio Lotti, and engaged members of the cast for the Royal Academy of Music, founded by a group of aristocrats to assure themselves a constant supply of baroque opera or opera seria. Handel may have invited John Smith, his fellow student in Halle, and his son Johann Christoph Schmidt, to become his secretary and amanuensis. By 1723 he had moved into a Georgian house at 25 Brook Street, which he rented for the rest of his life. This house, where he rehearsed, copied music, and sold tickets, is now the Handel House Museum. (Note: In 2000, the upper stories of 25 Brook Street were leased to the Handel House Trust, and after extensive restoration, the Handel House Museum opened to the public, with events including concerts of baroque music.) During twelve months between 1724 and 1725, Handel wrote three successful operas, Giulio Cesare, Tamerlano and Rodelinda. Handel's operas are filled with da capo arias, such as Svegliatevi nel core. After composing Silete venti, he concentrated on opera and stopped writing cantatas. Scipio, from which the regimental slow march of the British Grenadier Guards is derived, was performed as a stopgap, waiting for the arrival of Faustina Bordoni.

In 1727 Handel was commissioned to write four anthems for the Coronation ceremony of King George II. One of these, Zadok the Priest, has been played at every British coronation ceremony since. The words to Zadok the Priest are taken from the King James Bible. In 1728 John Gay's The Beggar's Opera, which made fun of the type of Italian opera Handel had popularised in London, premiered at Lincoln's Inn Fields Theatre and ran for 62 consecutive performances, the longest run in theatre history up to that time. After nine years the Royal Academy of Music ceased to function but Handel soon started a new company.

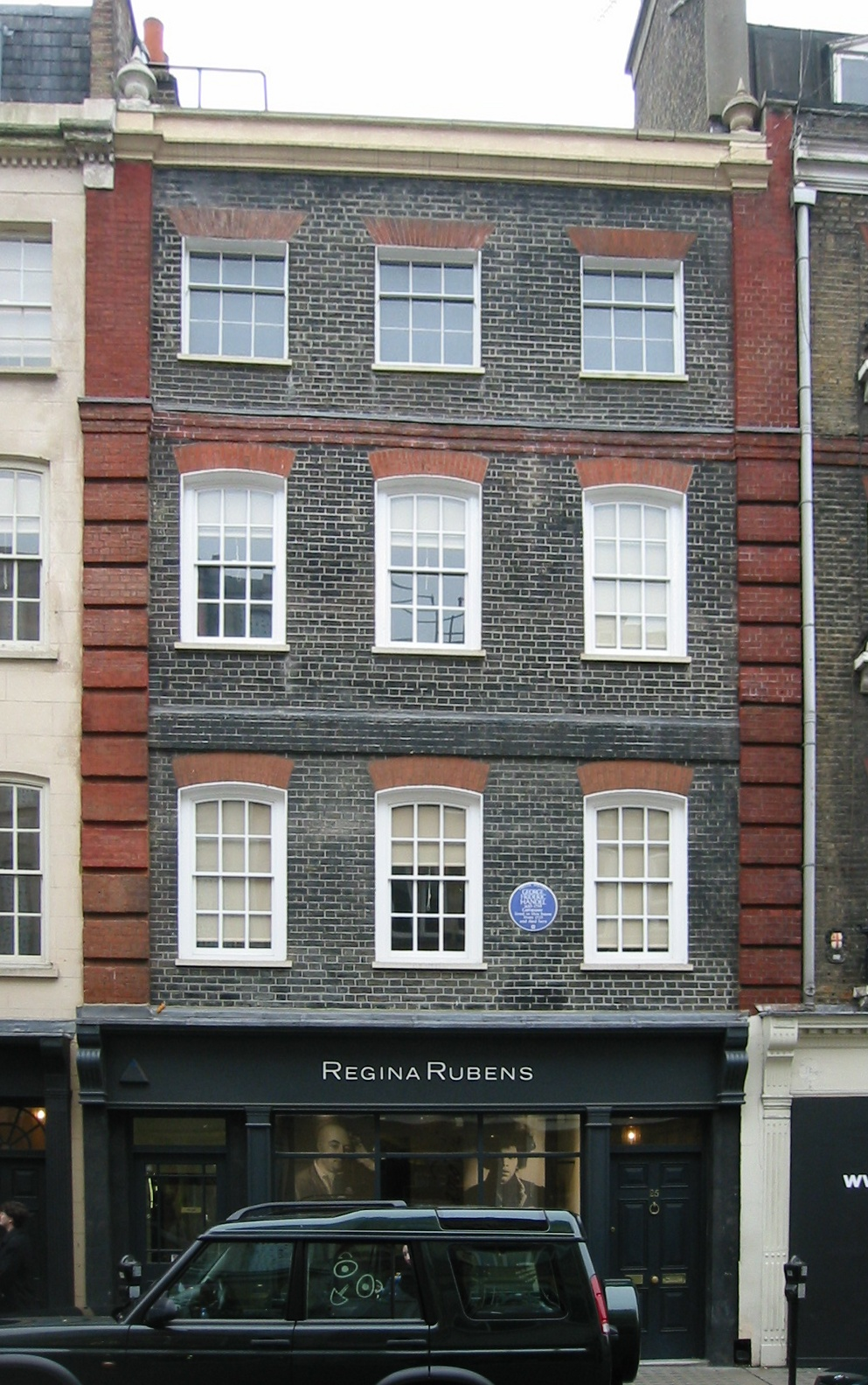
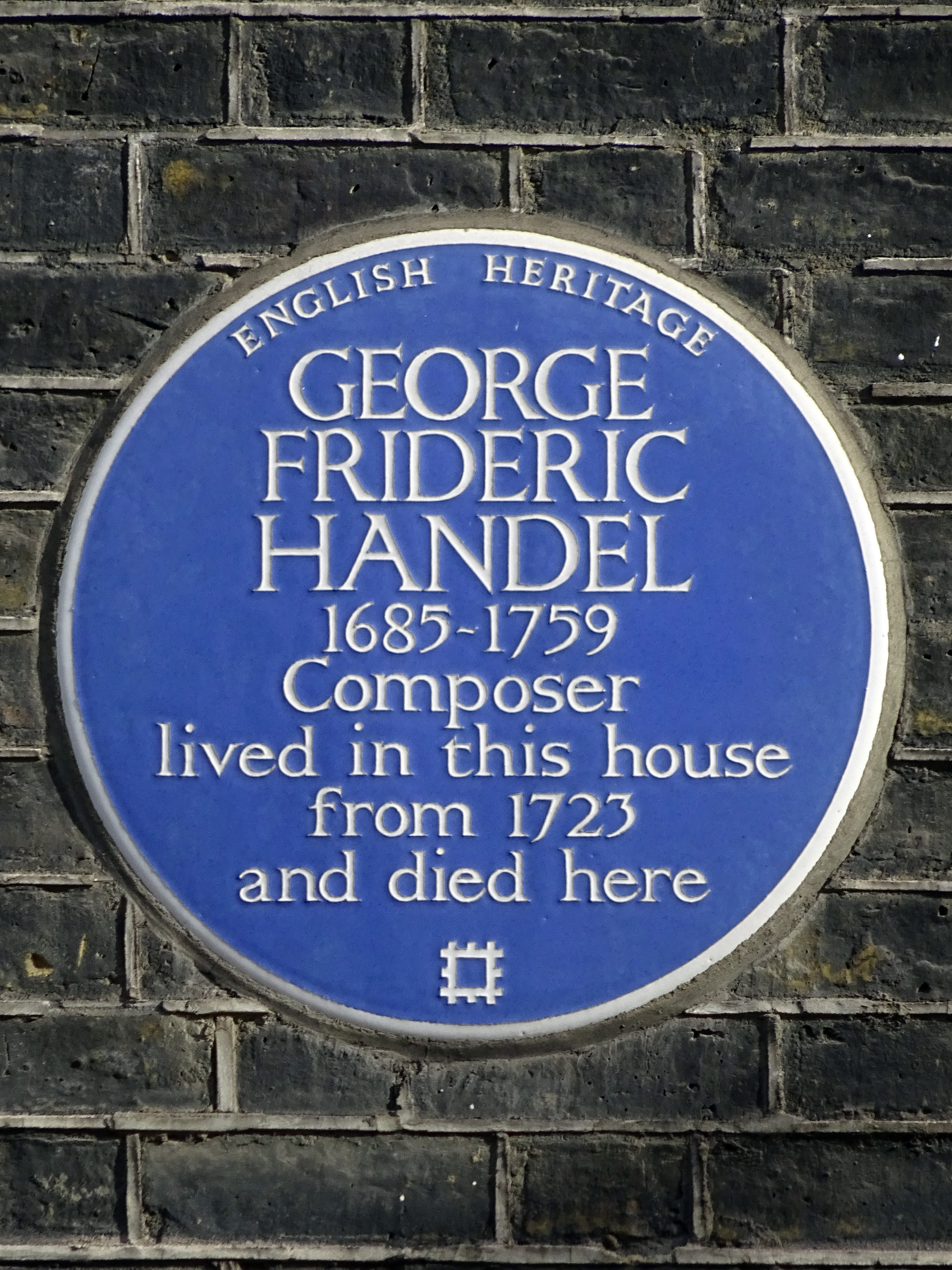
Handel House Museum at 25 Brook Street, Mayfair, London, with a close up of the English Heritage blue plaque on the wall

The Queen's Theatre at the Haymarket (now His Majesty's Theatre), established in 1705 by architect and playwright John Vanbrugh, quickly became an opera house. Between 1711 and 1739, more than 25 of Handel's operas premièred there. In 1729, Handel became joint manager of the theatre with John James Heidegger.

Handel travelled to Italy to engage new singers and also composed seven more operas, among them the comic masterpiece Partenope and the "magic" opera Orlando. After two commercially successful English oratorios Esther and Deborah, he was able to invest again in the South Sea Company. Handel reworked his Acis and Galatea which then became his most successful work ever. Handel failed to compete with the Opera of the Nobility, who engaged musicians such as Johann Adolph Hasse, Nicola Porpora and the famous castrato Farinelli. The strong support by Frederick, Prince of Wales caused conflicts in the royal family. In March 1734 Handel composed a wedding anthem This is the day which the Lord hath made, and a serenata Parnasso in Festa for Anne, Princess Royal.

Despite the problems the Opera of the Nobility was causing him at the time, Handel's neighbour in Brook Street, Mary Delany, reported on a party she invited Handel to at her house on 12 April 1734 where he was in good spirits:

I had Lady Rich and her daughter, Lady Cath. Hanmer and her husband, Mr. and Mrs. Percival, Sir John Stanley and my brother, Mrs. Donellan, Strada [star soprano of Handel's operas] and Mr. Coot. Lord Shaftesbury begged of Mr. Percival to bring him, and being a profess'd friend of Mr. Handel (who was here also) was admitted; I never was so well entertained at an opera! Mr. Handel was in the best humour in the world, and played lessons and accompanied Strada and all the ladies that sang from seven o'clock till eleven. I gave them tea and coffee, and about half an hour after nine had a salver brought in of chocolate, mulled white wine, and biscuits. Everybody was easy and seemed pleased.

=== Opera at Covent Garden (1734–41) ===
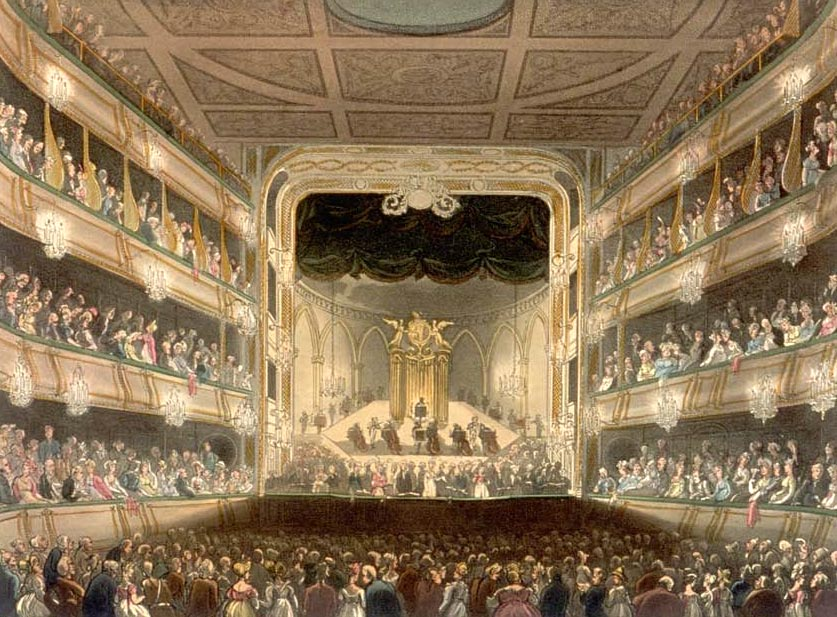
Engraving of the interior of the Covent Garden Theatre in London in 1808

In 1733 the Earl of Essex received a letter with the following sentence: "Handel became so arbitrary a prince, that the Town murmurs." The board of chief investors expected Handel to retire when his contract ended, but Handel immediately looked for another theatre. In co-operation with John Rich, he started his third company at Covent Garden Theatre. Rich was renowned for his spectacular productions. He suggested Handel use his small chorus and introduce the dancing of Marie Sallé, for whom Handel composed Terpsicore. In 1735 he introduced organ concertos between the acts. For the first time, Handel allowed Gioacchino Conti, who had no time to learn his part, to substitute arias. Financially, Ariodante was a failure, although he introduced ballet suites at the end of each act. Alcina, his last opera with a magic content, and Alexander's Feast or the Power of Music based on John Dryden's Alexander's Feast starred Anna Maria Strada del Pò and John Beard.

In early 1737 he produced Arminio and Giustino, completed Berenice, revived Partenope, and continued with Il Parnasso in Festa, Alexander's Feast, and the revised The Triumph of Time and Truth which premiered on 23 March. In April Handel suffered a mild stroke, or rheumatic palsy, resulting in temporary paralysis in his right hand and arm. After brief signs of a recovery, he had a relapse in May, with an accompanying deterioration in his mental capacities. He had strong competition from John Frederick Lampe; The Dragon of Wantley was first performed at the Little Theatre in the Haymarket in London on 16 May 1737. It was a parody of the Italian opera seria.

In Autumn 1737 the fatigued Handel reluctantly followed the advice of his physicians and went to take the cure in the spa towns of Royal Tunbridge Wells, Aix-la-Chapelle (Burtscheid) in September. All the symptoms of his "disorder" vanished by November. On Christmas Eve Handel finished the score of Faramondo, but its composition was interrupted by that of the Funeral Anthem for Queen Caroline. On Boxing Day he began the composition of Serse, the only comic opera that Handel ever wrote and worked with Elisabeth Duparc.

A harp and organ concerto (HWV 294) and Alexander's Feast were published in 1738 by John Walsh. He composed music for a musical clock with a pipe organ built by Charles Clay; it was bought by Gerrit Braamcamp and was in 2016 acquired by the Museum Speelklok in Utrecht. Deidamia, his last opera, a co-production with the Earl of Holderness, was performed three times in 1741. Handel gave up the opera business, while he enjoyed more success with his English oratorios.

=== Oratorio ===
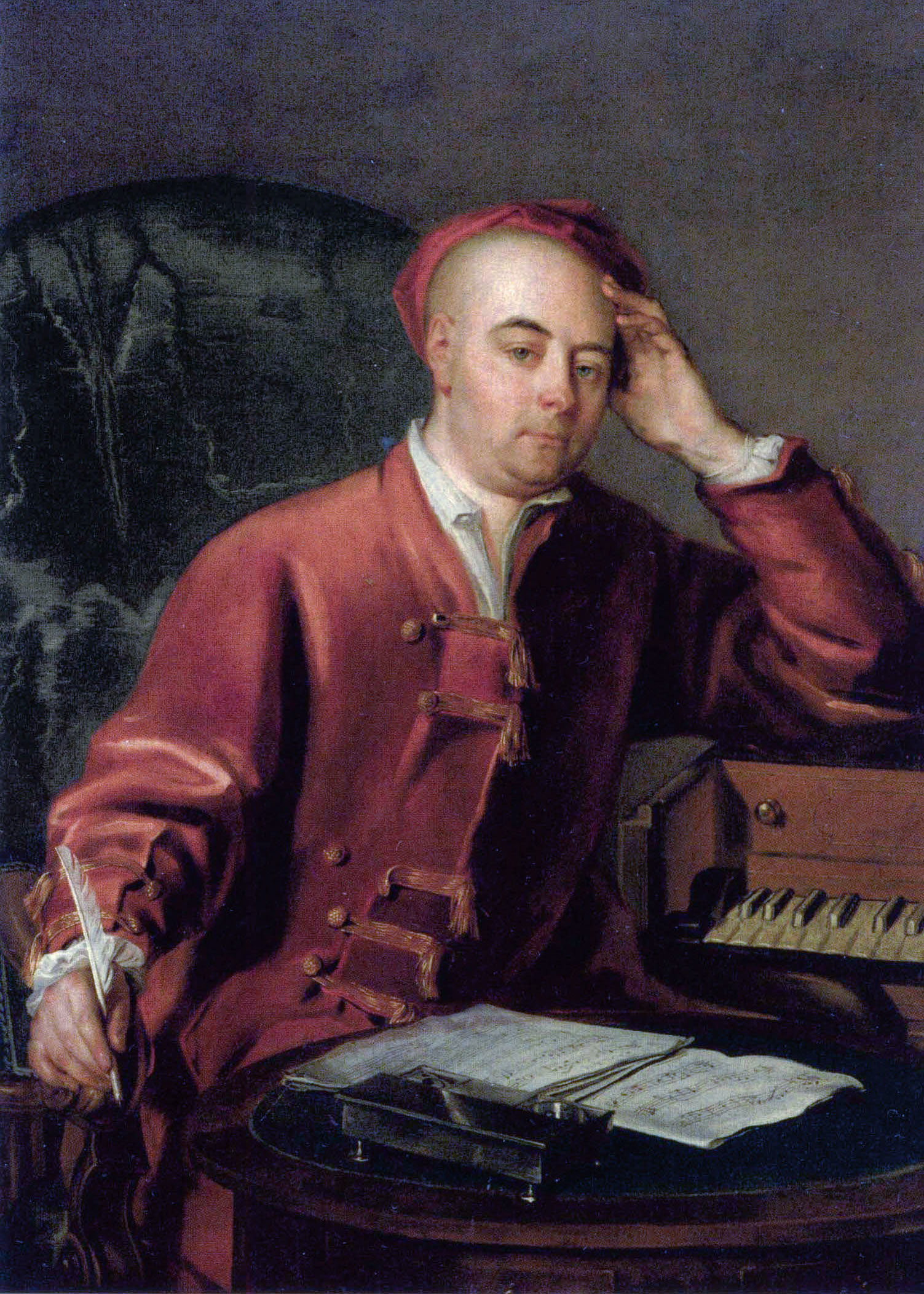
Portrait of Handel next to his harpsichord, painted by Philip Mercier (c. 1730)

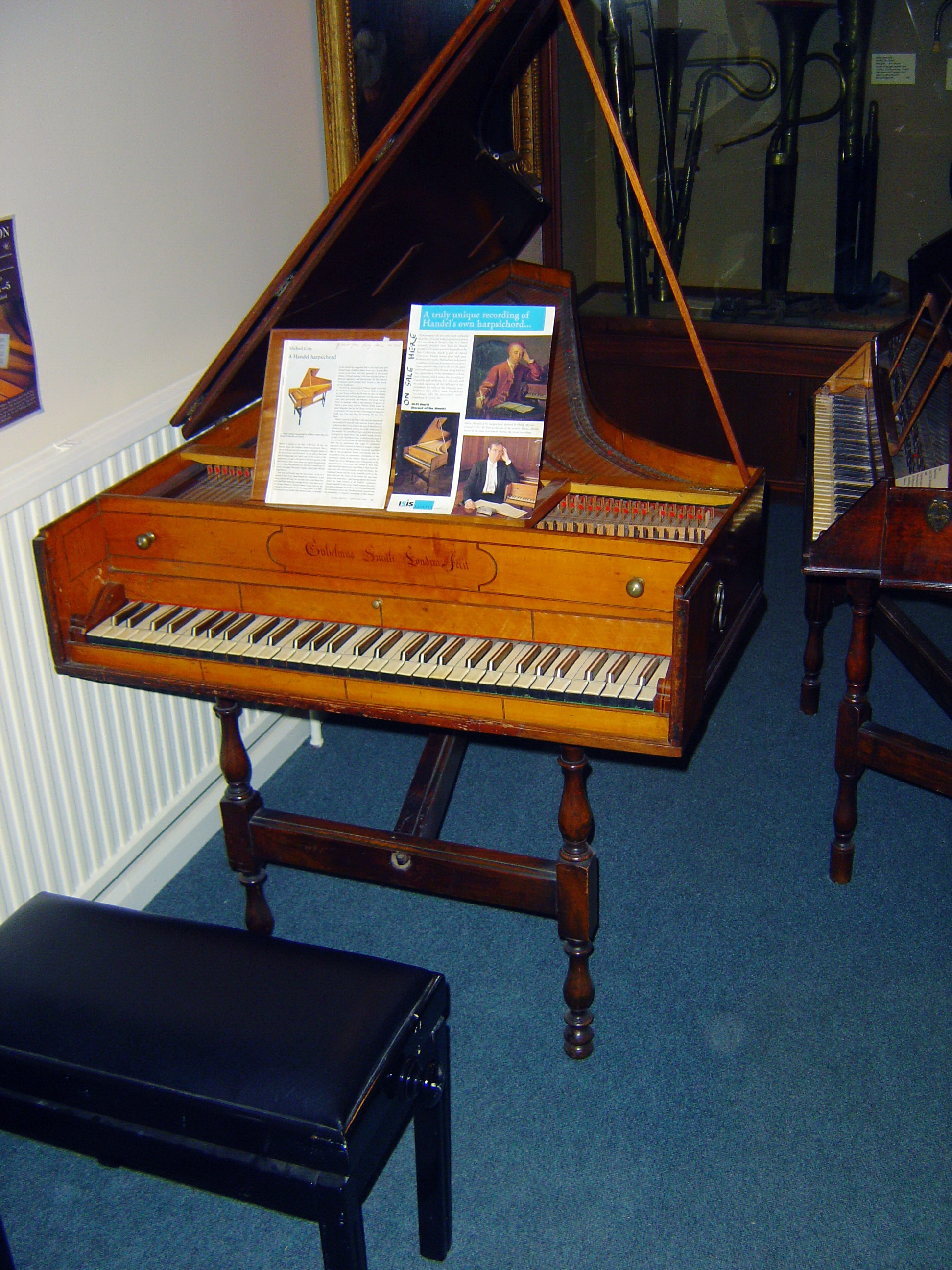
Handel's harpsichord made by William Smith (18th c.) Bate Collection at the Faculty of Music, University of Oxford

Il trionfo del tempo e del disinganno, an allegory, Handel's first oratorio was composed in Italy in 1707, followed by La resurrezione in 1708 which uses material from the Bible. The circumstances of Esther and its first performance, possibly in 1718, are obscure. Another 12 years had passed when an act of piracy caused him to take up Esther once again. Three earlier performances aroused such interest that they naturally prompted the idea of introducing it to a larger public. Next came Deborah, strongly coloured by the coronation anthems and Athaliah, his third English Oratorio. In these three oratorios Handel laid the foundation for the traditional use of the chorus which marks his later oratorios. Handel became sure of himself, broader in his presentation, and more diverse in his composition.

It is evident how much he learnt from Arcangelo Corelli about writing for instruments, and from Alessandro Scarlatti about writing for the solo voice, but there is no single composer who taught him how to write for the chorus. Handel tended more and more to replace Italian soloists with English ones. The most significant reason for this change was the dwindling financial returns from his operas. Thus a tradition was created for oratorios which was to govern their future performance. The performances were given without costumes and action; the singers appeared in their own clothes.

In 1736 Handel produced Alexander's Feast. John Beard appeared for the first time as one of Handel's principal singers and became his permanent tenor soloist for the rest of Handel's life. The piece was a great success and it encouraged Handel to make the transition from writing Italian operas to English choral works. In Saul, Handel was collaborating with Charles Jennens and experimenting with three trombones, a carillon and extra-large military kettledrums (from the Tower of London), to be sure "...it will be most excessive noisy". Saul and Israel in Egypt, both from 1739, head the list of great, mature oratorios, in which the da capo aria became the exception and not the rule. Israel in Egypt consists of little else but choruses, borrowing from the Funeral Anthem for Queen Caroline. In his next works, Handel changed his course. In these works he laid greater stress on the effects of orchestra and soloists; the chorus retired into the background. L'Allegro, il Penseroso ed il Moderato has a rather diverting character; the work is light and fresh.

Hallelujah Chorus, from Messiah (1741)
MIT Concert Choir, cond. William C. Cutter.

Arrival of the Queen of Sheba, from Solomon (1748)
Advent Chamber Orchestra

During the summer of 1741 the 3rd Duke of Devonshire invited Handel to Dublin, capital of the Kingdom of Ireland, to give concerts for the benefit of local hospitals. Composed in London between 22 August and 14 September 1741, Handel's Messiah was first performed at the New Music Hall in Fishamble Street, Dublin on 13 April 1742, with 26 boys and five men from the combined choirs of St Patrick's and Christ Church cathedrals participating. Handel secured a balance between soloists and chorus which he never surpassed. In 1746 and 1747 Handel wrote a series of military oratorios – Judas Maccabaeus, Joshua and Alexander Balus – which celebrate the British monarchy's victories over the Jacobites. In 1747 Handel wrote his oratorio Alexander Balus. This work was produced at Covent Garden Theatre in London, on 23 March 1748, and to the aria Hark! hark! He strikes the golden lyre, Handel wrote the accompaniment for mandolin, harp, violin, viola, and violoncello. Another of his English oratorios, Solomon, was first performed on 17 March 1749 at the Covent Garden Theatre. The text for Solomon is thought to have been penned by the English Jewish poet and playwright Moses Mendes, based on the biblical stories of the wise King Solomon. Solomon contains a short and lively instrumental passage for two oboes and strings in act 3, known as "The Arrival of the Queen of Sheba".

The use of English soloists reached its height at the first performance of Samson. The work is highly theatrical. The role of the chorus became increasingly important in his later oratorios. Jephtha was first performed on 26 February 1752; even though it was his last oratorio, it was no less a masterpiece than his earlier works.

== Later years ==
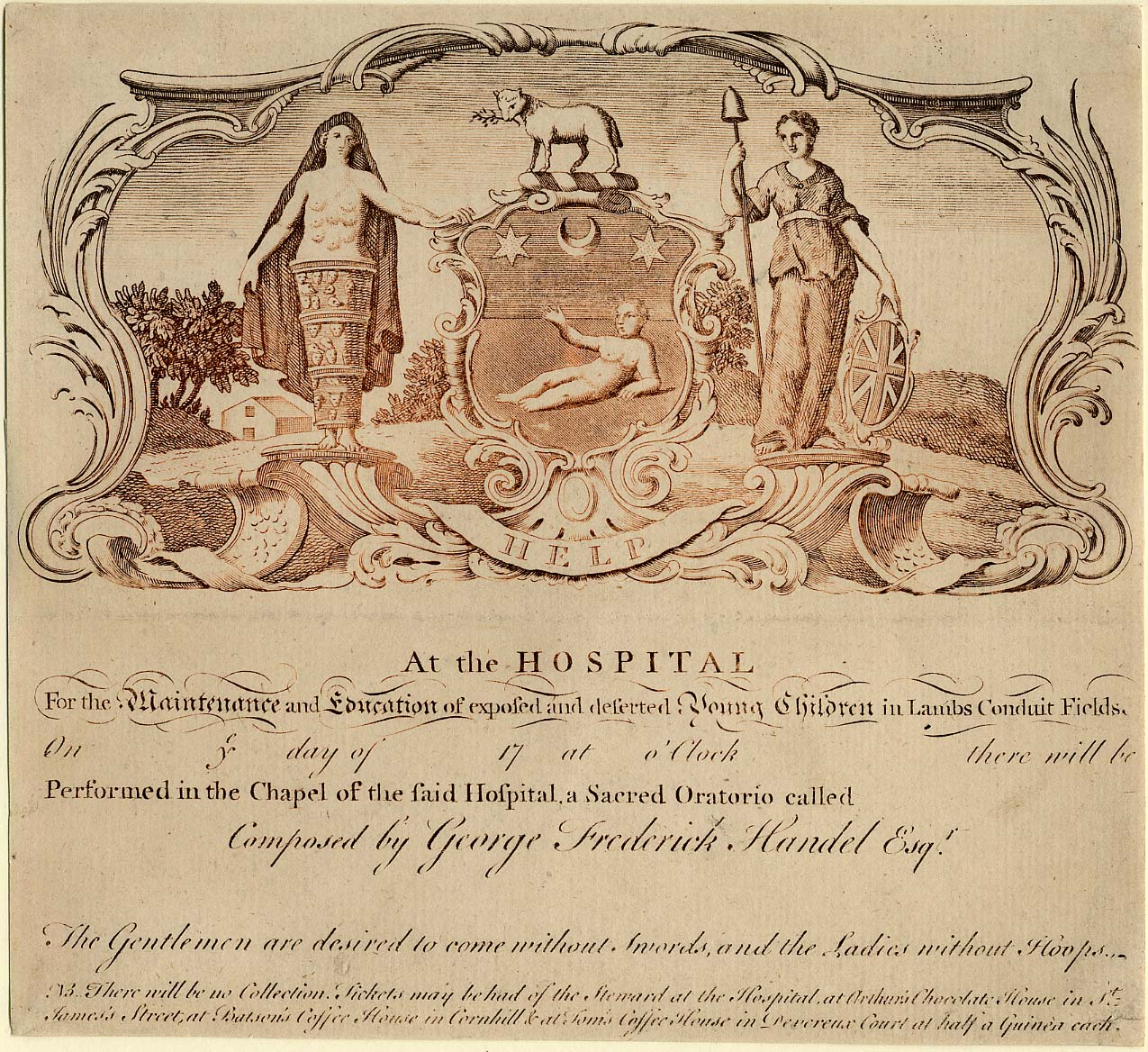
Uncompleted admission ticket for the May 1750 performance of Messiah, including the arms of the venue, the Foundling Hospital in London

In 1749 Handel composed Music for the Royal Fireworks; 12,000 people attended the first performance. In 1750 he arranged a performance of Messiah to benefit the Foundling Hospital, a children's home in London. The performance was considered a great success and was followed by annual concerts that continued throughout his life. In recognition of his patronage, Handel was made a governor of the Hospital the day after his initial concert. He bequeathed a copy of Messiah to the institution upon his death. His involvement with the Foundling Hospital is today commemorated with a permanent exhibition in London's Foundling Museum, which also holds the Gerald Coke Handel Collection. In addition to the Foundling Hospital, Handel also gave to a charity that assisted impoverished musicians and their families.

In August 1750, on a journey back from Germany to London, Handel was seriously injured in a carriage accident between The Hague and Haarlem in the Netherlands. In 1751 one of his eyes started to fail; the cause was a cataract which was operated on by the medical charlatan John Taylor. This did not improve his eyesight and possibly made it worse. He was completely blind by 1752. He died in 1759 at home in Brook Street, at the age of 74. The last performance he attended was of Messiah. Handel was buried in Westminster Abbey. More than three thousand mourners attended his funeral, which was given full state honours.

Handel never married and kept his personal life private. His initial will bequeathed the bulk of his estate to his niece Johanna, but four codicils distributed much of his estate to other relations, servants, friends and charities.

Handel owned an art collection that was auctioned posthumously in 1760. The auction catalogue listed approximately seventy paintings and ten prints, his other paintings having been bequeathed.

== Works ==
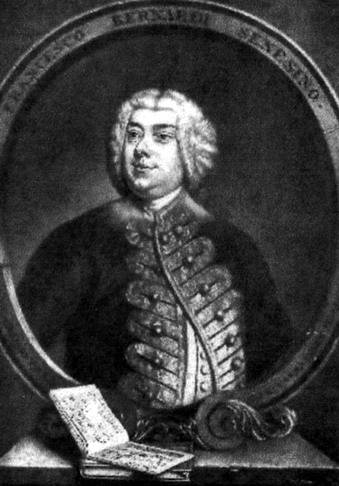
Senesino, the famous castrato from Siena

=== Overview ===
Handel's compositions include 42 operas, 24 oratorios, more than 120 cantatas, trios and duets, numerous arias, odes and serenatas, solo and trio sonatas, 18 concerti grossi, and 12 organ concertos. His most famous work, the oratorio Messiah with its "Hallelujah" chorus, is among the most popular works in choral music. The Lobkowicz Palace in Prague holds Mozart's copy of Messiah, complete with handwritten annotations. Among the works with opus numbers published and popularised in his lifetime are the Organ concertos Op. 4 and Op. 7, together with the Opus 3 and Opus 6 Concerti grossi; the latter incorporates an earlier organ concerto, The Cuckoo and the Nightingale, in which birdsong is imitated in the upper registers of the organ. Also notable are his 16 keyboard suites, especially The Harmonious Blacksmith.

=== Catalogues ===
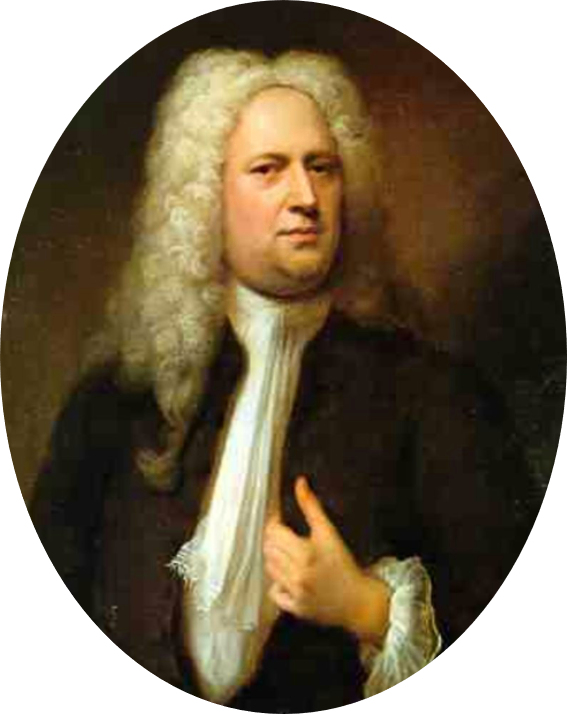
Handel in 1733, by Balthasar Denner (1685–1749)

The first published catalogue of Handel's works appeared as an appendix to Mainwaring's Memoirs. Between 1787 and 1797 Samuel Arnold compiled a 180-volume collection of Handel's works—however, it was far from complete. Also incomplete was the collection produced between 1843 and 1858 by the English Handel Society (founded by Sir George Macfarren).

The 105-volume Händel-Gesellschaft ("Handel Society") edition was published between 1858 and 1902 – mainly due to the efforts of Friedrich Chrysander. For modern performance, the realisation of the basso continuo reflects 19th-century practice. Vocal scores drawn from the edition were published by Novello in London, but some scores, such as the vocal score to Samson, are incomplete.

The continuing Hallische Händel-Ausgabe edition was first inaugurated in 1955 in the Halle region in Saxony-Anhalt in East Germany. It did not start as a critical edition, but after heavy criticism of the first volumes, which were performing editions without a critical apparatus (for example, the opera Serse was published with the title character recast as a tenor, reflecting pre-war German practice), it repositioned itself as a critical edition. Influenced in part by cold-war realities, editorial work was inconsistent: misprints were found in abundance and editors failed to consult important sources. In 1985, a committee was formed to establish better standards for the edition. The reunification of Germany in 1990 removed communication problems, and the volumes issued have since shown a significant improvement in standards.

Between 1978 and 1986 the German academic Bernd Baselt catalogued Handel's works in his Händel-Werke-Verzeichnis publication. The catalogue has achieved wide acceptance and is used as the modern numbering system, with each of Handel's works designated an "HWV" number – for example, Messiah is catalogued as "HWV 56".

== Legacy ==
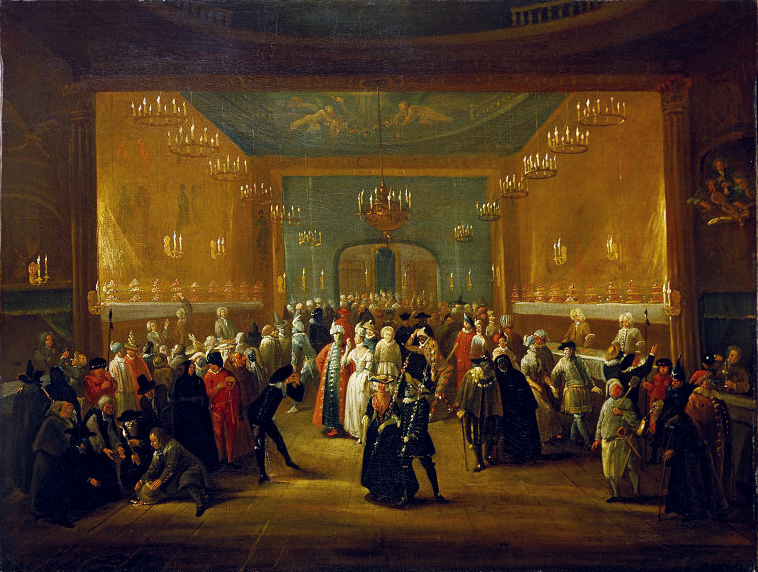
A Masquerade at the King's Theatre, Haymarket (c. 1724), attributed to Giuseppe Grisoni

Handel's works were collected and preserved by two men: Sir Samuel Hellier, a country squire whose musical acquisitions form the nucleus of the Shaw–Hellier Collection, and the abolitionist Granville Sharp. The catalogue accompanying the National Portrait Gallery exhibition marking the tercentenary of the composer's birth calls them two men of the late eighteenth century "who have left us solid evidence of the means by which they indulged their enthusiasm". With his English oratorios, such as Messiah and Solomon, the coronation anthems, and other works including Water Music and Music for the Royal Fireworks, Handel became a national icon in Britain, and featured in the BBC series The Birth of British Music: Handel – The Conquering Hero.

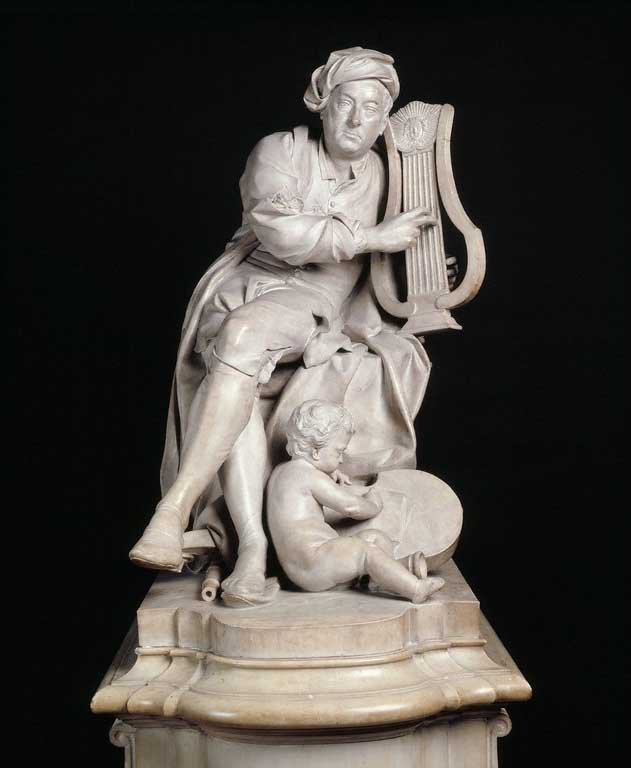
A carved marble statue of Handel at the Victoria and Albert Museum, London, created in 1738 by Louis-François Roubiliac

After his death, Handel's Italian operas fell into obscurity, except for selections such as the aria from Serse, "Ombra mai fu". The oratorios continued to be performed but not long after Handel's death they were thought to need some modernisation, and Mozart orchestrated German versions of Messiah and other works. Throughout the 19th century and first half of the 20th century, particularly in the Anglophone countries, his reputation rested primarily on his English oratorios, which were customarily performed by choruses of amateur singers on solemn occasions. The centenary of his death, in 1859, was celebrated by a performance of Messiah at The Crystal Palace, involving 2,765 singers and 460 instrumentalists, who played for an audience of about 10,000 people.

Zadok the Priest (1727)
Composed for the coronation of King George II in 1727, Zadok the Priest has been performed at every subsequent British coronation

Recent decades have revived his secular cantatas and what one might call 'secular oratorios' or 'concert operas'. Of the former, Ode for St. Cecilia's Day (1739) (set to texts by John Dryden) and Ode for the Birthday of Queen Anne (1713) are noteworthy. For his secular oratorios, Handel turned to classical mythology for subjects, producing such works as Acis and Galatea (1719), Hercules (1745) and Semele (1744). These works have a close kinship with the sacred oratorios, particularly in the vocal writing for the English-language texts. They also share the lyrical and dramatic qualities of Handel's Italian operas. As such, they are sometimes fully staged as operas. With the rediscovery of his theatrical works, Handel, in addition to his renown as an instrumentalist, orchestral writer, and melodist, is now perceived as being one of opera's great musical dramatists.

=== Reception ===
Handel has generally been accorded high esteem by fellow composers, both in his own time and since. Johann Sebastian Bach attempted, unsuccessfully, to meet Handel while he was visiting Halle. (Handel was born in the same year as Bach and Domenico Scarlatti.) Mozart is reputed to have said of him, "Handel understands affect better than any of us. When he chooses, he strikes like a thunderbolt." To Beethoven he was "the master of us all... the greatest composer that ever lived. I would uncover my head and kneel before his tomb." Beethoven emphasised above all the simplicity and popular appeal of Handel's music when he said, "Go to him to learn how to achieve great effects, by such simple means".

=== Borrowings ===
Since 1831, when William Crotch raised the issue in his Substance of Several Lectures on Music, scholars have extensively studied Handel's "borrowing" of music from other composers. Summarising the field in 2005, the musicologist Richard Taruskin wrote that Handel "seems to have been the champion of all parodists, adapting both his own works and those of other composers in unparalleled numbers and with unparalleled exactitude." Among the composers whose music Handel apparently reused are Alessandro Stradella, Gottlieb Muffat, Alessandro Scarlatti, Domenico Scarlatti Giacomo Carissimi, Georg Philipp Telemann, Carl Heinrich Graun, Leonardo Vinci, Jacobus Gallus, Francesco Antonio Urio, Reinhard Keiser, Francesco Gasparini, Giovanni Bononcini, William Boyce, Henry Lawes, Michael Wise, Agostino Steffani, Franz Johann Habermann, and numerous others.

In an essay published in 1985, John H. Roberts demonstrated that Handel's borrowings were unusually frequent even for his own era, enough to have been criticised by contemporaries (notably Johann Mattheson); Roberts suggested several reasons for Handel's practice, including Handel's attempts to make certain works sound more up-to-date and, more radically, his "basic lack of facility in inventing original ideas" – though Roberts took care to argue that this does not "diminish Handel's stature", which should be "judged not by his methods, still less by his motives in employing them, but solely by the effects he achieves."

=== Homages ===
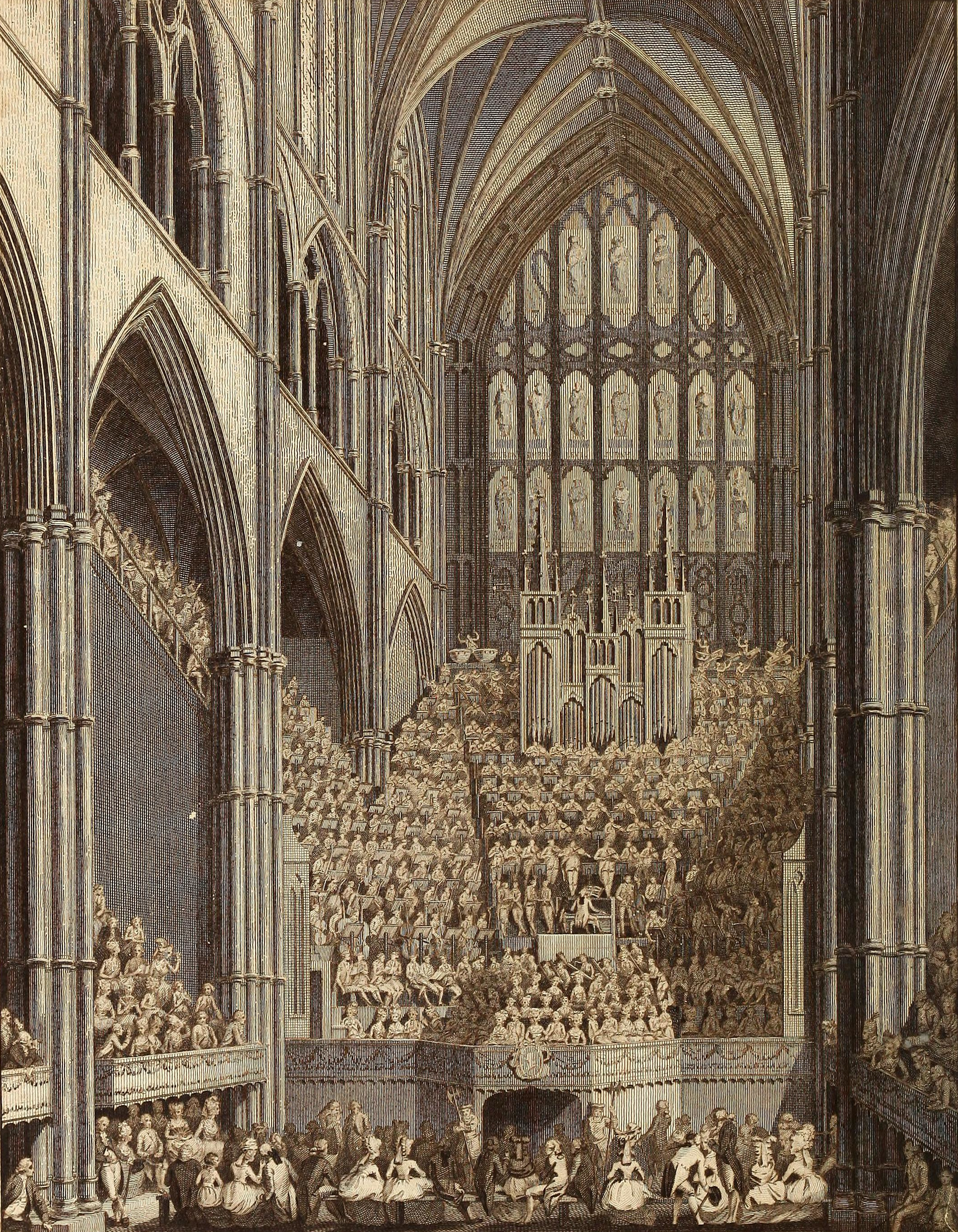
The chorus, orchestra and organ in Westminster Abbey, London during the Handel Commemoration in 1784

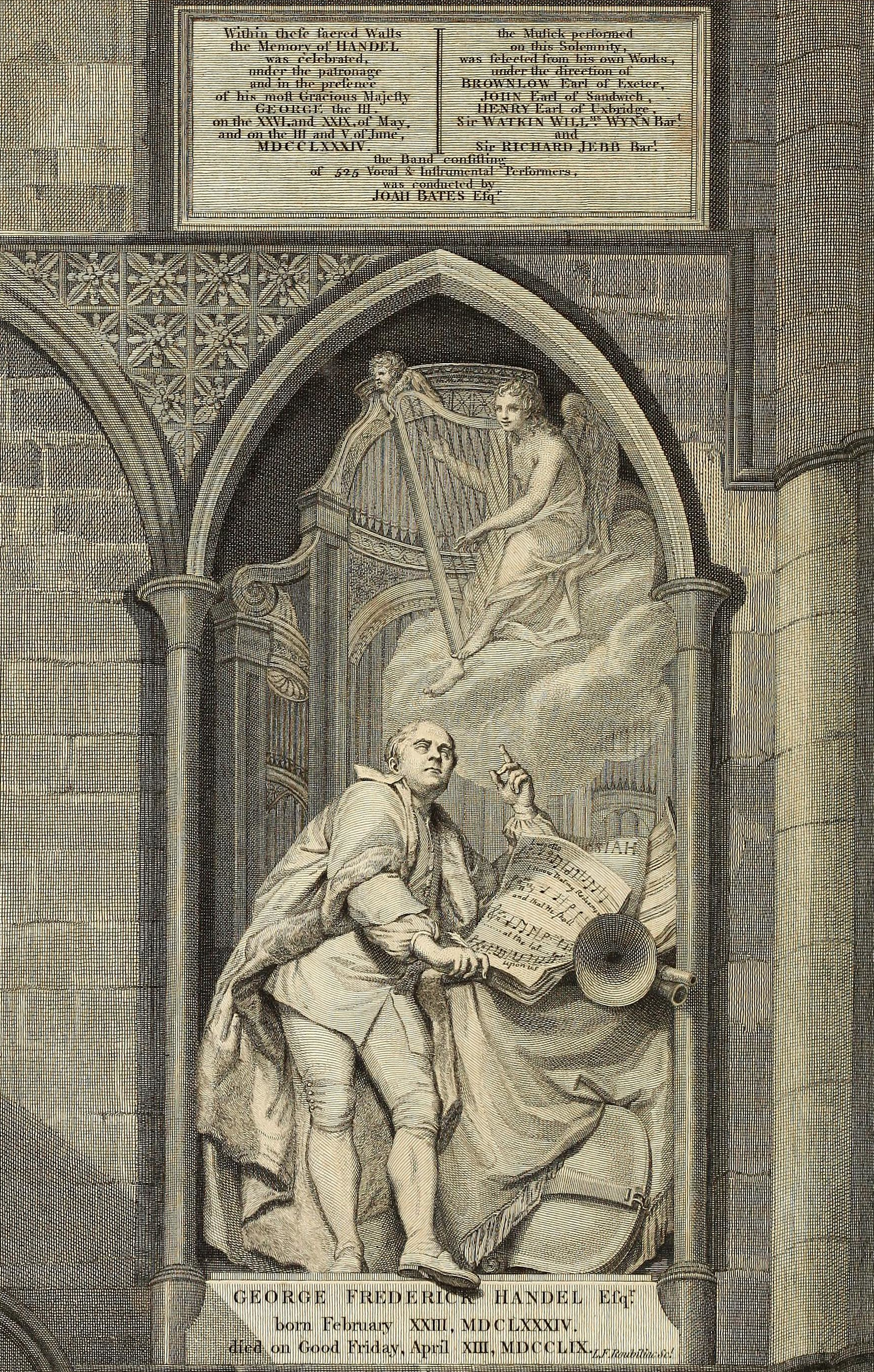
Handel's monument in the Abbey with the plaque recording his commemoration

After Handel's death, many composers wrote works based on or inspired by his music. The first movement from Louis Spohr's Symphony No. 6, Op. 116, "The Age of Bach and Handel", resembles two melodies from Handel's Messiah. In 1797 Beethoven published the 12 Variations in G major on "See the conqu'ring hero comes" from Judas Maccabaeus by Handel, for cello and piano. In 1822 Beethoven composed the overture The Consecration of the House, which also bears the influence of Handel. The guitar virtuoso Mauro Giuliani composed his Variations on a Theme by Handel, Op. 107 for guitar, based on Handel's Suite No. 5 in E major, HWV 430, for harpsichord.

In 1861, using a theme from the second of Handel's harpsichord suites, Johannes Brahms wrote the Variations and Fugue on a Theme by Handel, Op. 24, one of his most successful works (praised by Richard Wagner). Several works by the French composer Félix-Alexandre Guilmant use Handel's themes; for example, his March on a Theme by Handel uses a theme from Messiah. French composer and flautist Philippe Gaubert wrote his Petite marche for flute and piano based on the fourth movement of Handel's Trio Sonata, Op. 5, No. 2, HWV 397. The Argentine composer Luis Gianneo composed his Variations on a Theme by Handel for piano. In 1911 the Australian-born composer and pianist Percy Grainger based one of his most famous works on the final movement of Handel's Suite No. 5 in E major (just like Giuliani). He first wrote some variations on the theme, which he titled Variations on Handel's 'The Harmonious Blacksmith' . Then he used the first sixteen bars of his set of variations to create Handel in the Strand, one of his most beloved pieces, of which he made several versions (for example, the piano solo version from 1930). Arnold Schoenberg's Concerto for String Quartet and Orchestra in B-flat major (1933) was composed after Handel's Concerto Grosso, Op. 6/7.

=== Veneration ===
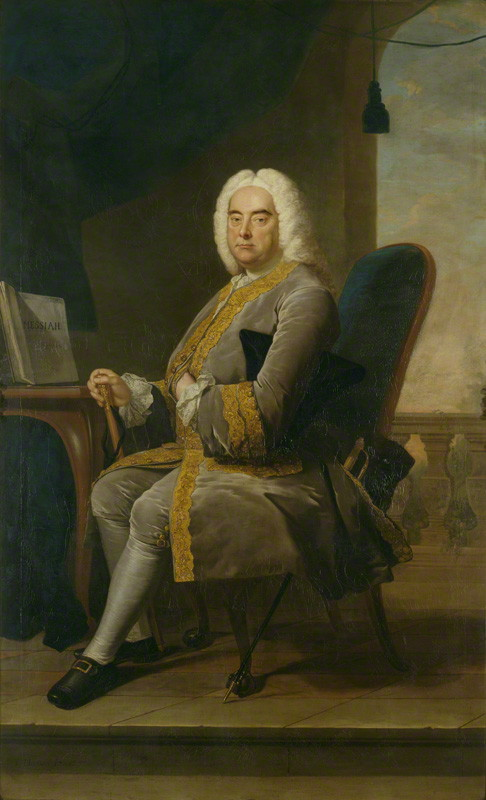
Portrait of George Frideric Handel by Thomas Hudson, 1756

In the Lutheran Calendar of Saints Handel and Bach share the date 28 July with Heinrich Schütz, and Handel and Bach are commemorated in the calendar of saints prepared by the Order of Saint Luke for the use of the United Methodist Church. The Book of Common Worship of the Presbyterian Church (USA) (Westminster John Knox Press, 2018) commemorates him on 20 April.

=== Fictional depictions ===
In 1942 Handel was the subject of the British biographical film The Great Mr. Handel directed by Norman Walker and starring Wilfrid Lawson. It was made at Denham Studios by the Rank Organisation, and shot in Technicolor. He is also the central character in the television films God Rot Tunbridge Wells! (1985) and Handel's Last Chance (1996) and the stage play All the Angels (2015). Handel was portrayed by Jeroen Krabbé as the antagonist in the film Farinelli (1994).

== See also ==
- Gottlieb Muffat
- Handel Reference Database
- Letters and writings of George Frideric Handel
- Publications by Friedrich Chrysander
- Valentine Snow
- Drexel 5856

== Notes, references and sources ==
=== Sources ===
- Adams, Aileen K.; Hofestädt, B. (August 2005). "Georg Händel (1622–97): The Barber-Surgeon Father of George Frideric Handel (1685–1759)". Journal of Medical Biography. 13 (3): 142–149. doi:10.1177/096777200501300308. PMID 16059526. S2CID 208323027.
- Best, Terence (November 1985). "Handel's Chamber Music: Sources, Chronology and Authenticity". Early Music. 13 (4): 476–499. doi:10.1093/em/13.4.476. JSTOR 3127226.
- Bone, Philip J. (1914). The Guitar and Mandolin: Biographies of Celebrated Players and Composers for these Instruments. London: Schott & Co.
- Buelow, George J. (2004). A History of Baroque Music. Bloomington, Indiana: Indiana University Press. ISBN 0-253-34365-8.
- Bukofzer, Manfred F. (2001) [1947]. Music in the Baroque Era – From Monteverdi To Bach. New York: W. W. Norton. ISBN 0-393-09745-5 – via Internet Archive.
- Burrows, Donald (1994). Handel. Oxford University Press. ISBN 0-19-816470-X.
- Burrows, Donald (2007). "Handel, George Frideric (1685–1759)". Oxford Dictionary of National Biography (online ed.). Oxford University Press. doi:10.1093/ref:odnb/12192. (Subscription, Wikipedia Library access or UK public library membership required.)
- Chrysander, Friedrich (1858). G.F. Händel. Vol. 1. Leipzig: Breitkopf & Härtel. Archived from the original on 4 October 2009. Consisting of three volumes (separately hosted online by zeno.org): Buch 1 Archived 15 December 2009 at the Wayback Machine: Jugendzeit und Lehrjahre in Deutschland (1685–1706); Buch 2 Archived 6 March 2016 at the Wayback Machine: Die große Wanderung (1707–1720).
- Dean, Winton (1969). Handel and the Opera Seria. Berkeley, California: University of California Press. ISBN 978-0-520-01438-1.
- Dean, Winton (1982). The New Grove Handel. New York: W.W. Norton & Co. ISBN 0-393-30086-2.
- Dean, Winton; Knapp, John Merrill (1987). Handel's Operas, 1704–1726. Vol. 1. Oxford: Clarendon Press. ISBN 0-19-816441-6.
- Dean, Winton (2006). Handel's Operas, 1726–1741. The Boydell Press. Archived from the original on 26 September 2009.
- Dent, Edward Joseph (2004). Handel. R A Kessinger Publishing. ISBN 1-4191-2275-4.
- Deutsch, Otto Erich (1955). Handel: A Documentary Biography. London: Adam and Charles Black.
- Dreyhaupt, Johann Christoph von (1755). Pagus neletici et nudzici oder ausführliche diplomatisch-historische Beschreibun des … Saal-Creises. Vol. 2. Halle: Verlag des Waysenhauses. Archived from the original on 3 January 2017.
- Harris, Ellen T. (2001). Handel as Orpheus. Voice and Desire in the Chamber Cantatas. Cambridge, Massachusetts: Harvard University Press. ISBN 0-674-00617-8.
- Hicks, Anthony (2013). Handel, George Frideric. Oxford University Press. doi:10.1093/gmo/9781561592630.article.40060. ISBN 978-1-56159-263-0. Archived from the original on 10 January 2022 – via Grove Music Online.
- Hicks, Anthony (1998). "Handel, George Frederick". In Sadie, Stanley (ed.). The New Grove Dictionary of Opera. Vol. 2. London: Macmillan Publishers. pp. 614–626. ISBN 1-56159-228-5.
- Hogwood, Christopher (1984). Handel. London: Thames and Hudson. ISBN 0-500-01355-1.
- Landon, H.C. Robbins (1984). Handel and his World. London: Weidenfeld and Nicolson. ISBN 0-297-78498-6.
- Lang, Paul Henry (1966). George Frideric Handel. New York: W.W. Norton & Co. LCCN 66011793/MN/r842.
- Larsen, J.P. (1972). Handel's Messiah. London: Adams and Charles Black Limited.
- Leopold, Silke. Händel, Die Opern Bärenreiter 2009, ISBN 978-3-7618-1991-3
- Mainwaring, John (1760). Memoirs of the Life of the Late George Frederic Handel. London: Printed for R. and J. Dodsley.
- Maitland, John Alexander Fuller; Squire, William Barclay (1890). "Handel, George Frederick" . Dictionary of National Biography. Vol. 24. pp. 277–291.
- Marx, Hans Joachim (1998). Händels Oratorien, Oden und Serenaten: Ein Kompendium. Göttingen: Vandenhoeck & Ruprecht. ISBN 3-525-27815-2.
- Mattheson, Johann (1740). Grundlage einer Ehren-pforte, woran der tüchtigsten Capellmeister, Componisten, Musikgelehrten, Tonkünstler &c. Leben, Wercke, Verdienste &c. erscheinen sollen. Hamburg: For the author. Archived from the original on 20 April 2017.
- Meynell, Hugo. The Art of Handel's Operas, Lewiston, New York: Edwin Mellen Press (1986) ISBN 0-88946-425-1
- National Portrait Gallery. Handel. A Celebration of his Life and Times 1685–1759.
- Rolland, Romain (1916) [1910]. Handel. Translated by Hull, A. Eaglefield. London: Kegan Paul, Trench, Trubner & Co. Archived from the original on 3 December 2019.
- Schoelcher, Victor (1857). The Life of Handel. Translated by Lowe, James. London: Robert Cocks & Co.
- Young, Percy Marshall (1966). Handel. New York: David White Company.
