= Handel Hendrix House =

Music museum in London

Coordinates: 51.513°N 0.1459°W

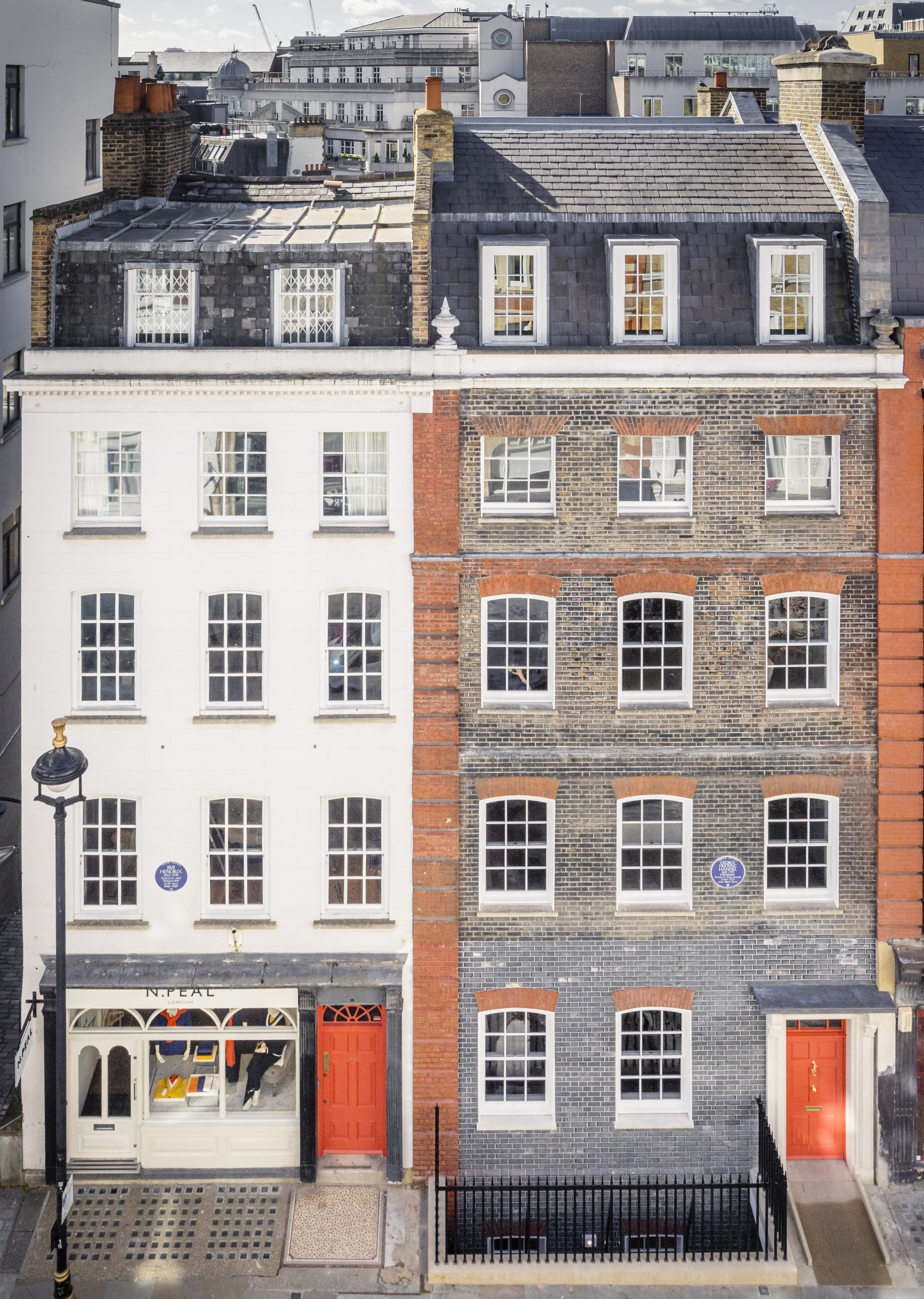
Handel Hendrix House

Handel Hendrix House (previously Handel & Hendrix in London and the Handel House Museum) is a museum in Mayfair, London, dedicated to the lives and works of the German-born British Baroque composer George Frideric Handel and the American rock singer-guitarist Jimi Hendrix, who lived at 25 and 23 Brook Street respectively.

Handel made his home in London in 1712 and eventually became a British citizen in 1727. Handel was the first occupant of 25 Brook Street, which he rented from 1723 until his death there in 1759. Almost all his works after 1723, amongst them many of his best-known operas, oratorios and ceremonial music, were composed and partially rehearsed in the house, which contained a variety of keyboard instruments, including harpsichords, a clavichord and a small chamber organ.

The museum comprises a carefully restored set of period rooms on the first and second floors of 25 Brook Street together with exhibition rooms in number 23, the adjacent house on the terrace. In 2016 the museum expanded to incorporate the upper floors of 23 Brook Street, home of Jimi Hendrix in the late 1960s.

== History ==
The museum was opened in 2001 by the Handel House Trust following four decades of tireless and dedicated hard work. The idea first sparked in 1958 when Leslie Sparey, a dentist from the Lake District, made arrangements with Viyella, who occupied 25 Brook Street at the time, for a special visit with his family. A year later the musicologist and Handelian Stanley Sadie had the same idea when he attended a commemoration held there for the bicentenary of Handel's death.

Sparey's quest for a Handel Museum started when he began writing letters to a few eminent musicians; most of this early correspondence is now lost apart from a letter from Sir Keith Faulkner, Director of the Royal College of Music, written on 18 April 1972 in response to a letter he had received from Sparey on 11 April. Sir Keith apologised for not being able to meet during Sparey's recent visit to London, commented that no one appeared to be willing to take action, and further apologised for having no time to take on the project himself. In January 1983 Sparey drew up a detailed memorandum on the subject of Handel's house in which he mentioned that despite its being a Grade I listed building, planning permission had been sought in 1982 for the demolition of five Grade II listed buildings, substantially affecting several listed buildings including Handel's house. Sparey noted that although planning permission had been refused, he understood that the Co-operative Insurance Society, who had acquired 25 Brook Street in 1971, intended to appeal. His memorandum also mentioned that a few years earlier he had helped set up a committee specifically for promoting a Handel museum, with representatives from the Royal College of Music, the Royal Academy of Music, the Arts Council and interested others; having noted that the project had been shelved, Sparey finished his memorandum by pointing out the urgent need in ensuring the permanent preservation of Handel's House. When he posted the memorandum to a number of prominent musicians and personalities, the following responded favourably: Sir Charles Mackerras, Sir Charles Groves, Christopher Hogwood, Neville Marriner, Richard Baker and Edward Heath.

By 1983 the idea of forming the Handel Museum Trust Fund had been mooted, and as a result of a meeting with the Charity Commissioner a draft statement was issued in January 1984, setting out the objects and aims which involved creating a Handel museum in which articles of musical and personal interest from the period would be available for public display, organising events including exhibitions, seminars and concerts, creating scholarships, bursaries and fellowships, and raising funds for making all these aims possible.

In April 1984 Sparey received a letter from the Handel scholar Anthony Hicks, secretary of the Provisional Council for a Handel Institute. In his letter Hicks explained that the Institute consisted of a group of musical scholars, one of them Stanley Sadie, who wished to form a group in order to promote and support Handel studies with the aim of increasing public knowledge of Handel's life and music. Hicks further explained that although their concept of a Handel Institute was not dependent on a specific location, they were interested to hear about the proposal to turn the upper floors of 25 Brook Street into a Handel Museum, whilst hoping to explore with the developers the possibility of the Institute administering or making use of the premises. In Sparey's reply he informed Hicks that the Cooperative Insurance Society Ltd were appealing against the rejection of their development plan for the area, but with the assurance that if they won their case they would be interested in the idea of creating a Handel Museum. Hicks responded by sharing the Provisional Council's plans, pointing out that should a Handel Museum materialise at 25 Brook Street, it should incorporate articles of musical and personal interest connected to the life and times of Handel; he also mentioned that if it were to be a centre for Handel studies it would need equipment out of keeping with an elegant Georgian interior, such as microfilm readers, filing cabinets, a photocopier and tape- and disc-playing facilities. A compromise, he added, would be use of the first floor as a public exhibition and the upper floors for study and administration. Finally, Hicks stated that in view of the uncertainty concerning plans for the area and that the Handel house would not be available before 1989 at the earliest, the Provisional Council would focus on their own plans without associating with a particular location.

Sparey's response to Hicks in June 1984 stressed his sense of urgency in exploring the matter as thoroughly as possible despite the uncertainty regarding plans and the length of time before Handel's house would become available, and having expressed surprise that nothing had been attempted before, he emphasised the need for a few eminent Handel experts to meet and consider the whole concept in depth.

In the early 1990s Stanley Sadie and his wife Anne set up the Handel House Trust, the charity which eventually oversaw the conversion of the house into a museum. Having raised funds through a Heritage Lottery Fund grant they were able to purchase the lease of 25 Brook Street from the Co-operative Insurance Society, who had held the freehold since 1971. Following a long period of extensive renovation work, 25 Brook Street finally opened its doors as the Handel House Museum on 8 November 2001.

== The Museum ==
The house has been restored to look as it did during Handel's 36-year occupancy from 1723 to 1759. A typical early 18th-century London terrace house, it comprises a basement, three main storeys and an attic, and Handel was the first occupant. The attic was later converted into a fourth full floor. The ground floor is a shop not associated with the Museum, and the upper floors are leased to a charity called the Handel House Trust, and have been open to the public since 8 November 2001.

The interiors have been restored to the somewhat spartan style of the Georgian era, using mostly architectural elements from elsewhere, since, apart from the staircase, few of the original interior features survived.

The Handel House Collection Trust has assembled a collection of Handel memorabilia, including the Byrne Collection of several hundred items, which was acquired in 1998.

== History of 25 Brook Street ==
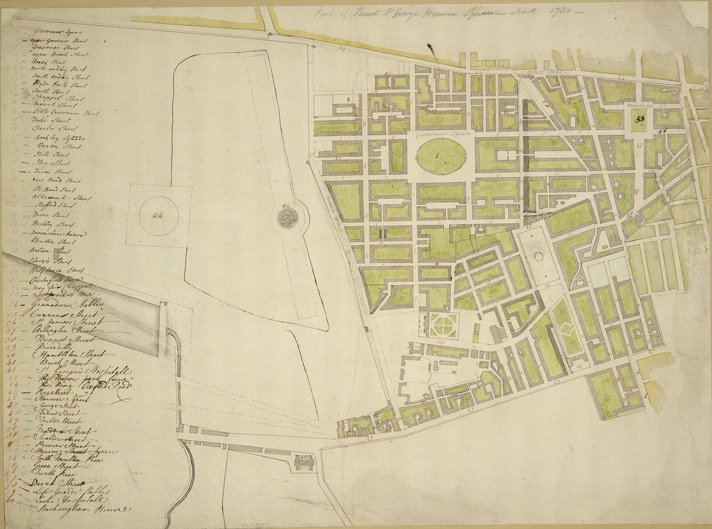
The parish of St George's, Hanover Square, in 1730, showing Hyde Park, Grosvenor Square and Hanover Square, (top, l. to r.) with Brook Street joining them

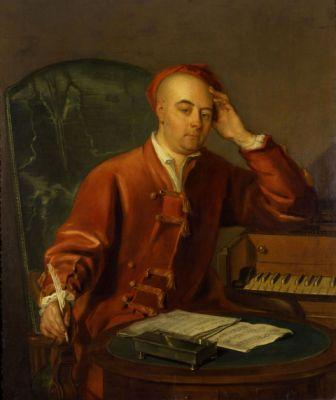
Philip Mercier: Handel composing at a single manual harpsichord, c 1730

Handel acquired 25 Brook Street in the summer of 1723, shortly after having been appointed by George II as composer to the Chapel Royal, for which he was paid £400 per annum. The house had been newly built with Nos. 23, 27/29 and 31 by George Barnes as part of the planned extension of Brook Street, linking Hanover Square with Grosvenor Square, between 1717 and 1726. Originally, as a foreign national, Handel was not eligible to buy or take long-term leases on property in London; and even when he acquired British nationality in 1727, Handel continued renting the property on short-term leases. The fact that he remained there for the rest of his life, almost 40 years, is remarkable, since opera composers at the time were rarely of fixed abode; prior to that, Handel had been lodged in the homes of friends and patrons. At the age of 38, Handel had become accepted within the higher echelons of British society, with whom he freely mixed. His immediate neighbours on either side were from the upper middle classes and initially included the Member of Parliament, John Monckton, who later became the first Viscount Galway in 1727. The layout of the rooms followed the conventions for a modest Georgian townhouse: the basement contained the kitchens; on each of the three floors above, there was a front room and a smaller back room with an adjacent closet; under the roof were garrets for servants.

The larger front first room was used for rehearsal and probably contained a harpsichord and a small house chamber organ. The museum currently contains a reproduction of a period harpsichord of the Flemish firm Ruckers; a reproduction of a period chamber organ, based on the designs of the organbuilders Richard Bridge and Thomas Parker, was made for the Handel House Trust in 1998 and can be seen in Handel's parish church, St George's, Hanover Square, round the corner from Brook Street.

From the 1730s onwards there are many references to rehearsals of operas and oratorios at Brook Street by Handel's friends and fellow musicians. Listening to a rehearsal of Alcina with the soprano Anna Maria Strada, Mrs Pendarves commented, "Whilst Mr Handel was playing his part, I could not help thinking him a necromancer in the midst of his enchantments." Messiah was also rehearsed there; the lead violinist Abraham Wilson recounted to the musicologist Charles Burney "how civilly he had been attended by him [Handel] to the door, and how carefully cautioned, after being heated by a crowded room and hard labour, at the rehearsal in Brook-street, not to stir without a [Sedan] chair."

The adjacent room at the rear of the house was Handel's composing room and probably contained Handel's clavichord, an instrument Handel used when composing, portable enough to be taken on journeys and which, according to an anecdote oft-repeated by his biographers, he secretly played as a child in the garret of his house, in defiance of his father. Handel's clavichord was built in 1726 by the Italian instrument maker Annibale Traeri from Modena; it is now in the Maidstone Museum & Art Gallery in Kent.

The remaining rooms on the second floor comprised a main bedroom containing a full tester bed dressed in crimson harateen, (Note: Harateen is a wool fabric used in upholstery.) connected to a dressing room and closet in the back. The servants, three or more in number, occupied the garret rooms on the floor above.

Handel used his house not only for entertainment, composition and rehearsal, but also for business: in the late 1730s the scores of Alexander's Feast and other works could be purchased directly there. His home also contained an extensive art collection, and by the end of his life Handel possessed over 80 paintings and prints, including works by Watteau, Teniers and Poussin.

After Handel's death in 1759, his musical instruments passed to John Christopher Smith and his son of the same name: the father had been summoned from the continent by Handel to act as his copyist when Handel first arrived in London, and his son had acted as amanuensis and assistant when Handel's blindness prevented him from writing and conducting in his later years. The tenancy of the house and Handel's clothing passed to his servant John Du Burk. The detailed inventory, a transcript of which is now stored in the British Library, gives a clear guide as to how the house was decorated and used. Apart from the conversion of the garrets into a fourth storey in the 1830s, the house remained largely unchanged until 1905, when C. J. Charles converted the house into a shop, removing the original façade and the internal dividing walls. It was subsequently occupied by interior decorators and antiques dealers. In 1971 it was acquired by the Co-operative Insurance Society and the Handel House Trust has leased the upper storeys of the property since 2000.

== Restoration ==
2 pr Stairs foreward
a bedstead with whole teaster Crimson haritten furniture a feather bed bolster 2 pillows a White Mattress three blanketts & a Quilt 3 pr of Red Window Curtains & Rods a Stove Tongs & Poker. 6 Old Matted Chairs a Round Close Stool & white pann a Wicker Fire Screen a Glass in Wall'd frame

— An Inventory of the Household Goods of George Frederick Handel, Esqr, Deceased taken at his Late Dwelling House on Upper Brook Street, St. George's, Hanover Square, 27 August 1759

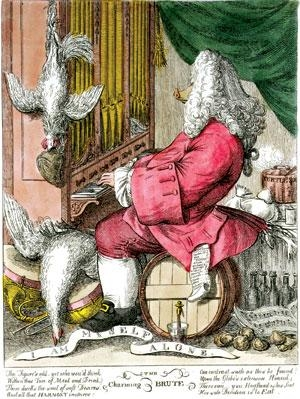
Joseph Goupy, 1754: Caricature of Handel playing a chamber organ.

When the Handel House Trust leased 25 Brook Street in 2000, it had already been decided that Handel's rooms on the first and second floors would be restored to their prior eighteenth-century state as far as possible. This was justified by the fact that it was only Handel's occupancy that had led to the classification as a Grade I listed building and by the presence of an internal period staircase in near-perfect condition. Later partition walls were removed to restore the original Georgian room plans. The refurbishment of the interior, including panelling, shutters, window seats and cornices, was based primarily on period details from the adjacent house at 27/29 Brook Street. Three marble Georgian fireplaces, formerly in Russell Street, Covent Garden, were installed in the first-floor rooms and bedroom. The floorboards were replaced with old wood, treated with lime and wax, and the ceilings refinished with lime plaster.

Careful research revealed samples of the original 1720s paint on woodwork on the staircase and surviving second floor door, which in its history had been painted 28 times. The original colour was lead grey throughout the house and No. 27/29; the door had been subsequently painted chocolate brown, a colour popular in Georgian times for concealing grime. These are the colours that have been used to redecorate the house, with more grey on the first floor to indicate its importance. (Note: Patrick Baty carried out the paint analysis and advised on the paint colours.)

The detailed two-page inventory from August 1759, made after more valuable items had been removed, gave a guide to the furnishings of the house. The paired curtains mentioned in the inventory, although in vogue in the 1720s, had fallen out of fashion by the 1750s. On the first floor the curtains would have been of green silk, but are listed only for the back room; possibly there were none in the rehearsal room in the front for acoustic reasons.

Most of the furniture was in walnut with a few tables in oak. Although none of Handel's original furniture has been found, pieces have been placed in the rooms which adhere as closely as possible to the inventory. The large full tester bed with its crimson harateen hangings has been reconstructed, using a period bed; the woven wool fabric and silk braid for the upholstery and curtains were prepared based on a full tester bed at Hanbury Hall, Worcestershire. The bed linen, pillows and quilt mentioned in the inventory have been recreated using items from the Historic Royal Palaces.

== Permanent collection ==
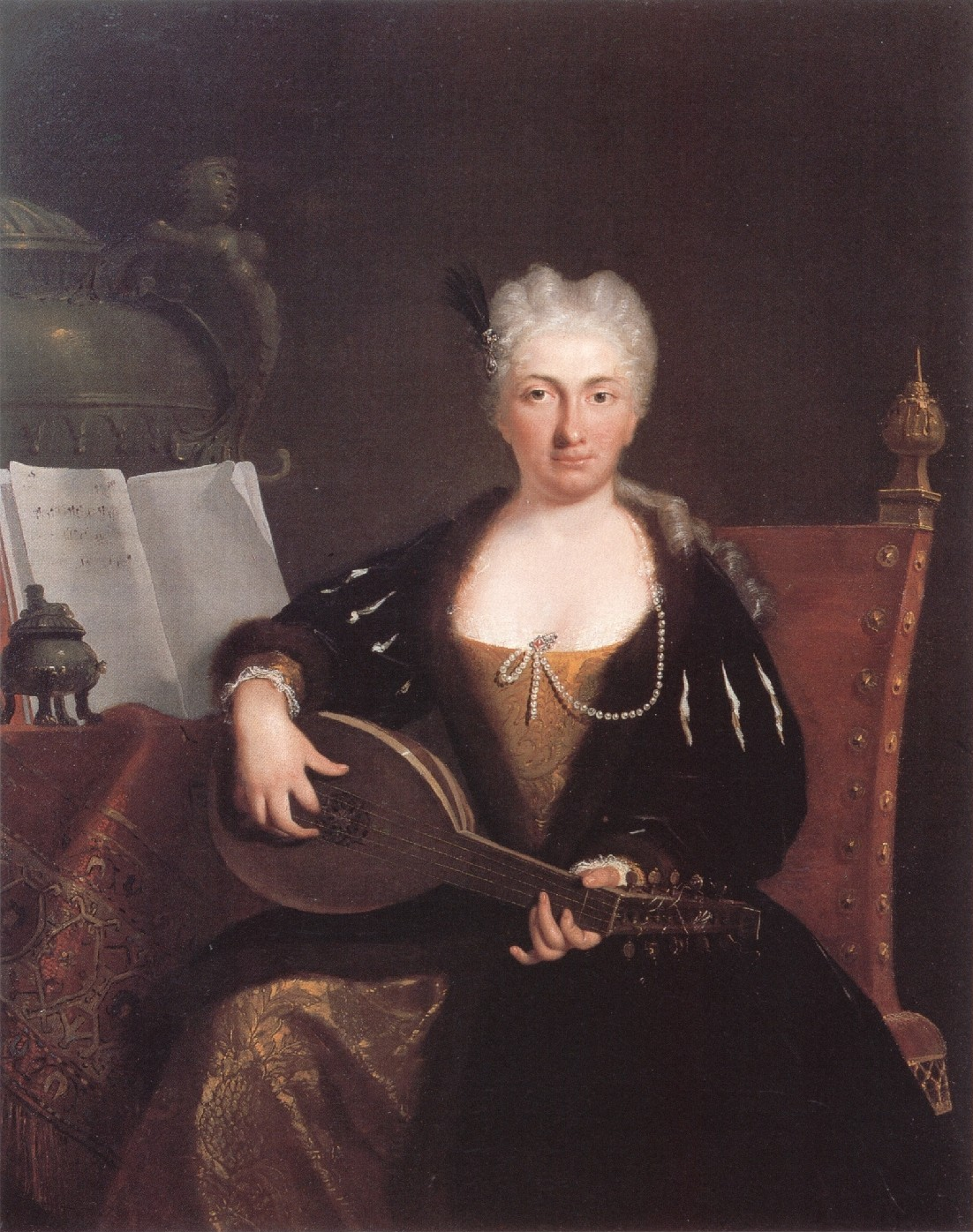
Faustina Bordoni, by Bartolomeo Nazari

In 1998 the Handel House Collections Trust acquired the Byrne Collection, a large collection of several hundred objects connected with Handel. These include:

- correspondence of Handel,
- original manuscripts,
- a copy of one of the first biographies of Handel by John Mainwaring, with marginal comments by his friend and librettist Charles Jennens,
- early editions of operas and oratorios
- prints,
- paintings
- sculptures.

Around the same time the trust also bought two paintings of Jennens (by Thomas Hudson) and the opera singer Faustina Bordoni (by Bartolomeo Nazari).

== 25 Brook Street ==
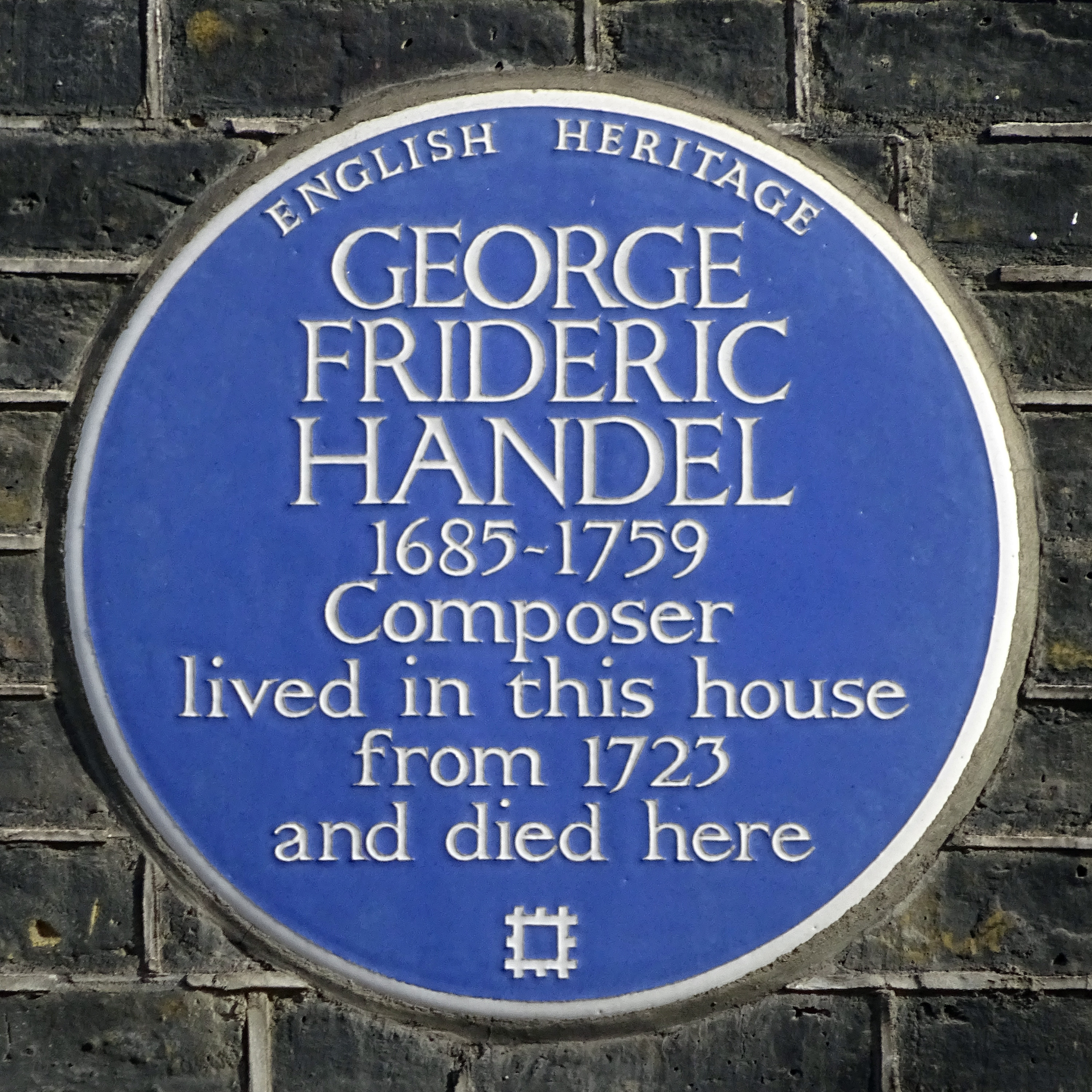
The blue plaque to George Frideric Handel

In 2022 it was reported that Handel & Hendrix in London had embarked on a £3 million project to open all of Handel's house to the public for the first time.

The following rooms have been open to the public.

=== Rehearsal and performance room ===
On the first floor at the front of the house, this was used as a rehearsal room by Handel from the 1730s onwards. It contains portraits of contemporary singers and a reproduction of a two manual harpsichord by the Flemish firm Ruckers. The harpsichord is used for concerts and is also available for rehearsals by musicians from the general public.

=== Composition room ===
On the first floor at the back of the house, this is believed to be the room in which Handel composed some of his most celebrated works, including Messiah. It contains portraits of Handel and Charles Jennens, Handel's friend and librettist of Messiah.

=== London room ===
On the second floor at the rear of the house, this served as Handel's dressing room and was originally connected to a small closet.

=== Bedroom ===
On the second floor at the front of the house, this is probably the room where Handel died. A complete inventory was made within months of his death. Amongst the furniture, it describes a large canopied tester bed similar to the one now in the room.

== 23 Brook Street ==
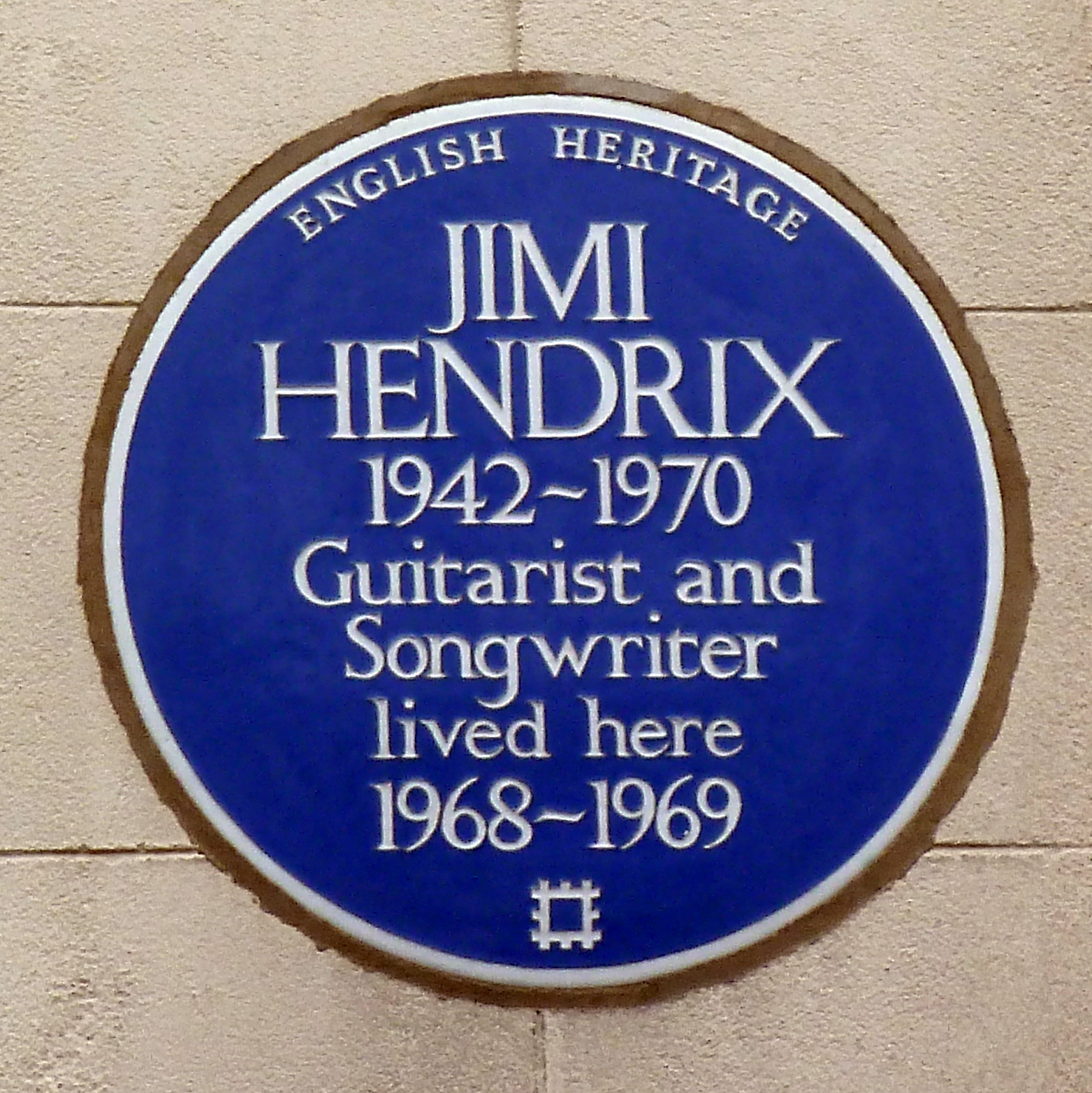
The blue plaque to Jimi Hendrix

The museum incorporates the upper floors of its neighbour at 23 Brook Street, which was the home of the American rock singer-guitarist Jimi Hendrix in 1968–1969. These rooms were used for temporary exhibitions and events, but after fundraising, these and the rest of the rooms from the Hendrix apartment were opened to the public in February 2016 as "Handel and Hendrix in London". One exhibit permanently on display here is a collection of Hendrix's old records. Both houses have blue plaques for their respective occupants.

== Opening hours and events ==
The house is open to the public five days a week, Wednesday to Sunday. The museum has a lively events programme including live music, changing exhibitions, lectures and children's educational events. Several performances of Baroque music are staged each month; recitals are sometimes during opening hours, but more usually in the early evening for a separate charge.

== See also ==
- List of music museums
- Will of George Frideric Handel

== Bibliography ==
- Riding, Jacqueline; Burrows, Donald; Hicks, Anthony (2001). Handel House Museum Companion. University of California: Handel House Trust. ISBN 0-9541670-0-7.
- Schoelcher, Victor (1857). Life of Handel. Translated by J. Lowe (2nd ed.). University of Oxford: Tiger of the Stripe. ISBN 1-904799-38-8.
- Brauchli, Bernard (1998). The Clavichord. Cambridge, UK: Cambridge University Press. ISBN 0-521-63067-3.
- Van Til, Maria (2007). George Frideric Handel: A Music Lover's Guide to His Life, His Faith & the Development of Messiah and His Other Oratorios. Youngstown, NY: WordPower Publishing. ISBN 978-0-9794785-0-5.
- Vickers, David (2001). "London Sings Hallelujah: A report from the long-awaited Handel House Museum" (PDF). Andante. Archived from the original (PDF) on 30 May 2013.
