= Donald Burrows =

Donald Burrows may refer to:

- Don Burrows (1928–2020), Australian jazz musician
- Donald Burrows (musicologist) (born 1945), Handel scholar and professor of music at the Open University

== See also ==
- Don Burroughs (1931–2006), American football player
