= Art collection of George Frideric Handel =

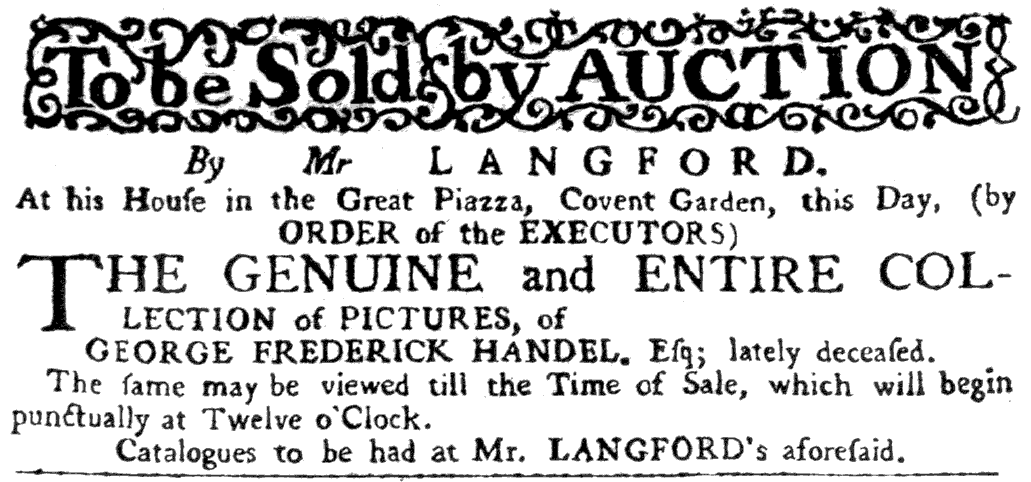
Auction Notice (Daily Advertiser, 28 February 1760) for the sale of Handel's art collection

George Frideric Handel is reported to have had a great love for painting, and until his eyesight failed him, he enjoyed viewing collections of pictures that were for sale. He owned a large art collection consisting of at least seventy paintings and ten prints, including landscapes; ruins; hunting, historical, marine and battle scenes; erotica; and a few Biblical paintings and portraits.

== Artworks ==
The paintings and prints in Handel's collection (that weren't bequeathed in his will) were auctioned by Abraham Langford a little over ten months after his death (the auction catalogue was dated 27–28 February 1760).

=== Auction ===
The auction of Handel's art collection occurred on 28 February 1760. The sale catalogue listed the following items:

Lot	Genre	Artist	Notes
1	Print	Dorigny, N.	Eight of the planets
2	Print	Solimene	The flight into Egypt, and 8 others
3	Print	Dorigny, N.	Seven prints of the Angels and Crucifixion
4	Print	Poussin, N.	Eight landscapes
5	Print	Lambert and Scott	Six sea pieces
6	Print	Goupy	Four landscapes (after Poussin, etc.)
7	Print	Dorigny, N.	Four views of Malta, and 3 others
8	Print	Goupy	Eight landscapes (after Sal. Rosa)
9	Print	Goupy	Rubens stag-hunting, and 5 others
10	Map	—	Eight maps on rollers
11	Frame	—	Two burnished gold frames
12	Painting	Unknown	Two door pieces (after Servandoni), and 2 others
13	Painting	Vandiest	A landscape with buildings
13	Painting	Mompert	A small landscape
13	Painting	Percelles	A sea piece
14	Painting	Unknown	A Dutch conversation (in the style of Ostade)
14	Painting	Unknown	A landscape (in the style of Housman)
14	Painting	Unknown	Two portraits
15	Painting	Pellegrini	Two history pieces
16	Painting	Ardine	Two flower pieces
16	Painting	Montingo	One flower piece
17	Painting	Percelles	A fresh gale
17	Painting	Unknown	A calm
17	Painting	Unknown	Two others
18	Painting	van Bassen, Ab.	A Town on Fire
18	Painting	Vandiest	A Landscape
18	Painting	Vandiest	Two heads in one picture
19	Painting	Teniers, D.	A conversation of Boors
20	Painting	Angeles	Two monkeys in friars habits
20	Painting	Vangoen	A small landscape
21	Painting	Mola, Fr.	Narcissus in a landscape
21	Painting	Unknown	A man playing on a German flute (in the style of Titian)
22	Painting	Ardine	A flower piece
22	Painting	Unknown	A landscape
23	Painting	Unknown	Two landscapes
24	Painting	Griffier, Jan ("Old")	A landscape and cattle (after Berghem)
24	Painting	Ruysdael, Sol.	A landscape and cattle
25	Painting	Servandoni	A piece of ruins
26	Painting	Pellegrini	Sampson and Dalilah
27	Painting	Unknown	A head (in the style of Rembrandt)
28	Painting	Watteau	A conversation
29	Painting	Watteau	Companion to "A conversation"
30	Painting	Unknown	Jupiter and Leda (in water colours)
31	Painting	Unknown	Jupiter and Danaë (Companion to "Juptier and Leda")
32	Painting	Mompert	A landscape
33	Painting	Andrea, S.	A lamp-light
34	Painting	Unknown	The Rape of Proserpine
35	Painting	Goupy	Hagar and Ishmael
36	Painting	Parrocelle	A landscape with a bridge
36	Painting	Parrocelle	The finding of Moses
37	Painting	Cantarini	Two Angels heads in an oval, and its companion
38	Painting	Swanevelt	A landscape
39	Painting	Wooton	A sun-set
40	Painting	Poussin, N.	A landscape
41	Painting	Horizonti	An upright landscape
42	Painting	Horizonti	Companion to "An upright landscape"
43	Painting	Goupy	Belisarius (after van Dyck), in water colours
44	Painting	Michau	An upright landscape
45	Painting	Hondius	An upright landscape with Vulcan's forge
46	Painting	Savory, Rowland	A landscape (Roelant Savery?)
47	Painting	Unknown	Jupiter and Iö, in water colours
48	Painting	Unknown	Jupiter and Ixion (companion to Jupiter and Iö)
49	Painting	Hondius	A hunting piece
50	Painting	Horizonti	A landscape
51	Painting	Ricci, M.	A landscape and buildings, in water colours
52	Painting	Ricci, M.	A landscape and buildings
53	Painting	Ricci, M.	A landscape and buildings (small)
54	Painting	Unknown	A large piece of architecture and tuins (after Panini)
55	Painting	Poussin, N.	The siege of Troy
56	Painting	Tillemans	Two battle pieces
57	Painting	Brueghell?	A small landscape
58	Painting	Goupy	Mucius Scaevola
59	Painting	Andrea del Sarto	Venus with her Attendants
60	Painting	Ferg	A landscape and figures, on copper
61	Painting	Ferg	Companion to "A landscape and figures"
62	Painting	Lucatelli	A landscape
63	Painting	Cannaletti	The Doge's palace
64	Painting	Poelenburgh	Bacchus and Ariadne
65	Painting	Ricci, Seb.	Venus and Adonis
66	Painting	Capriacci	Venus and Cupid (in an oval)
67	Painting	Servandoni	A large piece of ruins and figures
