= Marienbibliothek, Halle (Saale) =

Church library in Saxony-Anhalt, Germany

- Marienbibliothek zu Halle an der Saale
- Ex Libris of the Marienbibliothek
- 51°28′56″N 11°58′6″E
- Location: Halle (Saale)
- Type: Scientific library
- Established: 1552

Collection
- Items collected: 36,000 volumes

Other information
- Director: Anke Fiebiger
- Administrator: Hallesche Marktkirchengemeinde
- Website: www.marienbibliothek-halle.de

The Marienbibliothek (St. Mary's Library) in Halle (Saale), Germany, is a library founded in 1552.

It is a church library, the oldest and largest in Germany. The library's collections include many hymnals from the 1500s and 1600s.
