= Donald Burrows (musicologist) =

British musicologist (born 1945)

Donald James Burrows (born 28 December 1945, in London) is a musicologist and a leading scholar of the music of George Frideric Handel. Until his retirement, he was professor of music at the Open University.

He read history and music at Trinity Hall, Cambridge (BA 1968; PGCE 1969; MA 1971). He completed his PhD at the Open University in 1981. He is vice-president of the Händel-Gesellschaft, and chairman of the Handel Institute.

== Awards ==
- 2000 Handel Prize

== Works ==
- Donald Burrows (2000). "Reading the Metre: Verse Forms in Oratorio Librettos written for Handel by Charles Jennens and Thomas Morell". In David Greer (ed.). Musicology and Sister Disciplines (proceedings of the 16th International Congress, London, 1997). International Musicological Society, Oxford University Press. p. 622. ISBN 978-0-19-816734-1.
- Donald Burrows, ed. (1997). The Cambridge Companion to Handel. Cambridge Companions to Music. Cambridge University Press. ISBN 978-0-521-45613-5.
- Donald Burrows (2005). Handel and the English Chapel Royal. Oxford University Press. ISBN 978-0-19-816228-5.
