= List of compositions by George Frideric Handel =

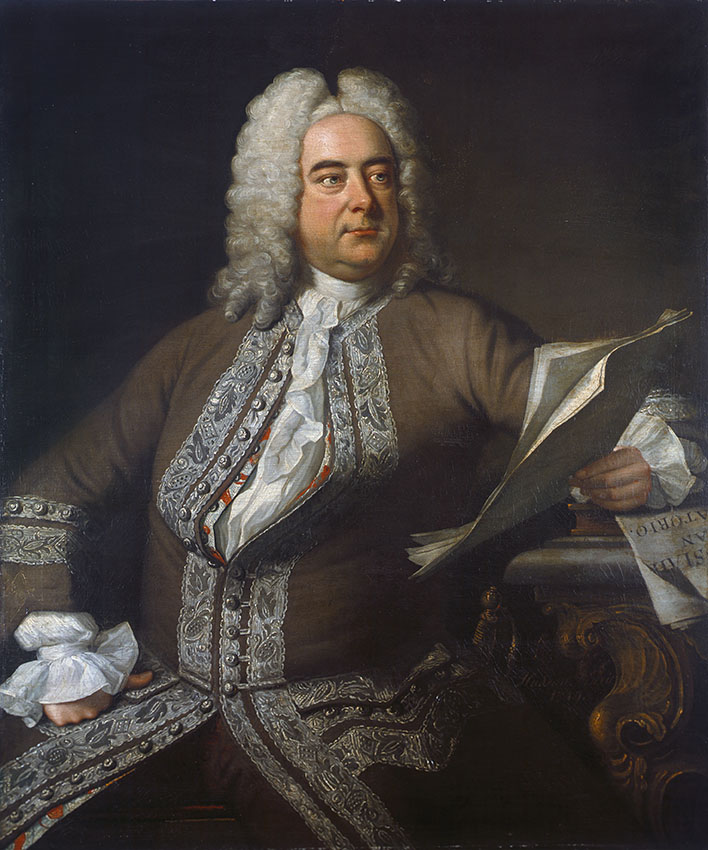
Portrait of Handel by Thomas Hudson

George Frideric Handel (23 February 1685 – 14 April 1759) composed works including 42 operas; 24 oratorios; more than 120 cantatas, trios and duets; numerous arias; odes and serenatas; solo and trio sonatas; 18 concerti grossi; and 12 organ concertos.

Collected editions of Handel's works include the Händel-Gesellschaft (HG) and the Hallische Händel-Ausgabe (HHA), but the more recent Händel-Werke-Verzeichnis (HWV) publication is now commonly used to number his works. For example, Handel's Messiah can be referred to as: HG xlv, HHA i/17, or HWV 56. Some of Handel's music is also numbered based on initial publications, for example a 1741 publication by Walsh labelled twelve of Handel's concerti grossi as Opus 6.

== Operas ==
List of operas by George Frideric Handel. All works are opera seria in three acts, unless otherwise stated.
HWV	Title	Premiere	Venue	Libretto	Notes
1	Almira	8 January 1705	Oper am Gänsemarkt, Hamburg	Friedrich Christian Feustking, after G. Pancieri	Singspiel
2	Nero	25 February 1705	Oper am Gänsemarkt, Hamburg	Friedrich Christian Feustking	Music lost
3	Florindo	January 1708	Oper am Gänsemarkt, Hamburg	Hinrich Hinsch	Only a copy of the libretto, Suite, and 1 aria preserved
4	Daphne	January 1708	Oper am Gänsemarkt, Hamburg	Hinrich Hinsch	Suite, 1 chorus, and 1 aria preserved
5	Rodrigo	Autumn 1707	Teatro di via del Cocomero, Florence	after F. Salvani	
6	Agrippina	26 December 1709	Teatro San Giovanni Grisostomo, Venice	Vincenzo Grimani	
7a/b	Rinaldo	24 February 1711	Queen's Theatre, London	Giacomo Rossi, after Aaron Hill, after Torquato Tasso, La Gerusalemme liberata	
8a/b/c	Il pastor fido	22 November 1712	Queen's Theatre, London	Giacomo Rossi, after Guarini	The 1712 version is 8a. The 1734 revised versions are designated 8c. The prologue Terpsicore added to the final version is 8b.
9	Teseo	10 January 1713	Queen's Theatre, London	Nicola Francesco Haym, after Philippe Quinault	5 acts
10	Silla	2 June 1713?	Queen's Theatre? (or Burlington House?), London	Giacomo Rossi, after Plutarch	Music reused in Amadigi
11	Amadigi di Gaula	25 May 1715	King's Theatre, London	Rossi or Haym (?), after A.H. de la Motte, 1699	
12a/b	Radamisto	27 April 1720	King’s Theatre, London	Haym (?), after D. Lalli	
13	Muzio Scevola	15 April 1721	King’s Theatre, London	Paolo Antonio Rolli, after Silvio Stampiglia	only Act 3 by Handel
14	Floridante	9 December 1721	King’s Theatre, London	Rolli, after Francesco Silvani La costanza in trionfo	
15	Ottone	12 January 1723	King’s Theatre, London	Haym, after S. B. Pallavicino	
16	Flavio	14 May 1723	King’s Theatre, London	Haym, after M Norris	
17	Giulio Cesare	20 February 1724	King’s Theatre, London	Haym	
18	Tamerlano	31 October 1724	King’s Theatre, London	Haym, after Agostin Piovene and Nicholas Pradon	
19	Rodelinda	13 February 1725	King’s Theatre, London	Haym, after Antonio Salvi, after Pierre Corneille	
20	Scipione	12 March 1726	King’s Theatre, London	Rolli	
21	Alessandro	5 May 1726	King’s Theatre, London	Rolli, after Ortensio Mauro	
22	Admeto	31 January 1727	King’s Theatre, London	Haym	
23	Riccardo Primo	11 November 1727	King’s Theatre, London	Rolli, after Francesco Briani	
A^{2}	Genserico (or Olibrio)			After N. Beregan	Drafted early 1728. Only part of Act I. Music mostly used in Siroe and Tolomeo.
24	Siroe	17 February 1728	King’s Theatre, London	Haym, after Metastasio	
25	Tolomeo	30 April 1728	King’s Theatre, London	Haym, adapted from Carlo Sigismondo Capece	
26	Lotario	2 December 1729	King’s Theatre, London	After Antonio Salvi	
27	Partenope	24 February 1730	King’s Theatre, London	After Silvio Stampiglia	
28	Poro	2 February 1731	King’s Theatre, London	After Metastasio	
A^{5}	Titus l'Empereur			After J. Racine: Bérénice	Only one act (first three scenes) with some music used in Ezio. Composed late 1731.
29	Ezio	15 January 1732	King’s Theatre, London	Metastasio	
30a	Fernando, Re di Castiglia				A reconstruction of Handel's 1st draft of HWV 30b
30b	Sosarme	15 February 1732	King’s Theatre, London	After Salvi	
31	Orlando	27 January 1733	King’s Theatre, London	After Capece, after Ludovico Ariosto's Orlando furioso	
32	Arianna in Creta	26 January 1734	King’s Theatre, London	After Pietro Pariati	
A^{11}	Oreste	18 December 1734	Covent Garden Theatre, London	Adapted from G.G. Barlocci	Pasticcio, composed in 1734. Music entirely by Handel. Overture published in HG volume 48 (p. 102).
33	Ariodante	8 January 1735	Covent Garden Theatre, London	After Salvi, after Ariosto's Orlando Furioso	
34	Alcina	16 April 1735	Covent Garden Theatre, London	After Ariosto's Orlando Furioso	
35	Atalanta	12 May 1736	Covent Garden Theatre, London	After Belisario Valeriani	
36	Arminio	12 January 1737	Covent Garden Theatre, London	After Salvi	
37	Giustino	16 February 1737	Covent Garden Theatre, London	Adapted from Pariati's Giustino, after Nicolo Beregan's Il Giustino	
38	Berenice	18 May 1737	Covent Garden Theatre, London	After Salvi	
39	Faramondo	3 January 1738	King’s Theatre, London	Adapted from Apostolo Zeno's Faramondo	
A^{13}	Alessandro Severo	25 February 1738	King’s Theatre, London	Adapted from Zeno	Pasticcio, composed in 1738. Music entirely by Handel. Overture published in HG volume 48 (p. 104).
40	Serse (Xerxes)	15 April 1738	King’s Theatre, London	After Stampiglia	
A^{14}	Giove in Argo	1 May 1739	King’s Theatre, London	Adapted from A.M. Lucchini	Pasticcio, composed in April 1739. Music entirely by Handel. Semi-staged.
41	Imeneo	22 November 1740	Theatre in Lincoln's Inn Fields, London	After Stampiglia's Imeneo	
42	Deidamia	10 January 1741	Theatre in Lincoln's Inn Fields, London	Rolli	

== Incidental music ==
List of incidental music by George Frideric Handel
HWV	Title	Premiere	Venue	Notes
43	The Alchemist	14 January 1710	Queen's Theatre, London	Instrumental music for the revival of Ben Jonson's play The Alchemist. An arrangement, by an anonymous composer, of music from Handel's opera Rodrigo.
44	Comus	June 1745	Ludlow Castle, Shropshire	Three songs and a trio written as part of a private arrangement of John Milton's masque Comus.
45	Alceste	Not performed		A masque which was written for an unproduced play by Tobias Smollett. Music composed between December 1749 and January 1750.
218	Love's but the frailty of the mind	17 March 1740	Drury Lane Theatre, London	Sung by Mrs. Kitty Clive at her benefit performance of William Congreve's The Way of the World (Act III). Music composed in London, 1740

== Oratorios ==
List of oratorios by George Frideric Handel
HWV	Title	Premiere	Venue	Libretto	Text	Notes
46a	Il trionfo del Tempo e del Disinganno	June 1707	Rome	Benedetto Pamphili		
46b	Il trionfo del Tempo e della Verità	23 March 1737	London	Benedetto Pamphili		
47	La resurrezione	8 April 1708	Rome	Carlo Sigismondo Capece		
48	Brockes Passion	23 March or 3 April 1719	Hamburg Cathedral (possibly)	Barthold Heinrich Brockes		
50a	Esther	?1718	probably Cannons	John Arbuthnot	IMSLP. Based on Alexander Pope's work.	Originally a masque.
50b	Esther	1 May 1732	King's Theatre, London	John Arbuthnot	IMSLP. Based on Alexander Pope's work.	Contains additions by S. Humphreys
51	Deborah	21 February 1733	King's Theatre, London	Samuel Humphreys	Stanford	
52	Athalia	10 July 1733	Sheldonian Theatre, Oxford	Samuel Humphreys	Stanford	
53	Saul	16 January 1739	King's Theatre, London	Charles Jennens	Stanford	
54	Israel in Egypt	4 April 1739	King's Theatre, London	Charles Jennens?	Stanford	
55	L'Allegro, il Penseroso ed il Moderato	27 February 1740	Theatre in Lincoln's Inn Fields, London	Charles Jennens	Stanford. Based on John Milton's work.	
56	Messiah	13 April 1742	New Music Hall, Dublin	Charles Jennens	Stanford	
57	Samson	18 February 1743	Covent Garden Theatre, London	Newburgh Hamilton	Stanford	
58	Semele	10 February 1744	Covent Garden Theatre, London	William Congreve	Stanford	An opera catalogued as an oratorio
59	Joseph and his Brethren	2 March 1744	Covent Garden Theatre, London	James Miller	Stanford	
60	Hercules	5 January 1745	King's Theatre, London	Thomas Broughton	Stanford	
61	Belshazzar	27 March 1745	King's Theatre, London	Charles Jennens	Stanford	
62	Occasional Oratorio	14 February 1746	Covent Garden Theatre, London	Newburgh Hamilton	Stanford	
63	Judas Maccabaeus	1 April 1747	Covent Garden Theatre, London	Thomas Morell	Stanford	
64	Joshua	9 March 1748	Covent Garden Theatre, London	Thomas Morell	Stanford	
65	Alexander Balus	23 March 1748	Covent Garden Theatre, London	Thomas Morell	Stanford	
66	Susanna	10 February 1749	Covent Garden Theatre, London	Newburgh Hamilton?	Stanford	
67	Solomon	17 March 1749	Covent Garden Theatre, London	Newburgh Hamilton?	Stanford	
68	Theodora	16 March 1750	Covent Garden Theatre, London	Thomas Morell	Stanford	
69	The Choice of Hercules	1 March 1751	Covent Garden Theatre, London	Thomas Morell?	Stanford	
70	Jephtha	26 February 1752	Covent Garden Theatre, London	Thomas Morell	Stanford	
71	The Triumph of Time and Truth	11 March 1757	Covent Garden Theatre, London	Thomas Morell?	Stanford	

== Odes and masques ==
HWV	Title	Premiere	Venue	Text
49a	Acis and Galatea (masque)	probably 1718	Cannons, near London	
49b	Acis and Galatea (serenata)	10 June 1732	King's Theatre, London	Stanford
72	Aci, Galatea e Polifemo	19 July 1708	Naples	
73	Parnasso in Festa	13 March 1734	King's Theatre, London	
74	Ode for the Birthday of Queen Anne	6 February 1713	Royal Palace in London	
75	Alexander's Feast	19 February 1736	King's Theatre, London	Stanford
76	Ode for St. Cecilia's Day	22 November 1739	Theatre in Lincoln's Inn Fields, London	Stanford

== Cantatas ==
List of cantatas by George Frideric Handel
HWV	Title	Composed	Premiere	Venue	Notes	Text
77	Ah che pur troppo è vero	Florence, c. 1707				
78	Ah! crudel, nel pianto mio	Rome, August 1708	2 September 1708	Palazzo Bonelli, Rome		
79	Diana cacciatrice or Alla caccia	Rome, May 1707	May – June 1707	Vignanello	Copied for Francesco Ruspoli, 1707	
80	Allor ch'io dissi addio	Rome, 1707–08				
81	Alpestre monte	Florence, c. 1707				
82	Amarilli vezzosa or Daliso ed Amarilli or Il duello amoroso	Rome, August 1708	Probably 28 October 1708		Copied for Ruspoli, 1708	
83	Aminta e Fillide or Arresta il passo	Early 1708	14 July 1708	Rome	Copied for Ruspoli, 1708. The section, "Chi ben ama" printed separately in HG 52b	
84	Aure soavi e lieti	Rome, May 1707			Copied for Ruspoli, 1707	
85	Venus and Adonis or Behold where weeping Venus stands	London, c. 1711			No autograph, authenticity uncertain	
86	Bella ma ritrosetta	London, c. 1717–18				
87	Carco sempre di gloria	London, 1737	16 March 1737	London	Variant insertion in "Cecilia, volgi un sguardo" (89), for performances of Alexander's Feast (HWV 75), 1737, including music for the castrato Domenico Annibali	
88	Care selve, aure grate	Rome, 1707–08				
89	Cecilia, volgi un sguardo	London, January 1736	19 or 25 (?) February 1736	Covent Garden Theatre, London	Played between the two parts of Alexander's Feast (HWV 75).	
90	Chi rapì la pace al core	Florence, c. 1706–07			Copied for Ruspoli, 1709	
91a	Clori, degli occhi miei	Florence, late 1707				
91b	Clori, degli occhi miei	London, after 1710				
92	Clori, mia bella Clori	Rome, 1707–08				
93	Clori, ove sei?	Italy, 1707–08				
94	Clori, si, ch'io t'adoro				No autograph, earliest source c. 1738–40	
95	Clori, vezzosa Clori	Rome, July/August 1708			Copied for Ruspoli, 1708	
96	Clori, Tirsi e Fileno or Cor fedele in vano speri	Rome, July/September 1707			Copied for Ruspoli, 14 October 1707.	
97	Crudel tiranno Amor	London, June 1721	Probably 5 July 1721	King's Theatre, Haymarket, London	Performed at the benefit concert for Margherita Durastanti.	
98	Cuopre tal volta il cielo	Italy, 1708				
99	Il delirio amoroso or Da quel giorno fatale	Rome, on or before 14 January 1707.	May 1707	Cardinal Pamphili's palazzo		
100	Da sete ardente afflitto	Italy, 1708–09			Copied for Ruspoli, 1709. (HWV 101a & 101b: Dal fatale momento. Spurious, by F. Mancini).	
102a	Dalla guerra amorosa	Italy, 1708–09			Version for bass. Copied for Ruspoli, 1709	
102b	Dalla guerra amorosa	Italy, 1708–09			Version for soprano. Copied for Ruspoli, 1709	
103	Deh! lasciate e vita e volo	London, c. 1722–25				Libretto text by Paolo Antonio Rolli
104	Del bell'idolo mio	Rome, 1707–09			Copied for Ruspoli in 1709, but possibly written as early as 1707.	
105	Armida abbandonata or Dietro l'orme fuggaci	Rome, June 1707	Possibly 26 June 1707	Palazzo Bonelli, Rome	Copied for Ruspoli, 1707, 1709.	
106	Dimmi, o mio cor	Italy, 1707–09			See note for HWV 132	
107	Ditemi, o piante	Rome, July/August 1708			Copied for Ruspoli, 1708	
108	Dolce mio ben, s'io taccio				No autograph. No source attributed to Handel.	
109a	Dolc'è pur d'amor l'affanno	London, c. 1717–18				Libretto ?Text by Paolo Antonio Rolli
109b	Dolc'è pur d'amor l'affanno	London, ?after 1718				Libretto: ?Text by Paolo Antonio Rolli
110	Agrippina condotta a morire or Dunque sarà pur vero	Italy, 1707–08	Early in 1708		First performed by the castrato soprano, Pasqualino Tiepoli	Libretto: Anonymous
111a	E partirai, mia vita?	Italy, 1707–09				
111b	E partirai, mia vita?	London, c. 1725–28				
112	Figli del mesto cor	Probably Italy, 1707–09			No autograph or Italian-period copies	
113	Figlio d'alte speranze	Florence, 1706–07				
114	Filli adorata e cara	Rome, 1707–08			Copied for Ruspoli, 1709	
115	Fra pensieri quel pensiero	Italy, 1707–08				
116	Fra tante pene	Florence, 1706–07			Copied for Ruspoli, 1709	
117	Hendel, non può mia musa	July/August 1708			Copied for Ruspoli, 1708, 1709	Libretto by Cardinal Benedetto Pamphili
118	Ho fuggito Amore anch'io	London, c. 1722–23			Printed without final aria in HG.	Libretto by Paolo Antonio Rolli
119	Echeggiate, festeggiate, numi eterni or Io languisco fra le gioie	London, c. 1710–12			Partly lost. Fragments printed in wrong order in HG.	
120a	Irene, idolo mio	Italy, 1707–09			No autographs or Italian-period copies.	
120b	Irene, idolo mio	England, after 1710			No autographs or Italian-period copies.	
121a	La Solitudine or L'aure grate, il fresco rio	London, c. 1722–23			fragment	
121b	La Solitudine or L'aure grate, il fresco rio	London, before 1718				
122	Apollo e Dafne or La terra è liberata	Hanover, 1710			Probably begun Venice, 1709	
123	Languia di bocca lusinghiera	Possibly composed in Hanover, 1710			?fragment	
124	Look down, harmonious saint	c. 1736	February 1736	Covent Garden Theatre, London	Recitative and aria; probably a discarded fragment for "Alexander's Feast" (HWV 75), 1736. It appeared in the cantata HWV 89	Libretto by Newburgh Hamilton, from Cecilian Ode 1720.
125a	Lungi da me, pensier tiranno	Italy, July – September 1708			1st version; no autographs or Italian-period copies; one version copied for Francesco Ruspoli, 1708.	
125b	Lungi da me, pensier tiranno	London, after 1710			Second version; no autographs.	
126a	Lungi da voi, che siete poli	Rome, July/August 1708				
126b	Lungi da voi, che siete poli	Rome, 1708				
126c	Lungi da voi, che siete poli	Probably London, after 1710.				
127a	Lungi dal mio bel nume	Rome, 3 March 1708				
127b	Lungi dal mio bel nume	?London, after 1710				
127c	Lungi dal mio bel nume	London, c. 1725–28				
128	Lungi n'andò Fileno	Rome, August 1708			Copied for Ruspoli, 1708	
129	Manca pur quanto sai	Rome, July/August 1708			Copied for Ruspoli, 1708	
130	Mentre il tutto è in furore	Rome, August 1708			Copied for Ruspoli, 1708	
131	Menzognere speranze	Rome, September 1707			Copied for Ruspoli, 1707	
132a	Mi palpita il cor	?London, after 1710			Borrowings: Version of "Dimmi, o mio cor" (HWV 106) with new opening.	
132b	Mi palpita il cor	?London, after 1718				
132c	Mi palpita il cor	?London, after 1710				
132d	Mi palpita il cor	?London, c. 1711–12				
133	Ne' tuoi lumi, o bella Clori	Rome, September 1707			Copied for Ruspoli, 1707, 1709	
134	Pensieri notturni di Filli or Nel dolce dell'oblio	Rome, 1707–08. Completed 1709				
135a	Nel dolce tempo	Probably Naples, June/July 1708				
135b	Nel dolce tempo	London, after 1710			No autographs, and no early Italian-period copies.	
136a	Nell'Africane selve	Naples, June/July 1708				
136b	Nell'Africane selve	London, after 1710				
137	Nella stagion che di viole e rose	Rome, April/May 1707			Copied for Ruspoli, 1707, 1709. Probably composed for the soprano, Margherita Durastanti.	
138	Nice, che fa? che pensa?	?Hanover, 1710				
139a	Ninfe e pastori	Rome, 1707–09			Copied for Ruspoli, 1709	
139b	Ninfe e pastori	Probably London, after 1710				
139c	Ninfe e pastori	London, c. 1725–28				
140	Nò se emenderá jamás	Rome, September 1707			Copied for Ruspoli, 1707	
141	Non sospirar, non piangere	Florence, Fall 1707				
142	Notte placida e cheta	Rome, 1707–08				Libretto anonymous
143	Olinto pastore, Tebro fiume, Gloria or O come chiare e belle	Rome, August/September 1708	9 September 1708	Marquis Ruspoli's Palazzo Bonelli	?Copied for Ruspoli, 1708. First performed by the soprano Anna Marie di Piedz	
144	O lucenti, o sereni occhi	Rome, 1707				
145	Lucrezia (O numi eterni)	August 1708			Copied for Ruspoli, 1709. Probably composed for the soprano Margherita Durastanti.	Libretto by Cardinal Benedetto Pamphili
146	Occhi miei che faceste?	Rome, 1707–08			Copied for Ruspoli, 1709	
147	Partì, l'idolo mio	London, after 1710			No autograph or early Italian copies.	
148	Poichè giuraro amore	Rome, early 1707			Copied for Ruspoli, 1707, 1709	
149	Qual sento io non conosciuto				Only source c. 1738–40	
150	Ero e Leandro or Qual ti riveggio, oh Dio	Rome, 1707			Derived from the story of Hero and Leander	Libretto ?Cardinal Pietro Ottoboni.
151	Qualor crudele, sì ma vaga Dori	London, after 1710			No autograph or early Italian-period copies	
152	Qualor l'egre pupille	Rome, September 1707			Copied for Ruspoli, 1707	
153	Quando sperasti, o core	Probably Naples, June/July 1708			Copied for Ruspoli, 1708	
154	Quel fior che all'alba ride	London, c. 1738–40			Published in Handel (ed. Burrows), "Songs and Cantatas for Soprano."	
155	Sans y penser	Rome, September 1707			Composed in Italy. Copied for Ruspoli, 1707, 1709.	
156	Sarai contenta un di	Florence, 1706–07				
157	Sarei troppo felice	Rome, September 1707			Copied for Ruspoli, 1707, 1708 (incomplete)	Libretto by B. Pamphili.
158a	Se pari è la tua fè	Rome, 1708			Copied for Ruspoli, 1708, 1709.	
158b	Se pari è la tua fè	Probably London, after 1710				
158c	Se pari è la tua fè	London, c. 1725–28				
159	Se per fatal destino	Rome, early 1707			Copied for Ruspoli, 1707, 1709	
160a	La bianca rosa or Sei pur bella, pur vezzosa	Rome, early 1707			Copied for Ruspoli, 1707, 1709	
160b	La bianca rosa or Sei pur bella, pur vezzosa	London, c. 1725–28				
160c	La bianca rosa or Sei pur bella, pur vezzosa	London, c. 1738–41				
161a	Sento là che ristretto	Rome, 1708–09				
161b	Sento là che ristretto					
161c	Sento là che ristretto	London, c. 1725–28				
162	Siete rose ruggiadose	London, c. 1711–12.			Composed with variant	
163	Solitudini care, amata libertà	London, after 1710			No autographs or early Italian-period copies	
164a	Il Gelsomino or Son Gelsomino	London, c. 1725–28				
164b	Il Gelsomino or Son Gelsomino	London, c. 1717–18				
165	Spande ancor a mio dispetto	Italy, 1707–08				
166	Splenda l'alba in oriente	London, c. 1711–12			Survives only in fragmentary form.	
167a	Stanco di più soffrire	Italy, 1707–08				
167b	Stanco di più soffrire	Rome, July/August 1708				
168	Partenza di G. B. or Stelle, perfide stelle	Rome, 1707				
169	Torna il core al suo diletto	Probably Rome, 1707–08				
170	Tra le fiamme (Il consiglio)	Rome, 1707				Libretto by Cardinal Benedetto Pamphili
171	Tu fedel? Tu costante?	Florence/Rome, 1706–07			Copied for Ruspoli, 1707, 1708	
172	Udite il mio consiglio	Florence, 1706–07			Copied for Ruspoli, 1707	
173	Un'alma innamorata	Rome, May 1707	June 1707	Probably Vignanello	Copied for Ruspoli, 1707	
174	Un sospir a chi si muore	Florence, Fall 1707				
175	Vedendo Amor	Rome, 1707–08				
176	Amore uccellatore or Venne voglia ad Amore	Rome, 1707–08				
177	Zeffiretto, arresta il volo	Italy, 1707–09			?Copied for Ruspoli, 1709	

== Italian duets ==
HWV	Title	Composed	Notes	Text
178	A mirarvi io son intento	?Hanover, c. 1711	First movement reappeared 2 years later in the Utrecht Jubilate (HWV 279) as "Be ye sure that Lord he is God.". Slow middle section formed the basis for the final chorus of "Alcina" (HWV 34) in 1735.	
179	Ahi, nelle sorti umane	London, 31 August 1745		
180	Amor, gioje mi porge	Italy, c. 1707–09		
181	Beato in ver chi può	London, 31 October 1742	Italian version of Horace, "Beatus ille"	
182a	Caro autor di mia doglia	Probably Italy, c. 1707–09		
182b	Caro autor di mia doglia	London, c. 1742		
183	Caro autor di mia doglia	Hanover, c. 1710–12	Spurious, by Reinhard Keiser.	
184	Che vai pensando, folle pensier	Italy, c. 1707–09		
185	Conservate, raddoppiate	?Hanover, c. 1711	The 2nd movement, "Nodi voi" can be found later in the Opus 1 sonatas and also in the concerti grossi as well as various operas and oratorios.	
186	Fronda leggiera e mobile	London, c. 1745	The opening theme also appears in "Belshazzar" (HWV 61) as well as the Concerto a due cori No. 1 (HWV 332)	
187	Giù nei Tartarei regni	Composed: Italy, c. 1707		
188	Langue, geme, e sospira	London, c. 1722	Theme of the 2nd movement later appeared as "Thou hast prevented him" in the Coronation Anthem, "The King shall rejoice" (HWV 260)	Libretto by G.D. de Totis (from opera, "La caduta del regno dell'Amazzoni"; 1690)
189	No, di voi non vuo' fidarmi	London, 3 July 1741	Thematic ideas from 2 movements used in "Messiah" (HWV 56)	
190	No, di voi non vuo' fidarmi	London, 2 November 1742		
191	Quando in calma ride il mare	Italy or Hanover, c. 1707–11		
192	Quel fior che all'alba ride	London, 1 July 1741	3rd movement uses theme from, "Quel fior che all'alba ride," (HWV 154). Thematic ideas from 2 movements used in "Messiah" (HWV 56)	
193	Se tu non lasci amore	London, c. 1722 (?1711)	Thematic idea from 1st movement used in "Messiah" (HWV 56) as the duet, "Oh death, where is thy sting." Sections of the concluding movement use in Esther (HWV 50a), 1718, and there's the hint of the famous Air from the "Water Music."	
194	Sono liete, fortunate	?Hanover, c. 1710–11	The final movement was later used in the overture to "Judas Maccabeus" (HWV 63).	
195	Spero indarno	London, c. 1730–40	Single movement, known only from copies. Authenticity uncertain.	
196	Tacete, ohimè, tacete	Italy, c. 1707–09	Libretto by Francesco de Lemene (1692) which appears under the title "Amor dorme" in his "Poesie Diverse."	
197	Tanti strali al sen mi scocchi	?Hanover, c. 1711	Fugal movement later used in "Solomon" (HWV 67) for "Take him all."	
198	Troppo cruda, troppo fiera	?Hanover, c. 1711	Autograph lost.	
199	Va, speme infida	?Hanover, c. 1711	Autograph lost.	

== Italian trios ==
List of Italian trios by George Frideric Handel
HWV	Title	Composed	Notes	Text
200	Quel fior che all'alba ride	?Italy, c. 1707–09	Two versions, slightly different texts.	
201a	Se tu non lasci amore	Naples, 12 July 1708		
201b	Se tu non lasci amore	1708	First movement longer in Naples autograph than in most copies.	

== Hymns ==
List of hymns by George Frideric Handel
HWV	Title	Voice	Composed	Notes	Text
202	Künft'ger Zeiten eitler Kummer	Soprano	London, c. 1724–26		by B.H. Brockes from "Irdisches Vergnügen in Gott."
203	Das zitternde Glänzen der spielenden Wellen	Soprano	London, c. 1724–26		by B.H. Brockes from "Irdisches Vergnügen in Gott."
204	Süsser Blumen Ambraflocken	Soprano	London, c. 1724–26		by B.H. Brockes from "Irdisches Vergnügen in Gott."
205	Süsse Stille, sanfte Quelle ruhiger Gelassenheit	Soprano	London, c. 1724–26		by B.H. Brockes from "Irdisches Vergnügen in Gott."
206	Singe, Seele, Gott zum Preise	Soprano	London, c. 1724–26		by B.H. Brockes from "Irdisches Vergnügen in Gott."
207	Meine Seele hört im Sehen	Soprano	London, c. 1724–26		by B.H. Brockes from "Irdisches Vergnügen in Gott."
208	Die ihr aus dunkeln Grüften	Soprano	London, c. 1724–26		by B.H. Brockes from "Irdisches Vergnügen in Gott."
209	In den angenehmen Büschen	Soprano	London, c. 1724–26		by B.H. Brockes from "Irdisches Vergnügen in Gott."
210	Flammende Rose, Zierde der Erden	Soprano	London, c. 1724–26		by B.H. Brockes from "Irdisches Vergnügen in Gott."
284	Sinners obey the Gospel word (The Invitation)	Soprano	c. 1747	Probably at the request of Priscilla Rich.	by Charles Wesley.
285	O Love divine, how sweet thou art (Desiring to Love)	Soprano	c. 1747	Probably at the request of Priscilla Rich.	by Charles Wesley.
286	Rejoice, the Lord is King (On the Resurrection)	Soprano	c. 1747	Probably at the request of Priscilla Rich.	by Charles Wesley.

== Italian arias ==
List of Italian arias by George Frideric Handel
HWV	Title	Voice	Composed	Text
211	Aure dolci, deh, spirate	Alto	London, c. 1722–26	
212	Con doppia gloria mia	Soprano	London, c. 1722–26	
213	Con lacrime sì belle	Alto	London, c. 1717–18	
214	Dell'onda instabile	Alto	London, c. 1749	
215	Col valor del vostro brando	Soprano	London, c. 1711–13	
216	Impari del mio core	Soprano	London, c. 1749	
217	L'odio, sì, ma poi ritrovò	Alto	London, c. 1722–26	
219	Non so se avrai mai bene	Soprano	London, c. 1710–18	
220	Per dar pace al mio tormento	Soprano	London, c. 1749	
221	Quant'invidio tua fortuna	Soprano	London, c. 1749	
222	Quanto più amara fu sorte crudele	Soprano	London, c. 1721–23	
223	S'un dì m'appaga, la mia crudele	Soprano	London, c. 1738–41	
224	Sì, crudel, tornerà	Soprano	London, c. 1738–41	
225	Spera chi sa perchè la sorte	Alto	London, c. 1717–18	
227	Vo' cercando tra fiori	Soprano	London, c. 1726	

== English songs ==
List of English songs by George Frideric Handel
HWV	Title	Voice	Composed	Notes	Text
226	Hunting Song or The morning is charming	Tenor	1743	Voice in treble clef. Autograph, which survives, presented to Legh in 1751	by Charles Legh. Composed in London
228-1	The unhappy Lovers: As Celia's fatal arrows flew	Soprano	c. 1730		
228-2	Charming Cloris: Ask not the cause / The poor Shepherd: The Sun was sunk beneath the Hills	Soprano	c. 1730		
228-3	As on a Sunshine Summer's Day	Soprano	c. 1729		
228-4	Bacchus Speech in Praise of Wine: Bacchus one day gayly striding	Soprano	c. 1730		
228-5	The Polish Minuet or Miss Kitty Grevil's Delight: Charming is your shape and air	Soprano	c. 1720		
228-6	The Sailor's Complaint: Come and listen to my ditty / Hosier's Ghost: As near Portobello lying	Soprano	c. 1735		
228-7	Di godere ha speranza il mio core / Oh my dearest, my lovely creature	Soprano	c. 1719		
228-8	The forsaken Maid's Complaint: Faithless ungrateful / The slighted Swain: Cloe proves false	Soprano	c. 1720		
228-9	From scourging rebellion or A Song on the Victory obtained over the Rebels by His Royal Highness the Duke of Cumberland	Tenor	1746	First performance: Sung by Thomas Lowe at Vauxhall Gardens, 15 May 1746. Composed to celebrate the Duke of Cumberland's defeat of the Jacobite forces at Culloden on 16 April 1746	
228-10	The forsaken Nymph: Guardian Angels now protect me	Soprano	c. 1735		
228-11	I like the am'rous Youth that's free	Soprano	1737	First performance: 28 February 1737: London, Drury Lane Theatre. Published: 1741. Sung by Catherine ("Kitty") Clive in James Miller's comedy, "The Universal Passions" (Act II)	
228-12	Phillis: My fair, ye Swains, is gone astray	Soprano	c. 1725		
228-13	Not, Cloe, that I better am	Soprano	c. 1730		
228-14	Strephon's Complaint of Love: Oh cruel Tyrant Love	Soprano	c. 1730		
228-15	The Satyr's Advice to a Stock-Jobber: On the shore of a low ebbing sea / Ye Swains that are courting a Maid / Molly Mogg: Says my uncle, I pray you discover	Soprano	c. 1730		
228-16	Phillis be kind and hear	Soprano	c. 1730		
228-17	Phillis advised: Phillis the lovely	Soprano	c. 1739		
228-18	Stand round, my brave boys or Song made for the Gentlemen Volunteers of the City of London	Tenor	1745	First performance : Sung by Thomas Lowe in "The Relapse or Virtue in Danger" by John Vanbrugh, at Drury Lane Theatre, London: 14 November 1745. Published: 1745. Published as "A Song made for the Gentlemen Volunteers of the City of London" (1745)	
228-19	The faithful Maid / The Melancholy Nymph: 'Twas when the seas were roaring	Soprano	1715	First performance: 23 February 1715: London, Drury Lane Theatre. Incidental music; sung in Gay's "The Beggar's Opera" - Lucy's song XXVIII "How Cruel are the Traytors," probably sung in John Gay's "Comic Tragick Pastoral Farce" or The What D'Ye Call It, (Act II)	
228-20	The Rapture / Matchless Clarinda: When I survey Clarinda's charms / Venus now leaves	Soprano	c. 1725		
228-21	The Death of the Stag: When Phoebus the tops of the Hills does adorn	Soprano	c. 1740		
228-22	Who to win a Woman's favour	Soprano	c. 1746		
228-23	An Answer to Collin's Complaint: Ye winds to whome Collin complains	Soprano	c. 1716		
228-24	Yes, I'm in love	Soprano	c. 1740		

== German church cantatas ==
List of German church cantatas by George Frideric Handel
HWV	Title	Composed	notes
229-1	Das gantze Haupt ist krank à 8	Halle, c. 1700–03	music lost
229-2	Es ist der alte Bund, Mensch à 12	Halle, c. 1700–03	music lost
229-3	Führwahr, er trug unsere Krankheit à 15	Halle, c. 1700–03	music lost
229-4	Thue Rechnung von deinem Haußhalten à 13	Halle, c. 1700–03	music lost
229-5	Victoria. Der Tod ist verschlungen à 14	Halle, c. 1700–03	music lost
229-6	Was werden wir essen à 10/12	Halle, c. 1700–03	music lost
229-7	Wer ist der, so von Edom kömmt à 12	Halle, c. 1700–03	music lost

== Italian sacred cantatas ==
List of Italian sacred cantatas by George Frideric Handel
HWV	Title	Voice	Composed	Notes
230	Ah! che troppo ineguali or O del ciel! Maria regina	Soprano	?Rome 1707–08	Recitative and aria.
233	Donna, che in ciel	Soprano		First performance: ?2 February 1708, Rome on the "anniversary of the deliverance of Rome from the earthquake on the feast of the Purification of the Virgin."
234	Il pianto di Maria or Giunta l'ora fatal	Soprano		Spurious. Misattributed to Handel; composed by Giovanni Battista Ferrandini (1710–91).

== Latin church music ==
List of Latin church music including motets, Psalm settings, and antiphons by George Frideric Handel
HWV	Type	Title	Voice	Key	Composed	Premiere	Venue	Notes	Text
231	Motet	Coelestis dum spirat aura	Soprano	D major / G major	?Rome, 1707	13 June 1707	Vignanello	Motet for the Feast of St. Anthony of Padua	
232	Psalm setting	Dixit Dominus	Soprano, Alto, Tenor, Bass Chorus	G minor	Rome, April 1707			Dixit Dominus represents Handel's earliest dated autograph, and it is the earliest surviving autograph from his large-scale compositions.	Psalm 110 (Vulgate 109)
235	Antiphon	Haec est Regina virginum	Soprano	G major	?Rome, 1707	?15/16 July 1707	Rome	Probably written for services held at the church of S. Maria di Monte Santo to celebrate the feast day of "Madonna del Carmine".	
236	Psalm setting	Laudate pueri dominum	Soprano	F major	?Hamburg, c. 1706			Laudate pueri dominum in F major is Handel's earliest surviving autograph. Might have been composed in Halle, 1701-2.	Psalm 113 (Vulgate 112)
237	Psalm setting	Laudate pueri dominum	Soprano, Chorus	D major	Rome, 8 July 1707			Opening theme originally found in A. Lotti's Missa Sapientiae.	Psalm 113 (Vulgate 112)
238	Psalm setting	Nisi Dominus	Alto, Tenor, Bass, Chorus	G major	Rome, 13 July 1707	?16 July 1707	Rome	Probably written for a grand Vespers service held at the church of S. Maria di Monte Santo in Rome, the feast day of "Our Lady of Mount Carmel". The fugal theme is originally found in Antonio Lotti's Missa Sapientiae.	Psalm 127 (Vulgate 126)
239	Motet	O qualis de coelo sonus	Soprano	G major	?Rome, May – June 1707	12 June 1707	Vignanello	For Pentecost	
240	Motet	Saeviat tellus inter rigores	Soprano	D major	?Rome, 1707	?16 July 1707	Rome	Motet for the Feast of Madonna del Carmine	
241	Antiphon	Salve Regina	Soprano	G minor	?Rome, 1707	?19 June 1707	Vignanello	Probably first performed on Trinity Sunday at Francesco Ruspoli's private chapel.	
242	Motet	Silete venti	Soprano	B♭ major	London, c. 1723–25				
243	Antiphon	Te decus virgineum	Alto	G minor	Rome, 1707	?15/16 July 1707	Rome	Probably written for services held at the church of S. Maria di Monte Santo to celebrate the feast day of "Our Lady of Mount Carmel".	
244	Cantata	Kyrie eleison	Chorus					Misattributed to Handel; by A. Lotti ("Missa Sapientiae"), but copied by Handel c. 1749.	
245	Cantata	Gloria in excelsis deo	Chorus					Misattributed to Handel; by A. Lotti ("Missa Sapientiae"), but copied by Handel c. 1749.	
269		Amen...alleluja	Soprano, Bass	D minor	1735-46			Probably intended as a vocal study.	
270		Amen	Soprano, Bass	F major	1735-46			Probably intended as a vocal study.	
271		Amen...alleluja	Soprano, Bass	G minor	1735-46			Probably intended as a vocal study.	
272		Alleluja...amen	Soprano, Bass	D minor	1735-46			Probably intended as a vocal study.	
273		Alleluja...amen	Soprano, Bass	G major	1735-46			Probably intended as a vocal study.	
274		Alleluja...amen	Soprano, Bass	A minor	1735-46			Probably intended as a vocal study.	
276		Amen...hallelujah	Soprano, Bass	F major	1744-47			Probably intended as a vocal study.	
277		Hallelujah...amen	Soprano, Bass	F major	1744-47			Probably intended as a vocal study.	

== Anthems ==
List of anthems by George Frideric Handel
HWV	Title	Composed	Premiere	Venue	Notes	Text
246	O be joyful in the Lord	Cannons, 1717–18		St. Lawrence, Whitchurch, London	Chandos Anthem No. 1 or Jubilate ('Cannons') in D major. Also considered a Canticle. Opening theme originally found in "Laudate Pueri" (HWV 236), which itself borrowed the theme from A. Lotti's Missa Sapientia.	Psalm 100 (the Jubilate).
247	In the Lord put I my trust	Cannons, 1717–18		St. Lawrence, Whitchurch, London	Chandos Anthem No. 2. Transcribed for orchestra by Edward Elgar in 1923 as the Overture in D minor, and by Stokowski in 1924	Psalm 9, 11, 12, & 13 from Tate and Brady's New Version of the Psalms of David.
248	Have mercy upon me	Cannons, 1717–18		St. Lawrence, Whitchurch, London	Chandos Anthem No. 3.	Psalm 51 (the Miserere).
249a	O come, let us sing unto the Lord	1714	?26 September 1714	Chapel Royal, St. James's Palace, London.		Psalm 96
249b	O come, let us sing unto the Lord	Cannons, 1717–18		St. Lawrence, Whitchurch, London	Chandos Anthem No. 4. Partly based on "O sing unto the Lord a new song" (HWV 249a). The overture was later reused in Handel's oboe concerto No. 2.	"Prayer Book" version of Psalm 93 & 96.
250a	I will magnify thee	Cannons, 1717–18		St. Lawrence, Whitchurch, London	Chandos Anthem No. 5. Two movements added later. The overture was later reused in Handel's oboe concerto No. 2.	Psalms 144 & 145
250b	I will magnify thee	1724	?5 January 1724	Chapel Royal, St. James's Palace, London		Psalms 89, 96, 145
251a	As pants the hart	c. December 1712 to May 1713	1713	King's Chapel Royal	Scored for organ and basso continuo alone.	Psalm 42
251b	As pants the hart	Cannons, 1717–18	1718	St. Lawrence, Whitchurch, London	Chandos Anthem No. 6 (although believed to be one of the first Chandos Anthems composed). Orchestrated version of HWV 251a.	Psalm 42
251c	As pants the hart	c. 1722	?7 October 1722	Chapel Royal, St. James's Palace, London	Orchestrated version of HWV 251d.	Psalm 42
251d	As pants the hart	c. 1722			Scored for organ and basso continuo alone. There is no evidence that the work was performed during Handel's lifetime.	Psalm 42
251e	As pants the hart	1738	28 March 1738	King's Theatre, Haymarket	Written for a benefit evening	Psalm 42
252	My song shall be alway	Cannons, 1717–18		St. Lawrence, Whitchurch, London	Chandos Anthem No. 7. Partly derived from the "Te Deum in D" (HWV 280). The trio "Thou rulest the raging sea" performed at Cannons but probably spurious; possibly composed by Johann Christoph Pepusch or Nicola Francesco Haym instead.	Psalm 89
253	O come, let us sing unto the Lord	Cannons, 1717–18		St. Lawrence, Whitchurch, London	Chandos Anthem No. 8.	"Prayer Book" psalms 95 (the venite), 96, 97, 99, 103
254	O praise the Lord with one consent	Cannons, 1717–18		St. Lawrence, Whitchurch, London	Chandos Anthem No. 9.	Psalms 117, 135, 148 in metrical versions of Nahum Tate and Nicolas Brady's "New Version of the Psalms" (1696).
255	The Lord is my light	Cannons, 1717–18		St. Lawrence, Whitchurch, London	Chandos Anthem No. 10.	Psalms 18, 20, 27–30, 34, 45
256a	Let God arise	Cannons, 1717–18		St. Lawrence, Whitchurch, London	Chandos Anthem No. 11. 1st movement of 'symphony' added later.	Psalms 68 & 76
256b	Let God arise	1726	?16 January 1726	Chapel Royal, St. James's Palace, London		Psalm 58
257	O praise the Lord, ye angels of his				Spurious. Misattributed to Handel in Arnold's edition and in HG 36. By Maurice Greene, before 1728.	
258	Zadok the Priest	?9 September 1727 – 11 October 1727	11 October 1727	Westminster Abbey	Coronation Anthem No. 1. For the Coronation of King George II and Queen Caroline. Performed at the Anointing.	English version of antiphon "Unxerunt Salomonem Sadoc sacerdos," after I Kings 1, 39–48.
259	Let Thy Hand Be Strengthened	?9 September 1727 – 11 October 1727	11 October 1727	Westminster Abbey	Coronation Anthem No. 2. For the Coronation of King George II and Queen Caroline. Sung at the Recognition (the King being presented to the people).	Psalm 89: 13–14.
260	The King Shall Rejoice	?9 September 1727 – October 1727	11 October 1727	Westminster Abbey	Coronation Anthem No. 3. For the Coronation of King George II and Queen Caroline. Should have been sung at the Recognition, but instead it was performed at the Crowning.	Psalm 21: 1,2,3,5
261	My Heart is Inditing	?9 September 1727 – 11 October 1727	11 October 1727	Westminster Abbey	Coronation Anthem No. 4. For the Coronation of King George II and Queen Caroline. Performed during the coronation of the Queen.	After Psalm 45: 1, 10, 12 and Isaiah 49:23.
262	This is the day which the Lord hath made (Anthem for the wedding of Princess Anne)	1734	14 March 1734	French Chapel, St. James's Palace	Performed during the wedding of William, Prince of Orange, and Anne, Princess Royal.	Psalms 45, 118, Proverbs, Ecclesiasticus
263	Sing unto God (Anthem for the wedding of Prince Frederick)	1736	27 April 1736	German Chapel, St. James's Palace, London	For the wedding of Frederick, Prince of Wales, and Princess Augusta of Saxe-Coburg. Revised for the wedding of Princess Mary.	Psalms 68, 106, 128
264	Funeral Anthem for Queen Caroline	5(?) – 12 December 1737	17 December 1737	King Henry VII's Chapel, Westminster Abbey	Probably first performed fully choral without solo movements. The Sinfonia was not performed at the funeral and was probably added later.	From Lamentations, Samuel, Job, Ecclesiasticus, Philippians, Wisdom, and Psalms 103, 112.
265	Dettingen Anthem ("The King Shall Rejoice")	30 July – 3 August 1743	27 November 1743	Chapel Royal, St. James's Palace, London	Performed during a service in King George II's presence to celebrate his safe return to England. Also, to celebrate the combined Austrian and British armies over the French at Dettingen in Lower Franconia on 27 June 1743. Entirely different setting of the text than "The King Shall Rejoice" from the Coronation Anthems of 1727.	Psalms 20, 21
266	How beautiful are the feet of them (Peace Anthem)	1749	25 April 1749	Chapel Royal, St. James's Palace, London	To celebrate the peace of Aix-la-Chapelle (Aachen). Performed with the "Queen Caroline" Te Deum (HWV 280).	Isaiah, Psalms 29, 96, Revelation
267	(?) First draft of the "Peace Anthem" (See HWV 266)	Probably early 1749			A 209-measure composition of which the last 19 measures are incomplete.	
268	Foundling Hospital Anthem	1749	27 May 1749	Foundling Hospital Chapel, London	First performance probably in fully choral version. The solo movements were probably added c. 1751.	Psalms 8, 41, 72, 112, Daniel, Revelation

== Canticles ==
List of canticles by George Frideric Handel
HWV	Title	Key	Composed	Premiere	Venue	Notes	Text
278	Utrecht Te Deum	D major	14 January 1713	7 July 1713	St Paul's Cathedral, London		"We praise thee, O God" (Ambrosian hymn)
279	Utrecht Jubilate	D major	?January – February 1713.	7 July 1713	St Paul's Cathedral, London		"O be joyful in the Lord" (Psalm 100)
280	Te Deum ("Queen Caroline")	D major	1714	?26 September 1714	Chapel Royal, St. James's Palace, London		"We praise thee, O God" (Ambrosian hymn)
281	Te Deum ("Chandos" or "Cannons")	B♭ major	c. 1717–18	c. 1717–18	St. Lawrence, Whitchurch, London	Composed by Handel during his stay with the Duke of Chandos at Cannons.	"We praise thee, O God" (Ambrosian hymn)
282	Te Deum	A major	1726	?16 January 1726	Chapel Royal, St. James's Palace, London		"We praise thee, O God" (Ambrosian hymn)
283	Te Deum ("Dettingen")	D major	17 July – c. 29 July 1743	27 November 1743	Chapel Royal, St. James's Palace, London	Performed during a service, in King George II's presence, to celebrate his safe return to England. Also, to celebrate the victory of combined Austrian and British armies over the French at Dettingen in Lower Franconia on 27 June 1743.	"We praise thee, O God" (Ambrosian hymn)

== Concertos ==
List of concertos by George Frideric Handel
HWV	Instrument	Key	Composed	Premiere	Venue	Published	Opus	Notes
287	Oboe	G minor	?Hamburg ?c.1704–05			1863		"Oboe concerto No. 3"
288	Violin	B♭ major	Italy, c. 1707					"Sonata a 5". Possibly for Corelli in Rome
289	Organ	G minor	1735–36	19 February 1736	London, Covent Garden Theatre	1738	Opus 4 No. 1	First performed with "Alexander's Feast" (HWV 75)
290	Organ	B♭ major	1735	5 March 1735	London, Covent Garden Theatre	1738	Opus 4 No. 2	First performed with the oratorio "Esther" (HWV 50b)
291	Organ	G minor	1735	5 March 1735	London, Covent Garden Theatre	1738	Opus 4 No. 3	Variant versions of last movement. First performed with the oratorio "Esther" (HWV 50b)
292	Organ	F major	25 March 1735	1 April 1735	London, Covent Garden Theatre	1738	Opus 4 No. 4	Originally concluded with 'Alleluja' chorus (HG 20, p. 161), short instrumental ending probably written by Handel for Walsh publication. First performed with "Athalia" (HWV 52)
293	Organ	F major		?26 March 1735	London, Covent Garden Theatre	1738	Opus 4 No. 5	Performed with revival of "Deborah" (HWV 51).
294	Harp, later Organ	B♭ major	c. 1730 for Harp; 1732 for Organ	unknown; first performed with a choral work (HWV 75) in 1736	London, Covent Garden Theatre	1738	Opus 4 No. 6	Composed as a harp concerto, later arranged for organ; served as prototype for the organ concerto series
295	Organ	F major	2 April 1739	4 April 1739	London, King's Theatre, Haymarket	1740	"2nd Set" No. 1	Referred to as Organ Concerto "No. 13". The bird-song motives of the 2nd movement earned the concerto the nickname, "The Cuckoo and the Nightingale"
296a	Organ	A major	1739	20 March 1739	London, King's Theatre, Haymarket	1740	"2nd Set" No. 2	Referred to as organ concerto "No. 14"
296b	Organ	A major	c. 1743–46					Pasticcio. Arranged by Handel
297	Organ	D minor				1740	"2nd Set" No. 3	Referred to as organ concerto "No. 15". Arranged from Concerto Grosso Op.6 No.10 (HWV 328).
298	Organ	G major				1740	"2nd Set" No. 4	Referred to as organ concerto "No. 16". Arranged from Concerto Grosso Op.6 No.1 (HWV 319).
299	Organ	D major				1740	"2nd Set" No. 5	Referred to as organ concerto "No. 17". Arranged from Concerto Grosso Op.6 No.5 (HWV 323).
300	Organ	G minor				1740	"2nd Set" No. 6	Referred to as organ concerto "No. 18". Arranged from Concerto Grosso in G minor Op.6 No.6 (HWV 324).
301	Oboe	B♭ major				1740		"Oboe concerto No. 1"
302a	Oboe	B♭ major				1740		"Oboe concerto No. 2"
303	Organ	D minor	c. 1738					An adagio for two organs. Ending adapted by Handel to lead into another movement. Later published as the first movement of Organ Concerto in D minor, Op 7 No 4 (HWV 309)
304	Organ	D minor	c. 1746	?14 February 1746		1797		Sometimes referred to as organ concerto "No. 15". First performed with the premiere of The Occasional Oratorio (HWV 62).
305	Organ	F major	c. 1747–48					Sometimes referred to as organ concerto "No. 16". Arranged by Handel from the Concerto a due cori in F major (HWV 334) (3 movements) and Marche in F.
306	Organ	B♭ major	17 February 1740	27 February 1740	London, Lincoln's Inn Fields Theatre	1761	Opus 7 No. 1	First movement includes an independent pedal part
307	Organ	A major	5 February 1743	18 February 1743	London, Covent Garden Theatre	1761	Opus 7 No. 2	Performed with the oratorio Samson (HWV 57)
308	Organ	B♭ major	1–4 January 1751	1 March 1751	London, Covent Garden Theatre	1761	Opus 7 No. 3	Two variant autographs of 1st movement. Handel's last orchestral work
309	Organ	D minor	?c. 1744	?14 February 1746	London	1761	Opus 7 No. 4	?Performed with premiere of "The Occasional Oratorio" (HWV 62)
310	Organ	G minor	31 January 1750	16 March 1750	London, Covent Garden Theatre	1761	Opus 7 No. 5	Performed with "Theodora" (HWV 68). Final gavotte in published version probably added later by Smith Jr.
311	Organ	B♭ major	c. 1748–49	1749		1761	Opus 7 No. 6	Assembled by John Christopher Smith junior following Handel's death for John Walsh the younger's publication
343	Organ	G major	c. 1738–39					Ritornello for Chaconne (HWV 435). Part of a fragmentary outline of an organ concerto

== Concerti grossi ==
List of concerti grossi by George Frideric Handel
HWV	Key	Composed	Premiere	Venue	Published	Opus	Notes
312	B♭ major	?Hanover, c. 1710			1734	Opus 3 No. 1	No Handel autograph. Earliest surviving manuscript score from c. 1724. Probably the earliest concerto in the Op. 3 set
313	B♭ major	c. 1715–1718			1734	Opus 3 No. 2	
314	G major	c. 1717–1718	c. 1717–1718		1734	Opus 3 No. 3	Arranged (? by Walsh)
315	F major	1716	20 June 1716	London, King's Theatre, Haymarket	1734	Opus 3 No. 4	Referred to as either "The Orchestra Concerto" or "The Second Overture in Amadigi"
316	D minor	1717–1718			1734	Opus 3 No. 5	In Walsh's 2nd edition of the Op. 3 concertos, the 3rd, 4th, & 5th movements were added
317	D major	(?) 1733–1734			1734	Opus 3 No. 6	Published by Walsh in 1734 as an organ concerto
318	C major	25 January 1736	February 1736		1740		First performance between the acts of the oratorio, Alexander's Feast (HWV 75)
319	G major	29 September 1739			1740	Opus 6 No. 1	
320	F major	4 October 1739			1740	Opus 6 No. 2	
321	E minor	6 October 1739			1740	Opus 6 No. 3	
322	A minor	8 October 1739			1740	Opus 6 No. 4	
323	D major	10 October 1739			1740	Opus 6 No. 5	Known as the "St. Cecilia's Concerto," as the first two movements and the last use thematic material from the overture to the Ode for St. Cecilia's Day (HWV 76)
324	G minor	15 October 1739			1740	Opus 6 No. 6	
325	B♭ major	12 October 1739			1740	Opus 6 No. 7	
326	C minor	18 October 1739			1740	Opus 6 No. 8	
327	F major	Probably between 10–11 October 1739			1740	Opus 6 No. 9	The second two movements were borrowed from the Organ Concerto in F major, HWV 295, and the minuet and allegro fugue from the overture to Imeneo. The newly composed Gigue was originally intended for the Concerto Grosso in F major (HWV 320)
328	D minor	22 October 1739			1740	Opus 6 No. 10	The gavotte-like last movement was originally intended by Handel for the Concerto Grosso in B minor (HWV 330)
329	A major	30 October 1739			1740	Opus 6 No. 11	A reworking of the Organ Concerto in A major, HWV 296.
330	B minor	20 October 1739			1740	Opus 6 No. 12	
331	F major		20 March 1723	London, Drury Lane Theatre			Two movements, thematically related to the Water Music Suite in F major (HWV 348)
331-1	F major						Water Music, Suite Variant No 1. Two movements, thematically related to the Suite No 1 in F major from The Water Music (HWV 348)
331-2	F major						Water Music, Suite Variant No 2. Two movements, thematically related to the Suite No 1 in F major from The Water Music (HWV 348)
332	B♭ major	1747–1748	(?) 9 March 1748	London, Covent Garden Theatre			Concerto a due cori in B♭ major, No. 1. Composed for performances with oratorios; probably performed during Joshua (HWV 64)
333	F major	1747–1748	(?) 23 March 1748	London, Covent Garden Theatre			Concerto a due cori in F major, No. 2. Composed for performances with oratorios; probably performed during Alexander Balus (HWV 65)
334	F major	1747–1748	(?) 1 April 1748	London, Covent Garden Theatre			Concerto a due cori in F major, No. 3. Composed for performances with oratorios; probably performed during Judas Maccabaeus (HWV 63)
335a	D major	c. 1746					Version of the overture to the Fireworks music.
335b	F major	c. 1746					Version of the overture to the Fireworks music.

== Orchestral works ==
List of orchestral works by George Frideric Handel
HWV	Type	Key	Composed	Premiere	Published	Notes
302b	Largo	F major	c. 1738			Autograph headed "Suite de pieces" (presumably this was the opening movement)
336	Overture	B♭ major	c. 1707–1708			Autograph lost. Probably completed in Germany or Italy. May be the original French overture to Il Trionfo del Tempo e del Disinganno.
337	Overture	D major	c. 1722–1725			Probably intended as an introductory movement. Possibly intended to be coupled with the concerto grosso in D major Op. 3 No. 6 (HWV 317) as the adagio movement.
338	Adagio/Allegro	B minor / D major	1722			Originally, with the 1st movement of the Organ Concerto, Allegro in D minor (HWV 317), a 3-movement orchestral concerto. The 1st movement was used as the sinfonia in Ottone (HWV 15); and the theme of the last movement was reworked for the overture of Ottone
339	Sinfonia	B♭ major	c. 1706–1707		1979	No autograph. First published in 1979 in the Halle Edition (IV/15) and is known only from a copy by Christopher Graupner (1683–1760). Probably completed in Hamburg or Italy
340	Allegro	G major	?c. 1710–1715			No autograph
341	Suite	D major			1733	Almost certainly spurious
342	Overture	F major	c. 1736			
344	Chorus and Minuet	B♭ major	1708			No autograph. Apparently movements from the Hamburg opera Florindo (HWV 3) (See HWV 354)
345	March	D major	before 1738			No autograph
347	Sinfonia	B♭ major	c. 1747			
348	Suite. Water Music suite No. 1	F major	1717	17 July 1717	1788	Autograph lost. Performed for King George I on The Thames from a barge containing about 50 musicians. The King insisted on the performance being repeated more than once
349	Suite. Water Music suite No. 2	D major	1717	17 July 1717	1788	Autograph lost. Performed for King George I on The Thames from a barge containing about 50 musicians. The King insisted on the performance being repeated more than once
350	Suite. Water Music suite No. 3	G major	1717	17 July 1717	1788	Autograph lost. Performed for King George I on The Thames from a barge containing about 50 musicians. The King insisted on the performance being repeated more than once
351	Suite. Music for the Royal Fireworks	D major	1749	27 April 1749		Composed for the celebration of Peace of Aix-la-Chapelle (Aachen) which brought to an end the War of Austrian succession. First performed in Green Park, London
352	Suite	B♭ major	1706			No autograph
353	Suite	G major	1706			No autograph
354	Suite	B♭ major	1708			No autograph
355	Hornpipe aria	C minor	?c. 1710–1715			No autograph
356	Hornpipe	D major	1740			No autograph. Composed for Vauxhall Gardens
413	Gigue	B♭ major	1736			

== Solo sonatas ==
List of solo sonatas for various instruments (with keyboard accompaniment) by George Frideric Handel
HWV	Instrument	Key	Composed	Published	Opus	Notes
357	Oboe	B♭ major	c. 1707–10			One of Handel's earliest extant compositions. Probably written during his years in Italy
358	Unspecified	G major	c. 1707–10			A "Fitzwilliam" sonata. The autographed manuscript, located in the Fitzwilliam Museum, does not mention instrumentation, nor are there tempo markings for the movements. It is tentatively assigned to the violin in the HHA, though the recorder is also a possibility.
359a	Violin	D minor	c. 1724			The D minor sonata, headed "Sonata 2", follows the G major sonata (HWV 358) in the Fitzwilliam Museum autograph. Originally written for violin and published in two different E minor versions for the flute. See flute sonata in E minor (HWV 359b)
359b	Flute	E minor	c. 1724	1732	Opus 1 No. 1b	Of the two sonatas published by Chrysander as Opus 1 Sonata I, this one (Sonata I^{b}) is the one in Walsh's original edition (where it is called Sonata I).
360	Recorder	G minor	c. 1712	1732	Opus 1 No. 2	
361	Violin	A major	c. 1725–26	1732	Opus 1 No. 3	The only violin sonata to have been published exactly as written by Handel.
362	Recorder	A minor	c. 1712	1732	Opus 1 No. 4	
363a	Oboe	F major	c. 1711–16			
363b	Flute	G major	c. 1711–16	1732	Opus 1 No. 5	
364a	Violin	G minor	c. 1722–24	1732	Opus 1 No. 6	Both Walsh and Chrysander published the work as an oboe sonata.
364b	Viola da gamba	G minor	c. 1724			A transcription of HWV 364a—as suggested by Handel on the manuscript.
365	Recorder	C major	c. 1712		Opus 1 No. 7	
366	Oboe	C minor	c. 1711–12	1732	Opus 1 No. 8	
367a	Recorder	D minor	c. 1712		Opus 1 No. 9a	Movements 1–5 constitute the "Fitzwilliam Sonata III" in Thurston Dart's arrangement. Originally published Flute Sonata in B minor, Op 1 No 9b (HWV 367b). The contemporary edition of Handel attributes it to the transverse flute, but the autograph manuscript is clearly for the recorder.
367b	Flute	B minor	c. 1725–26	1732	Opus 1 No. 9b	In the 'Aylesford' collection the Alla breve appears with the title of FUGE
368	Violin	G minor		1732	Opus 1 No. 10	Probably spurious
369	Recorder	F major	c. 1712	1732	Opus 1 No. 11	
370	Violin	F major		1732	Opus 1 No. 12	Probably spurious
371	Violin	D major	c. 1749–50		Opus 1 No. 13	This sonata represents Handel's last piece of chamber music. The piece was not published by Walsh; the designation Op 1 No.13 is Chrysander's
372	Violin	A major		1732	Opus 1 No. 14	Probably spurious. The piece was published by Walsh as Op 1 No. 10 in the original edition that had a faked title page naming Roger as the publisher; the designation Op 1 No.14 is Chrysander's
373	Violin	E major		1732	Opus 1 No. 15	Probably spurious. The piece was published by Walsh as Op 1 No. 12 in the original edition that had a faked title page naming Roger as the publisher; the designation Op 1 No.15 is Chrysander's
374	Flute	A minor		1730		"Halle sonata No. 1". Authenticity uncertain
375	Flute	E minor		1730		"Halle sonata No. 2". Authenticity uncertain. The first two movements are identical to those of HWV 366, and the last also appears (out of context) at the end of Walsh's printing of HWV 434
376	Flute	B minor		1730		"Halle sonata No. 3". Authenticity uncertain
377	Recorder	B♭ major	c. 1712			All three movements appear as parts of other works
378	Flute	D major	c. 1707?	1979		No autograph, but now considered authentic. It appears in an important manuscript of 18th century solo sonatas in the Brussels Royal Conservatory, and is there attributed to 'Sr Weisse'
379	Flute	E minor	c. 1727–28	1879	Opus 1 No. 1a	The work's authenticity is unquestioned, but the sonata is not part of Handel's Opus 1 as published by Walsh—having been added by Chrysander.
406	Violin	A major	c. 1751			Adagio and Allegro. Three–part accompaniment (? orchestral short score)
407	Violin	G major	c. 1738			Allegro
408	Violin	C minor	c. 1725–29			Allegro. It may be the only surviving fragment of a completed sonata in C minor. Used as the finale to the Recorder sonata in A minor (HWV 362).
409	Recorder	D minor	c. 1712			Andante. Variant of movement from the Recorder Sonata in D minor (HWV 367a)
412	Violin	A minor	c. 1725–26			Andante
419-1	Unspecified	G major	c. 1710–20			HWV 419 1-6 are six marches. They are known only from printed sources; were published as separate treble and bass parts; with instrumentation unspecified, though title pages mention flute and violin for treble parts. May have originated as a keyboard work.
419-2	Unspecified	G major	c. 1710–20			
419-3	Unspecified	G major	c. 1710–20			
419-4	Unspecified	F major	c. 1710–20			
419-5	Unspecified	C major	c. 1710–20			
419-6	Unspecified	C major	c. 1710–20			
420	Unspecified	D major	c. 1743–44			Minuet. Two–stave versions in autograph; instrumentation unspecified, upper stave ? violins. May have originated as a keyboard work
421	Unspecified	D major	c. 1743–44			Minuet. Two–stave versions in autograph; instrumentation unspecified, upper stave ? violins. May have originated as a keyboard work

== Trio sonatas ==
List of trio sonatas by George Frideric Handel
HWV	Key	Composed	Published	Opus	Notes
380	B♭ major				Authenticity uncertain
381	D minor				Authenticity uncertain
382	E♭ major				Authenticity uncertain
383	F major				Authenticity uncertain
384	G major				Authenticity uncertain
385	D major				Authenticity uncertain
386a	C minor	c. 1717–1719	1879		In Chrysander's "G. F. Handel's Werke" (1879) this piece was referred to as Op. 2 No. 1a; Variant form of Op. 2 No 1, not published by Walsh, but found in manuscripts
386b	B minor	before 1727	1733	Opus 2 No. 1	In Chrysander's "G. F. Handel's Werke" this piece referred to as Op. 2 No 1b
387	G minor	?1699	1733	Opus 2 No. 2	Handel's earliest datable composition. In Chrysander's "G. F. Handel's Werke" this piece referred to as Op. 2 No 2
388	B♭ major	c. 1717–1718	1733	Opus 2 No. 3	In Chrysander's "G. F. Handel's Werke" this piece referred to as Op. 2 No 4. The finale appears in the overture to Athalia (HWV 52)
389	F major	c. 1718–1722	1733	Opus 2 No. 4	In Chrysander's "G. F. Handel's Werke" this piece referred to as Op. 2 No 5. The Larghetto appears in the overture to Esther (HWV 50a)
390a	G minor	c. 1717–1722	1733	Opus 2 No. 5	In Chrysander's "G. F. Handel's Werke" this piece referred to as Op. 2 No 6
390b	G minor				Published in HG volume 48. Unlikely to be Handel's work
391	G minor	c. 1707	1733	Opus 2 No. 6	In Chrysander's "G. F. Handel's Werke" this piece referred to as Op. 2 No 7
392	F major	c. 1706–1707			In Chrysander's "G. F. Handel's Werke" (1879) this composition referred to as Op. 2 No 3. One of the "Dresden" sonatas. No autograph
393	G minor	probably c. 1719			Authenticity uncertain. In Chrysander's "G. F. Handel's Werke" this piece referred to as Op. 2 No 8
394	E major				Authenticity uncertain. In Chrysander's "G. F. Handel's Werke" this piece referred to as Op. 2 No 9
395	E minor				Authenticity uncertain. Probably composed by Johann Adolph Hasse (1699–1783)
396	A major		1739	Opus 5 No. 1	
397	D major		1739	Opus 5 No. 2	
398	E minor		1739	Opus 5 No. 3	
399	G major		1739	Opus 5 No. 4	A tempo ordinario movement is based on the overture to "Parnasso in Festa" (HWV 73).
400	G minor		1739	Opus 5 No. 5	
401	F major		1739	Opus 5 No. 6	
402	B♭ major		1739	Opus 5 No. 7	
403	C major	c. 1738			
404	G minor				No autograph
405	F major	c. 1707–1710			

== Wind ensemble works ==
List of wind ensemble works by George Frideric Handel
HWV	Type	Key	Composed	Notes
346	March	F major	?before 1729	
410	Aria	F major	c. 1725	
411	Aria	F major	c. 1725	
414	March for Fife	C major	c. 1747	
415	March for Fife	D major	c. 1747	
416	March	D major	c. 1734	
417	March	D major	c. 1746–1747	May have originated as a keyboard work as a two-stave version of the march exists
418	March	G major	?c. 1741	
422	Minuet	G major	c. 1746–1747	
423	Minuet	G major	c. 1746–1747	
424	Overture	D major	c. 1741	'Fitzwilliam' Overture

== Keyboard works ==
List of keyboard works by George Frideric Handel
HWV	Type	Key	Composed	Published	Notes
305b	Arrangement	F minor	c. 1747		Used as an overture. Solo keyboard arrangement of the Organ Concerto in F major (HWV 305)
425	Air (Saraband)	E major			An individual movement. Composed by Handel at St. Giles extempore. Autograph c. 1740–50 includes Handel's transcription of opening melody
426	Suite de pièce Vol. 1 No. 1	A major	prior to 1720	1720	
427	Suite de pièce Vol. 1 No. 2	F major	prior to 1720	1720	I. Adagio (2:45): II. Allegro (1:53): III. Adagio (1:55): IV. Allegro (Fugue) (2:04):
428	Suite de pièce Vol. 1 No. 3	D minor	prior to 1720	1720	
429	Suite de pièce Vol. 1 No. 4	E minor	prior to 1720	1720	
430	Suite de pièce Vol. 1 No. 5	E major	prior to 1720	1720	4th.“The Harmonious Blacksmith” or "Air and Variations in E major". Also found in early manuscript scores as a "Chaconne" in G major (at least 2 variant forms)
431	Suite de pièce Vol. 1 No. 6	F♯ minor	prior to 1720	1720	
432	Suite de pièce Vol. 1 No. 7	G minor	prior to 1720	1720	6th.Passacaglia
433	Suite de pièce Vol. 1 No. 8	F minor	prior to 1720	1720	
434	Suite de pièce Vol. 2 No. 1	B♭ major	?1710–1717	1733	434-4: minuet in G minor which is also used in the flute sonata in E minor (HWV 375). Not part of the Suite de piece in B♭ major. 434-3 has the theme used by Johannes Brahms for his Handel Variations.
435	Suite de pièce Vol. 2 No. 2	G major	?1705–1717	1733	21 variations. A chaconne. The Ritornello in G major (HWV 343) was added to this composition
436	Suite de pièce Vol. 2 No. 3	D minor	c. 1721–1726	1733	
437	Suite de pièce Vol. 2 No. 4	D minor	c. 1703–1706	1733	3rd.Sarabande: the piece was used in an orchestral arrangement for Stanley Kubrick's Barry Lyndon.
438	Suite de pièce Vol. 2 No. 5	E minor	c. 1710–1717	1733	
439	Suite de pièce Vol. 2 No. 6	G minor	c. 1703–1706	1733	
440	Suite de pièce Vol. 2 No. 7	B♭ major	c. 1703–1706	1733	revised 1717–18
441	Suite de pièce Vol. 2 No. 8	G major	c. 1703–1706	1733	
442	Suite de piece Vol. 2 No. 9	G major	c. 1703–1706	1733	62 variations. Prelude and Chaconne. Two different preludes noted in sources (HWV 442/1b in Walsh)
443	Suite	C major	1700–1703		Includes Chaconne (of which there are 26 variations)
444	Partita	C minor	c. 1705–1706		
445	Suite	C minor	1705–1706		
446	Suite	C minor	c. 1703–1706		Composed for two harpsichords, but the music for only one harpsichord survives
447	Suite	D minor	c. 1738–1739		Written for Princess Louisa. Companion piece to the Suite in G minor (HWV 452)
448	Suite	D minor	c. 1705–1706		
449	Suite	D minor	c. 1705		
450	Partita	G major	c. 1700–1705		
451	Suite	G minor	c. 1703–1706		Allemande and Courante only
452	Suite	G minor	c. 1738–1739		Written for Princess Louisa. Companion piece to the Suite in D minor (HWV 447)
453	Suite	G minor	c. 1705–1706		
454	Partita	A major	c. 1703–1706		
455	Suite	B♭ major	c. 1705		Keyboard version of the overture in B♭ major (HWV 336) and the suite in B♭ major (HWV 354)
456-1	Arrangement		c. 1720–1727		Arrangement of the overture to the Italian opera "Il pastor fido"
456-2	Arrangement		c. 1720–1727		Arrangement of the overture to the Italian opera "Amadigi"
456-3	Arrangement		c. 1720–1727		Arrangement of the overture to the Italian opera "Flavio"
456-4	Arrangement		c. 1720–1727		Arrangement of the overture to the Italian opera "Rodelinda"
456-5	Arrangement		c. 1720–1727		Arrangement of the overture to the Italian opera "Riccardo Primo"
457	Air	C major	c. 1720–1721		
458	Air	C minor	?c. 1710–1720		Authenticity uncertain
459	Air	C minor	?c. 1710–1720		Authenticity uncertain
460	Air (March)	D major	c. 1720–1721		
461	Air (Hornpipe)	D minor	c. 1717–1718		
462	Air and minuet	D minor	c. 1724–1726		
463	Air	F major	c. 1707–1709		
464	Air	F major	c. 1724–1726		A version of the air from the "Water Music" (HWV 348–350)
465	Air and two Doubles	F major	c. 1710–1720		
466	Air	G minor	c. 1710–1720		For two-manual harpsichord (or possibly organ)
467	Air Lentement	G minor	c. 1710–1720		
468	Air	A major	c. 1727–1728		
469	Air	B♭ major	c. 1738–1739		Re-used in orchestral form in the Sinfonia in B♭ major (HWV 347) and the Organ Concerto in B♭ major (HWV 311)
470	Air	B♭ major	c. 1710–1720		For two-manual harpsichord (or possibly organ)
471	Air	B♭ major	c. 1710–1720		
472	Allegro	C major	c. 1705		
473	Allegro	C major	25 August 1738		Clock-Organ
474	Air	G major	c. 1736–1738		Based on the first chorus of "Acis and Galatea" (HWV 49a). Possibly for organ
475	Allegro	D minor	c. 1710–1720		
476	Allemande	F major	c. 1730–1735		
477	Allemande	A major	c. 1724–1726		
478	Allemande	A minor	c. 1705		
479	Allemande	B minor	c. 1721–1722		
480	Chorale	G minor	c. 1736–1740		Chorale melody "Jesu, meine Freude" in the middle part. Possibly for organ. A two-bar epilogue may represent a planned variation
481	Capriccio	F major	c. 1703–1706		
482-1	Arrangement		c. 1720–1725		Arrangement of the aria 'Molto voglio, molto spero' to the Italian opera 'Rinaldo'
482-2	Arrangement		c. 1720–1725		Arrangement of the aria 'Sventurato, godi, o core abbandonato' to the Italian opera 'Floridante'
482-3	Arrangement		c. 1720–1725		Arrangement of the aria 'Ombra cara di mia sposa' to the Italian opera 'Radamisto'
482-4	Arrangement		c. 1720–1725		Arrangement of the aria 'Pupille sdegnose! sareste pietose' to the Italian opera 'Muzio Scevola'
482-5	Arrangement		c. 1720–1725		Arrangement of the aria 'Come, se ti vedrò' to the Italian opera 'Muzio Scevola'
483	Capriccio	G minor	c. 1720–1721		
484	Chaconne with 49 variations	C major	c. 1700–1705		Version of the Chaconne in Suite HWV 443
485	Chaconne	F major	c. 1705		For a two-manual harpsichord
486	Chaconne	G minor	c. 1705		
487	Concerto	G major	c. 1710–1720		Two movements
488	Allegro (Courante)	F major	c. 1717–1718		In G major for the Suite de piece in G major, Vol. 2 No. 9 (HWV 442)
489	Courante	B minor	c. 1722		
490	Fantasie pour le clavecin,	C major	c. 1703–1706		
491	Gavotte	G major	c. 1705		
492	Gigue	F major	c. 1726–1727		
493	Gigue	G minor	c. 1704–1705		Two versions
494	Impertinence (Bourée)	G minor	c. 1705		
495	Lesson	D minor	c. 1705–1710		Early form (two variants) of the Suite de pièce in D minor, Vol. 1 No. 3 (HWV 428), movement six
496	Lesson	A minor	c. 1715–1720		
497 to 558	62 Minuets	Various			Two-stave pieces, probably for keyboard. Some related to minuets in other works
559	Passepied	C major	c. 1721–1722		
560	Passepied	A major	c. 1705		
561	Prelude	D minor	c. 1705–1706		Version of the prelude to the Suite de pièce in D minor, Vol. 2 No. 4 (HWV 437)
562	Prelude (Harpeggio)	D minor	c. 1711–1712		
563	Prelude	D minor	c. 1700–1703		
564	Prelude	D minor	c. 1705		
565	Prelude	D minor	c. 1710–1720		An early version of the Prelude to the Suite de pièce in D minor, Vol. 1 No. 3 (HWV 428)
566	Prelude	E major	c. 1710–1720		Associated in some manuscripts with movements in the Suite de pièce in F minor, Vol. 1 No. 8 (HWV 433)
567	Preludium	F major	c. 1710–1720		
568	Preludium	F minor	c. 1710–1720		Associated in some manuscripts with movements in the Suite de pièce in F minor, Vol. 1 No. 8 (HWV 433)
569	Preludium	F minor	?c. 1710–1720		Arpeggio del Cook. Authorship uncertain
570	Prelude (Harpeggio)	F♯ minor	c. 1717–1718		Originally associated with the Suite de pièce in F♯ minor, Vol. 1 No. 6 (HWV 431)
571	Prelude and Capriccio	G major	c. 1703–1706		Two movements
572	Prelude	G minor	c. 1710–1717		Originally associated with the Suite de pièce in G minor, Vol. 1 No. 7 (HWV 432)
573	Prelude (Harpeggio)	G minor	c. 1705		
574	Prelude and Allegro (Sonata)	G minor	c. 1705		Two movements
575	Prelude (Harpeggio)	A minor	c. 1717–1718		Coupled with the "Lesson in A minor"; HWV 496
576	Prelude and Allegro	A minor	c. 1705–1706		Two movements
577	Sonata (Fantasia) pour le clavecin,	C major	c. 1703–1705		
578	Sonata	C major	c. 1750		Clock-Organ. Music related to a setting of 'Amen' (HWV 277), the Concerto Grosso in C major for "Alexander's Feast" (HWV 318), and the "Air Lentement in G minor" (HWV 467)
579	Sonata (Fantasia)	G major	?c. 1707–1710		For a two-manual harpsichord (or possibly organ)
580	Sonata (Larghetto)	G minor	?c. 1707–1710		One movement
581	Sonatina	D minor	c. 1705		One movement
582	Sonatina (Fugue)	G major	c. 1721–1722		One movement
583	Sonatina	G minor	?c. 1721–1722		One movement
584	Sonatina	A minor	c. 1706–1708		One movement. Authenticity uncertain
585	Sonatina	B♭ major	c. 1721–1722		One movement
586	Toccata	G minor	c. 1710–1720		
587 to 597	Eleven pieces	C, F, and G	c. 1735–1740		"10 [sic] Tunes for Clay's Musical Clock" (Clock-Organ). Includes arrangements of opera arias
598 to 604	Seven pieces	C major, A minor	c. 1730–1740		Clock-Organ. HWV 600 (a version of HWV 588) named "A Voluntary for a Flight of Angels."
605	Fugue	G minor	c. 1711–1718	1735	No 1 of "Six Fugues or Voluntarys for the Organ or Harpsichord" published by Walsh in 1735
606	Fugue	G major	c. 1711–1718	1735	No 2 of "Six Fugues or Voluntarys for the Organ or Harpsichord" published by Walsh in 1735
607	Fugue	B♭ major	c. 1711–1718	1735	No 3 of "Six Fugues or Voluntarys for the Organ or Harpsichord" published by Walsh in 1735
608	Fugue	B minor	c. 1711–1718	1735	No 4 of "Six Fugues or Voluntarys for the Organ or Harpsichord" published by Walsh in 1735
609	Fugue	A minor	c. 1711–1718	1735	No 5 of "Six Fugues or Voluntarys for the Organ or Harpsichord" published by Walsh in 1735
610	Fugue	C minor	c. 1711–1718	1735	No 6 of "Six Fugues or Voluntarys for the Organ or Harpsichord" published by Walsh in 1735
611	Fugue	F major	c. 1705		No autograph
612	Fugue	E major			No autograph. Single source is from a manuscript of organ voluntaries; probably authentic, though the text of final bars is defective. The fugue subject is related to the "Water Music" overture
A^{15} 1 – 37	Minuets	Various			Arranged from music of opera arias

== Arrangements by/of other composers ==
List of Handel's music arranged by other composers
HWV	Genre	Name	Composed	Premiere	Venue	Libretto	Notes
A^{1}	Opera (pasticcio)	L'Elpidia, overo Li rivali generosi	1725	11 May 1725	London, King's Theatre, Haymarket (10 performances to 19 June)	?Nicola Haym, after A. Zeno, 1697	Revival on 30 November 1725: London, King's Theatre, Haymarket (4 performances to 11 December)
A^{3}	Opera (pasticcio)	Ormisda	1730	4 April 1730	London, King's Theatre, Haymarket (13 performances to 14 May; also 9 June)	?Rossi, after Zeno, 1722	12 songs changed at 21 April 1730 performance, for Strada's benefit. Revival on 28 November 1730: London, King's Theatre, Haymarket (5 performances to 8 December).
A^{4}	Opera (pasticcio)	Venceslao	1731	11 January 1731	London, King's Theatre, Haymarket (4 performances to 23 January)	?Rossi, after Zeno, 1724	
A^{6}	Opera (pasticcio)	Lucio Papirio dittatore	1732	23 May 1732	London, King's Theatre, Haymarket (4 performances to 6 June)	After Zeno/C.I. Frugoni, 1729	
A^{7}	Opera (pasticcio)	Catone	1732	4 November 1732	London, King's Theatre, Haymarket	After Metastasio, 1728/9	
A^{8}	Opera (pasticcio)	Semiramide or Semiramis riconosciuta	1733	30 October 1733	London, King's Theatre, Haymarket	After Metastasio, 1729	
A^{9}	Opera (pasticcio)	Caio Fabricio	1733	4 December 1733	London, King's Theatre, Haymarket	After Zeno, 1732	
A^{10}	Opera (pasticcio)	Arbace	1734	5 January 1734	London, King's Theatre, Haymarket	After Metastasio, 1730	
A^{12}	Opera (pasticcio)	Didone	1737	13 April 1737	London, Covent Garden Theatre	After Metastasio, 1726	Pasticcio by Händel using Leonardo Vinci's Didone abbandonata

== HWV missing ==
List of Handel's compositions that are not included in the HWV Catalogue
Genre	Name	Composed	Premiere	Venue	Notes
Aria	The Beauteous Cloe or 'Cloe, you're witty'				A recycling of the aria 'S'io dir potessi' from Ottone (HWV 15), possibly by Handel himself.
Aria	Dicente mis ojos				Reworked version of the final aria of the Spanish cantata Nò se emenderá jamás (HWV 140)
Song	The Dream or 'Beneath a shady willow'				Based on the middle section of the opening chorus of Acis and Galatea (HWV 49a)
Latin sacred cantata	Gloria	?1703–1709	3 June 2001	The International Händel Göttingen Festival	For soprano, two-part violins, basso continuo. Identified in the year 2001 at the Royal Academy of Music's library (London). The manuscript is not in Handel's hand.
Italian Aria	Lusinga questo cor	c. 1712–1717			For soprano. Probably completed in London
Orchestral	March in 'Judas Maccabaeus' in F major	c. 1747–1748			As addition to oratorio "Judas Maccabaeus" (HWV 63) or to Concerto a due cori in F major (HWV 334)
Wind ensemble	Marche in G major	c. 1746–1747			Independent wind version of the oratorio, "Judas Maccabeus" march (HWV 63, no. 32a)
Wind ensemble	Marche lentement in C major	c. 1741			Wind version of the oratorio, Samson's (HWV 57) "Dead March"
Italian Aria	No Kossi presto nò				For soprano. Text apparently macaronic Italian-German
Aria	Der Mund spricht zwar				Reworked version of the aria from the opera Almira (HWV 1)
Opera (pasticcio)	Lucio Vero	1745	November 1745	King's Theatre, London	A pasticcio opera containing music by Handel and performed by the "Middlesex" opera company (named after Lord Middlesex)
Oratorio (pasticcio)		1738	28 March 1738	King's Theatre, Haymarket, London	Handel's benefit performance. Bilingual pasticcio, including much music from "Deborah" (HWV 51), "As pants the hart" (Chandos Anthem No. 6; HWV 251b), a Coronation Anthem, and organ concertos
Oratorio (pasticcio)	Nabal		16 March 1764	Covent Garden Theatre, London	
Oratorio (pasticcio)	Rebecca				
Oratorio (pasticcio)	Gideon		10 February 1769	Covent Garden Theatre, London	
Aria	Quand on suit l'amoureuse loi				A short da capo aria in the style of a gavotte
Opera	Rossane	1743	November 1743	King's Theatre, London	Revived 24 February 1747 and 20 February 1748 at the King’s Theatre, Haymarket, London. Lampugnani arranged music from Handel's "Alessandro" (HWV 21), which was subsequently performed by the "Middlesex" opera company
French song	Sans y penser				Another version of the French song (HWV 155) in a lower key and a simpler bass line
Italian Aria	Sa perchè pena il cor	c. 1712–1717			For alto
Orchestral Suite	Water Music chamber suite				Nine movements. The arrangement is contemporary, but the authenticity is uncertain. Published by Burrows in 1991
Secular/Sacred Hybrid Oratorio	Tobit				Compiled by John Christopher Smith from Handel’s operas, oratorios and other works, the oratorio Tobit, sometimes described as a pastiche, provided a winning synthesis of religion and entertainment at a time when newly-minted oratorios, drawing chiefly on biblical subjects were in vogue.

== Previously attributed ==
The following works are no longer thought to have been composed by Handel:

- The Passion nach dem Evang. Johannes (the Passion according to the evangelist John). The work was published in volume nine of the Händel-Gesellschaft (1860), but is now thought to have been composed by the German composer Georg Böhm.

== See also ==
- George Frideric Handel
- Händel-Werke-Verzeichnis
- Händel-Gesellschaft
- Publications by Friedrich Chrysander
- Hallische Händel-Ausgabe
- Handel Reference Database
