= Flute sonata in E minor =

Flute sonata in E minor may refer to:

- Flute sonata in E minor (HWV 375)
- Flute sonata in E minor (HWV 359b)
- Flute sonata in E minor (HWV 379)
