= Violin sonata in D minor (HWV 359a) =

Composition by George Frideric Handel

Portrait of George Frideric Handel by Balthasar Denner, c. 1726–28

The Violin sonata in D minor (HWV 359a) was composed (c. 1724) by George Frideric Handel, for violin and keyboard (harpsichord). The work is also referred to as HHA iv/18,10. (There is no HG designation for the work.)

The work is headed "Sonata 2", and follows the G minor sonata in the Fitzwilliam Museum autograph. The sonata (for violin) was not one of the ones published by either Walsh or Chrysander; however, it was reworked as a flute sonata in E minor (HWV 359b) in both their publications.

A typical performance of the work takes just over seven minutes.

== Movements ==
The work consists of four movements:

1. Grave
2. Allegro
3. Adagio
4. Allegro

== See also ==
- List of solo sonatas by George Frideric Handel
