= Caroline of Great Britain =

Caroline of Great Britain or Caroline of the United Kingdom may refer to:

- Caroline of Ansbach (1683–1737), queen consort of George II
- Princess Caroline of Great Britain (1713–1757), third daughter of George II
- Caroline of Brunswick (1768–1821), queen consort of George IV
- Princess Caroline of Gloucester (1774–1775), great-granddaughter of George II

== See also ==
- Caroline Matilda of Great Britain (1751–1775), Queen of Denmark and granddaughter of George II
- Caroline, Princess of Wales (disambiguation)
- Princess Caroline Mathilde of Saxe-Coburg and Gotha (1912–1983), great-granddaughter of Queen Victoria and British princess by birth until her title was revoked
- Princess Caroline (disambiguation)
- Queen Caroline (disambiguation)
