= Caroline of Hanover (disambiguation) =

Caroline of Hanover (born 1957) is the wife of Ernst August von Hannover, Head of the House of Hanover.

Caroline of Hanover may also refer to:

- Caroline of Ansbach (1683–1737), electress consort of George II Augustus, Elector of Hanover
- Caroline of Brunswick (1768–1821), queen consort of George IV, King of Hanover

== See also ==
- Princess Caroline (disambiguation)
- Queen Caroline (disambiguation)
