= Dalla guerra amorosa =

Secular cantata by Georg Frideric Handel

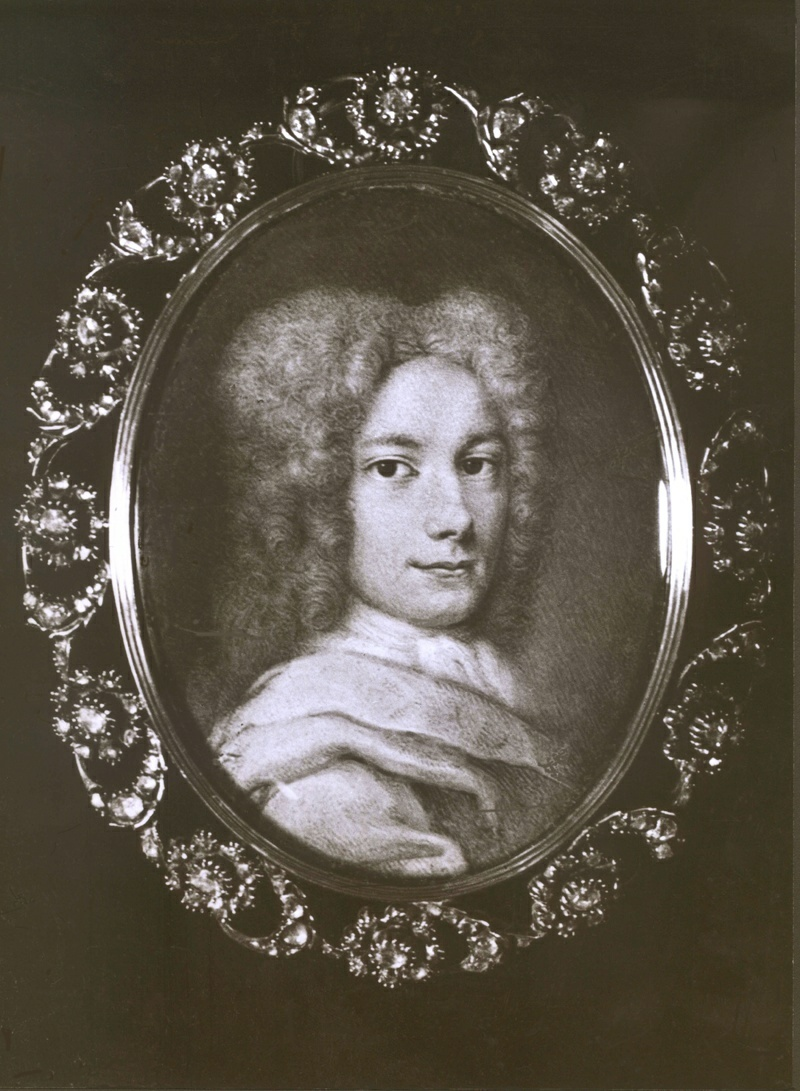
Händel c. 1710

Dalla guerra amorosa (HWV 102) is a secular chamber cantata for either bass (HWV 102^{a}) or soprano (HWV 102^{b}) written by Georg Frideric Handel in Italy during 1708–9. Other catalogues of Handel's music have referred to the work as HG l,34; (there is no HHA numbering). The title of the cantata roughly translates as "From the war of amorous passion".

Dalla guerra amorosa, is thought to be among the works written for Francesco Maria Marescotti Ruspoli, 1st Prince of Cerveteri, as the manuscript source is a copy made for Ruspoli in August 1709. This work is delicate and even poignant – the aria to the fading of beauty, La bellezza è come un fiore, is reminiscent of Come rosa in su la spina in Apollo e Dafne. The cantata has a refrain (Fuggite, sì fuggite) which is also reflected in the music, and ends with a delightful arioso following the last refrain.

A typical performance lasts between 8 and 11 minutes.

== Movements ==
The work has five movements:

	Type	Key	Meter	Tempo	Bars	Text (Italian)	Notes
I	Recitative		4/4		9	Dalla guerra amorosa or che ragion mi chiama oh miei pensieri fuggite pur, fuggite vergognosa non è in amor la fuga, che sol fuggendo un'alma del crudo amor può riportar la palma.	
II	Aria	B♭ major	3/8	Allegro	128	Non v'alletti un occhio nero, con suoi sguardi lusinghiero, che da voi chieda pietà Che per far le sue vendette, e con arco e con saette, ivi amor nascoso sta.	Includes a "Da Capo", "Fine" instruction.
III	Recitative		4/4		13	Fuggite, si fuggite, ahi! di quanto veleno amore asperge i suoi piaceri, ah! quanto ministra duolo e pianto, a chi lo segue, e le sue leggi adora. Se un volto v'innamora, sappiate, oh pensier miei, che ciò che piace in brev'ora svanisce, e poi dispiace.	
IV	Arioso	D minor	4/4		26	La bellezza è come un fiore: sul matin vivace e bello, sul matin di primavera, Che la sera langue e more, si scolora e non par quello.	Two sections (11 and 15 bars)—each with repeat markings.
V	Arioso	F major	4/4		25	Fuggite, sì fuggite, a chi servo d'amor vive in catena, è dubbioso il gioir, certa è la pena.	

(Movements do not contain repeat markings unless indicated. The number of bars is the raw number in the manuscript—not including repeat markings. The above is taken from the Händel-Gesellschaft edition (volume 50, page 34).

== See also ==
- List of cantatas by George Frideric Handel
