= Flute sonata in B minor =

Flute sonata in B minor may refer to:

- Flute sonata in B minor (HWV 367b)
- Flute sonata in B minor (HWV 376)
