= The Cuckoo and the Nightingale =

The Cuckoo and the Nightingale may refer to:

- The Book of Cupid, God of Love or The Cuckoo and the Nightingale, by John Clanvowe
- The Organ Concerto in F major "The Cuckoo and the Nightingale" by George Frideric Handel
