= Flute sonata in E minor (HWV 379) =

Composition by George Frideric Handel

Portrait of George Frideric Handel by Balthasar Denner, c. 1726–28

The Flute sonata in E minor (HWV 379) was composed (circa 1727–28) by George Frideric Handel for flute and basso continuo. The work is also referred to as Opus 1 No. 1a, and was first published in 1879 by Chrysander. Other catalogues of Handel's music have referred to the work as HG xxvii,2; and HHA iv/3,2.

The work is the only sonata that survives as a flute sonata in Handel's own manuscript.

Of the two sonatas published in the Chrysander edition as Opus 1 Sonata I, this one (Sonata I^{a}) is not in the Walsh edition. Although the work's authenticity is not in question, it was not included in the original Walsh edition of Handel's Opus 1, and so is not strictly considered part of that opus. Chrysander's Sonata I^{a} and Sonata I^{b} have their first and fourth movements in common.

A typical performance of the work takes about 13 minutes.

== Movements ==
The work consists of five movements:

	Tempo	Key	Meter	Bars	Notes
I	Larghetto	E minor	4/4	21	In common with the first movement of the flute sonata in E minor (HWV 359b). Ends with a brief adagio.
II	Andante	E minor	3/4	60	Two sections (30 and 30 bars)—each with repeat markings. Begins the same way as Halle sonata no. 2.
III	Largo	G major	4/4	21	The beginning is famous from its much later use in the violin sonata in D major (HWV 371). The opening bars are also shared with the adagio first movement of the flute sonata in D major (HWV 378). Concludes on a B major chord.
IV	Allegro	E minor	3/8	75	Two sections (31 and 44 bars)—each with repeat markings. Passepied-like in a brisk tempo. In common with the fourth movement of the flute sonata in E minor (HWV 359b).
V	Presto	E minor	4/4	33	Two sections (13 and 20 bars)—each with repeat markings. Uses a favourite theme of Handel's.

(Movements do not contain repeat markings unless indicated. The number of bars is taken from the Chrysander edition, and is the raw number in the manuscript—not including repeat markings.)

== See also ==
- Handel flute sonatas
- List of solo sonatas by George Frideric Handel
- XV Handel solo sonatas (publication by Chrysander)
- Handel solo sonatas (publication by Walsh)
