= Sonata in G major (HWV 358) =

Musical composition by G. F. Handel

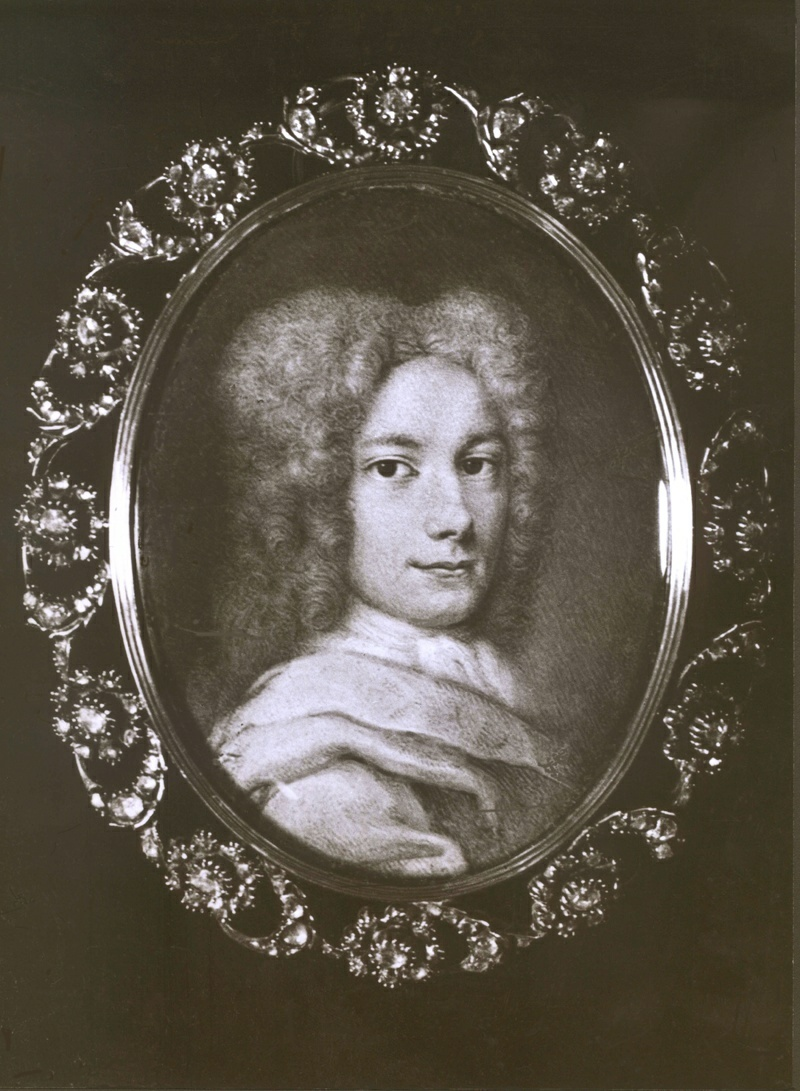
George Frideric Handel c. 1710

The Sonata in G major (HWV 358) was composed (c. 1707–10) by George Frideric Handel, for an unspecified instrument and keyboard (harpsichord). The work is also referred to as HHA iv/18,3. (There is no HG designation for the work.)

For an unknown reason, Handel did not indicate the instrumentation or the tempo markings on the movements. In fact, the original manuscript does not even mention that it is a "sonata". The tessitura is high for a violin, and the work does not fall below G_{4} (which is a whole octave above the violin's lowest note). For this reason (although the violin is the most likely instrument), the recorder is sometimes used for performance.

The work is referred to as one of the Fitzwilliam Sonatas.

A typical performance of the work takes almost five minutes.

== Movements ==
The work consists of three movements:

	Tempo	Notes
I	Allegro	A semiquaver melody that consists throughout the piece, almost étude-like. Consists of a lot of string changes.
II	Adagio	Dark major piece, very slow and romantic.
III	Allegro	Four extremely high notes (that do not fit the accompanying harmony) are found towards the end of the movement.

Note that the tempo for each movement was not marked on the score, and the above are by general agreement by subsequent publishers.

== See also ==
- List of solo sonatas by George Frideric Handel
