= Princess Caroline =

Princess Caroline may refer to:

- Caroline of Great Britain (disambiguation), various princesses
- Caroline of Brunswick (1768–1821), queen consort of George IV, King of the United Kingdom, and princess of Brunswick by birth
- Princess Caroline of Denmark (1793–1881), eldest surviving daughter of Frederick VI, King of Denmark
- Princess Caroline of Monaco (born 1957), eldest child of Rainier III, Prince of Monaco, and Grace Kelly

== See also ==
- Caroline (disambiguation)
- Caroline Matilda of Great Britain (1751–1775), queen consort of Christian VII, King of Denmark, and British princess by birth
- Caroline of Hanover (disambiguation)
- Caroline, Princess of Wales (disambiguation)
- Princess Caroline Laetitia Murat (1832–1902), eldest child of Lucien, 3rd Prince Murat
- Princess Caroline Mathilde of Saxe-Coburg and Gotha (1912–1983), youngest daughter of Charles Edward, Duke of Saxe-Coburg and Gotha
- Princess Carolyn, a fictional cat from the American television series BoJack Horseman
- Queen Caroline (disambiguation)
