= Caroline, Princess of Wales =

Caroline, Princess of Wales may refer to:

- Caroline of Ansbach (1683–1737), Princess of Wales from 1714 to 1727 by marriage to George, Prince of Wales (later George II)
- Caroline of Brunswick (1768–1821), Princess of Wales from 1795 to 1820 as wife of George, Prince of Wales (later George IV)

== See also ==
- Caroline, Princess of Wales and Princess Charlotte, a painting by Thomas Lawrence, 1801
- Caroline of Great Britain (disambiguation)
- Princess Caroline (disambiguation)
- Princess of Wales (disambiguation)
