= Flute sonata in D major (HWV 378) =

Musical composition by G. F. Handel

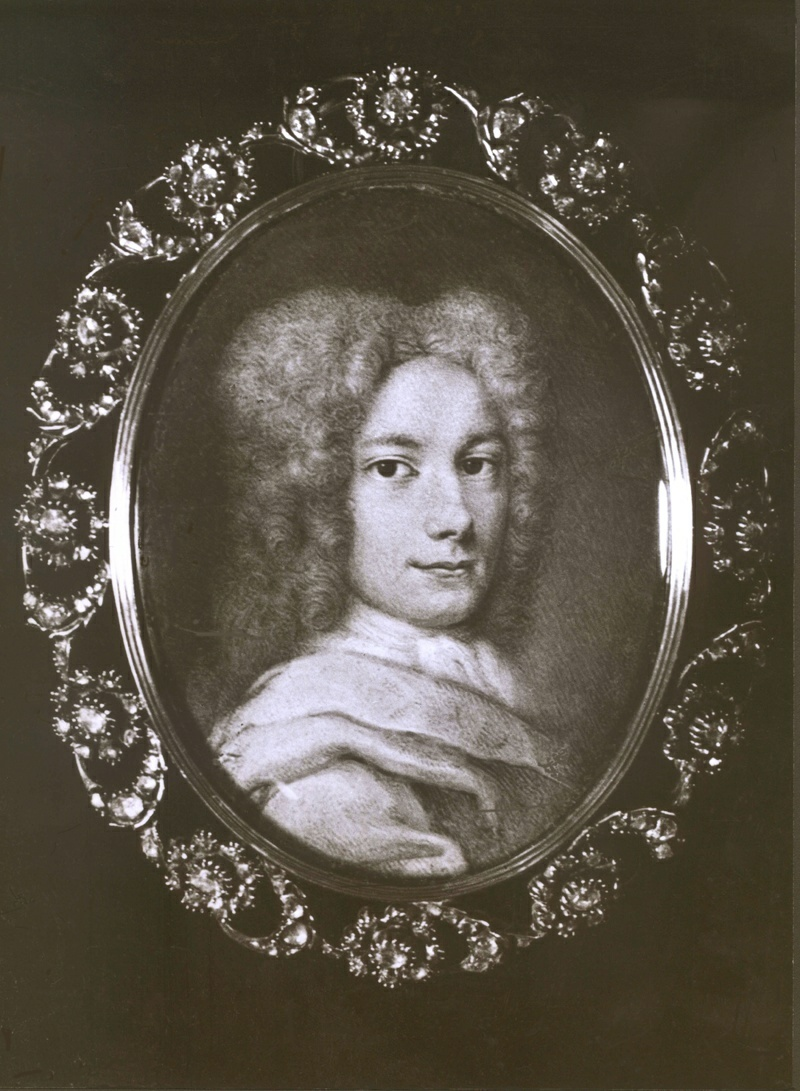
Handel c. 1710

The Flute sonata in D major (HWV 378) was composed (circa 1707) by George Frideric Handel, for flute and basso continuo. The work is also referred to as HHA iv/18,41.

The work was originally attributed to 'Sr Weisse' (Johann Sigismund Weiss), but is now considered to have been written by Handel. There is no autograph, but the sonata appears in an important manuscript of 18th century solo sonatas in the Brussels Royal Conservatory, and was published in facsimile in 1979.

A typical performance of the work takes about seven minutes.

== Movements ==
The work consists of four movements:

	Tempo	Notes
I	Adagio	The poetic opening bars are shared with the largo third movement of the flute sonata in E minor (HWV 379), and with a movement from the violin sonata in D major (HWV 371). The continuation here is closer to the violin sonata
II	Allegro	In a 3/8 spirited tempo. Based on ideas that Handel used in an overture written in Italy and a trio sonata
III	Adagio	A recitative-like piece
IV	Allegro	Begins similarly to one of Handel's recorder sonata finales. In jig rhythm

== See also ==
- Handel flute sonatas
- List of solo sonatas by George Frideric Handel
