= Oboe Concerto No. 2 (Handel) =

1740 composition by George Frideric Handel

Portrait of George Frideric Handel by Balthasar Denner, c. 1726–28

The Oboe Concerto No. 2 in B♭ major (HWV 302a) was composed by George Frideric Handel for oboe, orchestra and basso continuo. It was first published in the fourth volume of Select Harmony by Walsh in 1740. Other catalogues of Handel's music have referred to the work as HG xxi, 91; and HHA iv/12,47.

The concerto borrows extensively from the overtures to the Chandos Anthems O come, let us sing unto the Lord (HWV 249b) and I will magnify thee (HWV 250a)—which were combined and transposed for the work. It has been suggested that the work was arranged by Handel for the Dutch oboist Jean Christian Kytch.

A typical performance of the work takes almost nine minutes.

== Movements ==
The work consists of four movements:

1. Vivace
2. Allegro (a fugue)
3. Andante
4. Allegro (in triple time)

== See also ==
- Handel's concertos
