= Jean Christian Kytch =

Jean Christian Kytch (died 1738) was a Dutch Baroque-era oboist. Based on works he is known to have performed, it is thought that he possessed considerable technical ability on the oboe.

He was known as "Handel's oboist" and Handel's use of a solo oboe in many of his works was almost certainly inspired by the playing of Kytch. It is thought that Handel arranged his Oboe concerto No. 2 for Kytch.

== Career ==
Kytch's career included:

- Work in the orchestra of the London Opera House around 1712.
- Employment by the Duke of Chandos (James Brydges) during at least 1719 and 1720.
- A musician for the Chapel Royal services in the 1720s.

== Legacy ==
It is said that the plight of Kytch's children after their father's death prompted the establishment of the Fund for the Support of Decayed Musicians and their Families. Handel contributed generously to the fund.

== See also ==
- List of oboists
