= Queen Caroline =

Queen Caroline may refer to:

- Caroline of Ansbach (1683–1737), queen consort of George II, King of Great Britain
- Caroline of Brunswick (1768–1821), queen consort of George IV, King of the United Kingdom
- Caroline of Baden (1776–1841), queen consort of Maximilian I Joseph, King of Bavaria
- Caroline Bonaparte (1782–1839), queen consort of Joachim Murat, King of Naples

== See also ==
- Caroline Matilda of Great Britain (1751–1775), queen consort of Christian VII, King of Denmark
- Maria Carolina of Austria (1752–1814), queen consort of Ferdinand IV, King of Naples
- Caroline Augusta of Bavaria (1792–1873), queen consort of Francis I, King of Hungary
- Caroline Amalie of Augustenburg (1796–1881), queen consort of Christian VIII, King of Denmark
- Carola of Vasa (1833–1907), queen consort of Albert, King of Saxony
- Princess Caroline (disambiguation)
- Queen Caroline Te Deum, a canticle by George Frideric Handel, 1714
