= Flute sonata in B minor (HWV 376) =

Composition by George Frideric Handel

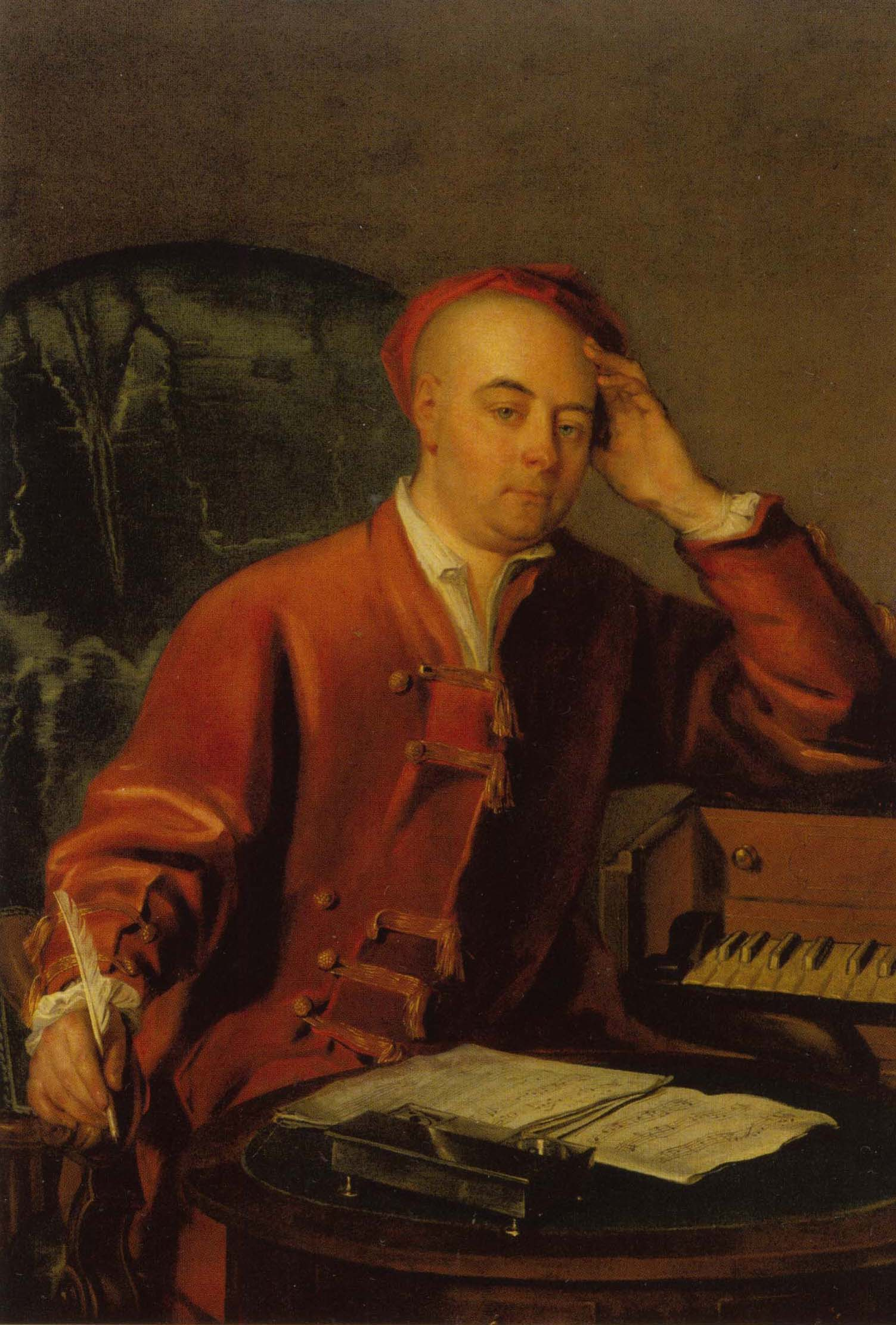
George Frideric Handel, by Philippe Mercier, c.1730

The Flute sonata in B minor (HWV 376) is thought to have been composed by George Frideric Handel, for flute and basso continuo. The date of composition of the work is unknown, but it was first published in 1730. Other catalogues of Handel's music have referred to the work as HG xlviii, 137; and HHA iv/3,68.

The authenticity of the sonata is uncertain. Of the three "Halle" sonatas, it is the best candidate for not having been composed by Handel (although if it wasn't, it is an extremely good imitation of his style). It is referred to as "Halle Sonata No. 3", and is sometimes called "Hallenser Sonaten" (following Chrysander's assumption that it was an early work). The Chrysander edition indicates that the work is for flute ("Traversa"), and published it as Sonata XVIII.

A typical performance of the work takes almost seven minutes.

It is quoted at length in the second movement of the ballet Pulcinella by Igor Stravinsky.

== Movements ==
The work consists of four movements:

	Tempo	Key	Meter	Bars	Notes
I	Adagio	B minor	4/4	21	Shows a typical Handelian relationship between the flute line and the bass—with imitations and overlapping phrases.
II	Allegro	B minor	4/4	58	Two sections (18 and 40 bars)—each with repeat markings. The first section concludes in F♯ major, and the second section begins in D major. In cut-common time. A type of two-voice fugue with textural interchanges between voices.
III	Largo	?	3/4	17	A brief movement beginning in D major and ending in F♯ major.
IV	Allegro	B minor	3/8	67	Two sections (23 and 44 bars)—each with repeat markings. The first section concludes in F♯ major, and the second section begins in D major. A spritely movement which begins like a Handelian opera aria.

(Movements do not contain repeat markings unless indicated. The number of bars is taken from the Chrysander edition, and is the raw number in the manuscript—not including repeat markings.)

== See also ==
- Handel flute sonatas
- List of solo sonatas by George Frideric Handel
- XV Handel solo sonatas (publication by Chrysander)
