= Violin sonata in D major (HWV 371) =

Composition by George Frideric Handel

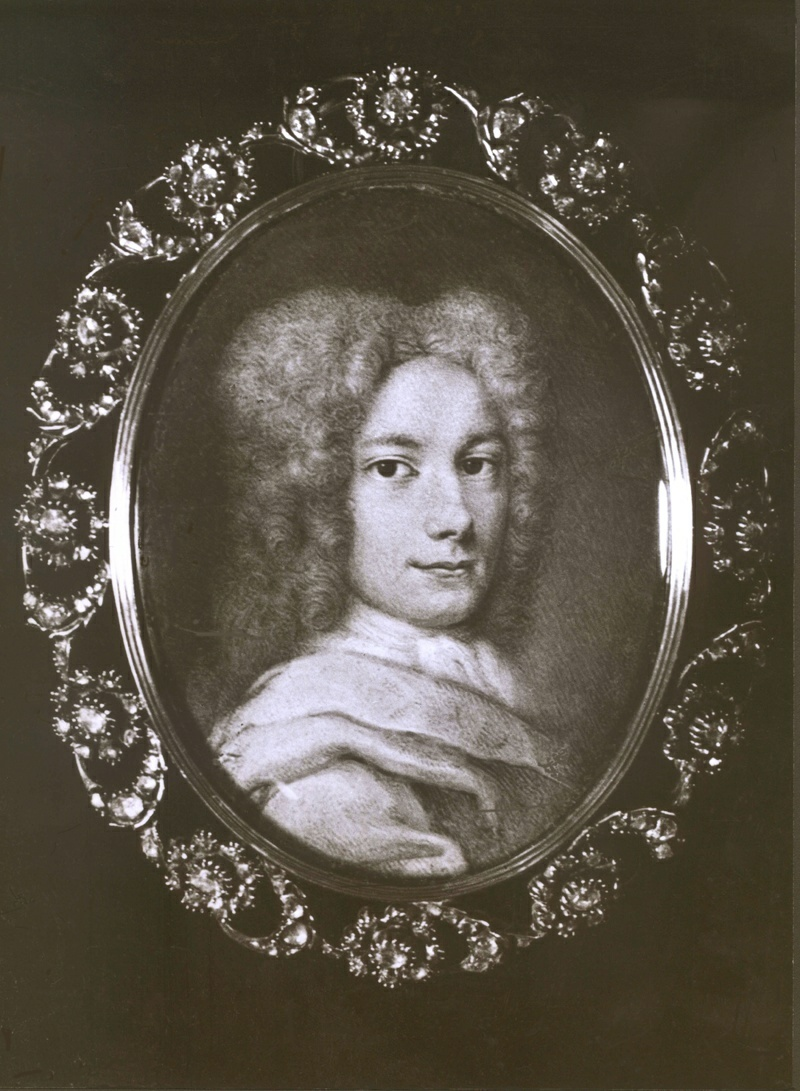
George Frideric Handel c. 1710

The Violin Sonata in D major (HWV 371) was composed (c. 1749-50) by George Frideric Handel, for violin and basso continuo. Other catalogues of Handel's music have referred to the work as HG xxvii,47; and HHA iv/4,28.

This sonata represents Handel's last piece of chamber music. The piece was not published by Walsh. The designation Opus 1 No.13 was first made in the Chrysander edition.

A typical performance of the work takes about 12 minutes.

== Movements ==
The work consists of four movements:

	Tempo	Notes
I	Affettuoso	This movement is in the key of D major with a time signature of common time. Its final cadence resolves to the dominant, leading into the following allegro. The first movement of the flute sonata in D major (HWV 378) borrows from the opening of this movement.
II	Allegro	This movement is in the key of D major with a time signature of common time
III	Larghetto	This movement is in the key of B minor with a time signature of 3/4. Its final cadence resolves to the dominant, leading into the following allegro.
IV	Allegro	This movement is in the key of D major with a time signature of 3/4. It is in binary form, more specifically, AABB.

== See also ==
- List of solo sonatas by George Frideric Handel
- XV Handel solo sonatas (publication by Chrysander)
