= Fitzwilliam Sonatas =

Sonatas by Thurston Dart, based on works by Handel

Portrait of George Frideric Handel by Balthasar Denner, c. 1726–28

Fitzwilliam Sonatas is the name first given by Thurston Dart to an arrangement he made, based on two recorder sonatas by George Frideric Handel, which he recast as a group of three sonatas. The term was applied by later editors to the original two sonatas as Handel wrote them, and was also expanded to encompass several other sonatas for various instruments included in the Handel autograph manuscripts held by the Fitzwilliam Museum in Cambridge.

== History ==
The two sonatas used by Dart for his edition were probably written between 1724 and 1726, but were not likely intended to be associated, either as a pair or together with the other four recorder sonatas by Handel. They were first associated in 1948, when Thurston Dart named them after the Fitzwilliam Museum at the University of Cambridge, where the autograph sources are kept. Said autographs were part of the bequest that founded the museum, made in 1816 by Richard FitzWilliam, 7th Viscount FitzWilliam (not related to the Earls Fitzwilliam), who had bought them at auction following the death of J.C. Smith the Younger (1712–95), from the portion of his collection remaining after a major gift to King George III.

In 1974 a new edition of three recorder sonatas under the same name was made by the German musicologist Klaus Hofmann. This edition restored the D minor sonata to its original seven-movement form, and added as no. 3 the Sonata in G major, HWV 358, probably composed much earlier than the other two Fitzwilliam recorder sonatas, at some time between 1707 and 1710. Even with correction of an evidently defective, very high passage at the end of the third movement, Hofmann admits that "Handel must have been counting on a superlative instrumental soloist", and suggests that "perhaps an instrument in g' ought also to be kept in mind" (as opposed to the usual alto recorder in f'). The attribution of this sonata to the recorder is contested, however. Both David Lasocki and Terence Best assign it to the violin, whereas Jean-Claude Veilhan endorses Hofmann's view, and Winfried Michel acknowledges the possibility.

Two further Handel sonatas found in the Fitzwilliam manuscripts have been published under the "Fitzwilliam" rubric: the Sonata for Violin and Continuo in G minor, HWV 364a, and the Sonata for Oboe and Continuo in B♭ major, HWV 357. In the autograph of the G minor violin sonata, Handel copied out the first bar a second time at the foot of the first page, with the solo part written an octave lower, in the alto clef and with the words "Per la Viola da Gamba". A realization of this version was first published in an edition by Thurston Dart in 1950.

== Movements ==
Fitzwilliam Sonatas
No. 1

No. 2

No. 3
All performed by Alex Murray (flute) and Martha Goldstein (harpsichord)

The three sonatas in Dart's arrangement (the one illustrated in the accompanying sound files) are:

- The Sonata in B♭ major (HWV 377, c. 1724–25)
1. Corrente
2. Adagio
3. Allegro
- Movements 7 & 6, reversed from their order in the Sonata in D minor (HWV 367a, Op. 1, No. 9a, c. 1725–26), (using an earlier version of movement 6, the Andante in D minor, HWV 409, c. 1725–26), and the Menuet in D minor (HWV 462, c. 1724–26, originally for solo keyboard), with the note values doubled and time signature changed from 6/8 to 3/4, to which is added a double (variation) composed by Dart.
1. A tempo di Menuet
2. Andante
3. Menuet
- Movements 1–5 from the Sonata in D minor (HWV 367a, c. 1725–26).
1. Largo
2. Vivace
3. Furioso
4. Adagio
5. Alla breve

The movements of Handel's two original sonatas, as given in both Klaus Hofmann's and David Lasocki and Walter Bergmann's editions, are:

- Sonata in B♭ major (HWV 377)
1. [Allegro]
2. Adagio
3. Allegro
- Sonata in D minor (HWV 367a)
1. Largo
2. Vivace
3. Furioso [Hofmann]; Presto [Lasocki/Bergmann]
4. Adagio
5. Alla breve
6. Andante
7. A tempo di menuet

The Sonata in G major (HWV 358) does not even carry the title "Sonata" in the manuscript, let alone any specification of instrumentation, nor are there any tempo markings for its three movements. The editions by Hofmann and Best, though disagreeing about the intended solo instrument (recorder or violin, respectively), do supply the same tempo markings:

1. [Allegro]
2. [Adagio]
3. [Allegro]

The Violin sonata in G minor (HWV 364a) is marked simply "Violino Solo" in the Fitzwilliam autograph. The movements as given in Terence Best's edition are:

1. Larghetto
2. Allegro
3. Adagio
4. Allegro

== Discussion ==
Handel re-used the first movement of Sonata 1, a courante, in the opera, Scipione (HWV 20, 1704). The second movement was re-used in his Organ Concerto in F major, Op. 4, No. 4 (HWV 292). The third movement was used in the Violin Sonata, Op. 1, No. 3 (HWV 361).

Modern scholars agree that the B♭ major sonata must have been written for the recorder, despite there being no mention of this on the autograph. One of the reasons for this is that, "when Handel used the third movement again in his A major violin sonata, he changed the key to A major, which would seem to eliminate the possibility that the B♭ major version is for the violin." In addition, the key and range were unsuitable for the oboe, according to one source, though another writer claims that, although "the key would be suitable for the oboe, but less so for the flute," nevertheless "The range is too high for the oboe, and all of Handel's genuine flute and oboe sonatas go significantly below f′ (flute sonatas to d′, oboe sonatas to c′ or d′)".

The second and third of Dart's sonatas were originally a single sonata (HWV 367a), and was broken into two parts by Thurston Dart in his edition of 1948. The sonata designated by Dart as No. 2 consists of movement 7 of this D minor sonata followed by an earlier version of movement 6 of the same work, concluding with an unrelated minuet by Handel, together with a double (variation) composed by Dart. It has since been published in its original form. This D-minor Sonata was later arranged by an unknown hand as a flute Sonata in B minor (HWV 367b), published by Walsh in about 1730 as op. 1, no. 9.

== See also ==
- List of compositions by George Frideric Handel
