= Flute Sonata in E minor (HWV 359b) =

Musical composition by G. F. Handel

Portrait of George Frideric Handel by Balthasar Denner, c. 1726–28

The Flute sonata in E minor (HWV 359b) was composed (c. 1724) by George Frideric Handel for flute and basso continuo. The work is also referred to as Opus 1 No. 1b, and was first published in 1732 by Walsh. Other catalogues of Handel's music have referred to the work as HG xxvii,6; and HHA iv/3,10.

The sonata was originally composed as a violin sonata in D minor (HWV 359a).

Of the two sonatas in the Chrysander edition as Opus 1 Sonata I, this one (Sonata I^{b}) is the one in the Walsh edition (where it is called Sonata I). Chrysander's Sonata I^{a} was compiled from manuscript sources. Chrysander's Sonata I^{a} and Sonata I^{b} have their first and fourth movements in common.

A typical performance of the work takes about seven minutes.

== Movements ==
The work consists of four movements:

	Tempo	Key	Meter	Bars	Recording (Al Goldstein on flute with Martha Goldstein on harpsichord)	Notes
I	Grave	E minor	4/4	20		In common with the first movement of the flute sonata in E minor (HWV 379).
II	Allegro	E minor	4/4	43		
III	Adagio	G major	3/4	12		Concludes on a B major chord.
IV	Allegro	E minor	3/8	80		Two sections (31 and 49 bars)—each with repeat markings. In common with the fourth movement of the flute sonata in E minor (HWV 379).

(Movements do not contain repeat markings unless indicated. The number of bars is taken from the Chrysander edition, and is the raw number in the manuscript—not including repeat markings.)

== See also ==
- Handel flute sonatas
- List of solo sonatas by George Frideric Handel
- XV Handel solo sonatas (publication by Chrysander)
- Handel solo sonatas (publication by Walsh)
