= Apollo e Dafne (Handel) =

1710 secular cantata by Handel

- Secular cantata by George Frideric Handel
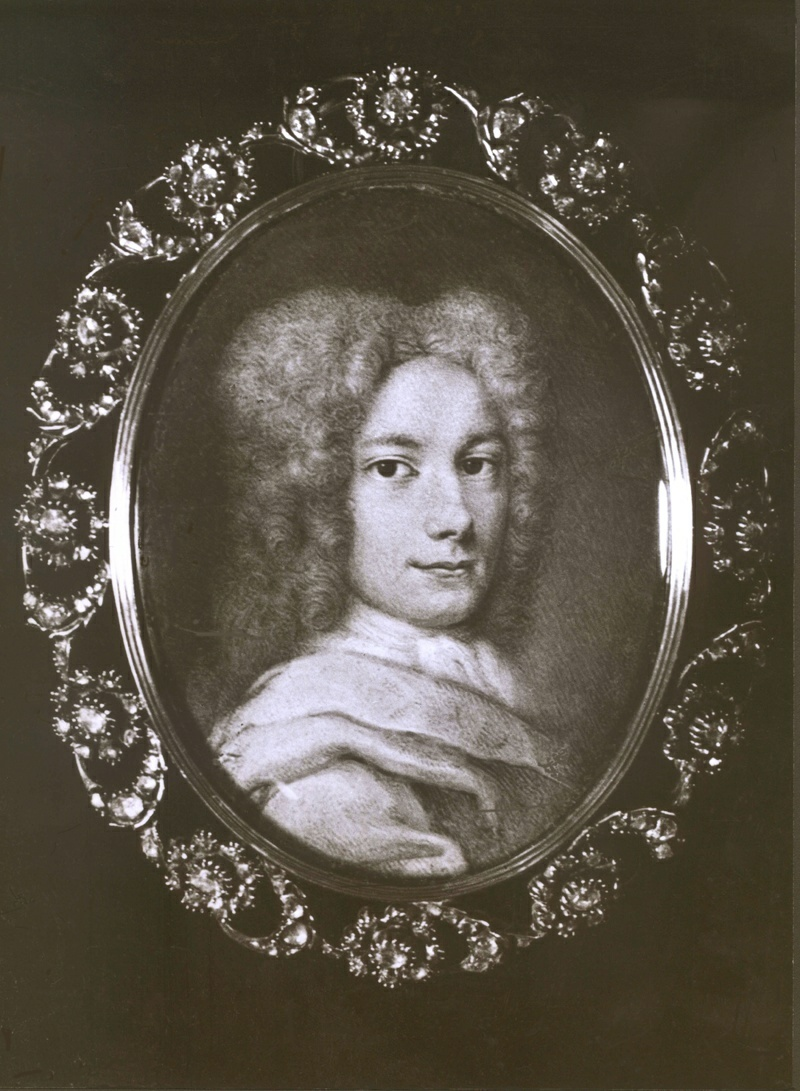
- Handel c. 1710
- Catalogue: HWV 122
- Year: 1709/10
- Language: Italian
- Based on: Daphne myth
- Movements: 20
- Scoring: soprano; bass; orchestra

Apollo e Dafne (Apollo and Daphne, HWV 122) is a secular cantata composed by George Frideric Handel in 1709–10. Handel began composing the work in Venice in 1709 and completed it in Hanover after arriving in 1710 to take up his appointment as Kapellmeister to the Elector, the later King George I of Great Britain. The work is one of Handel's most ambitious cantatas and is indicative of the brilliant operatic career to follow in the next 30 years of his life.

The work's overture has not survived and therefore another of the composer's instrumental works is sometimes performed as an introduction. The cantata's instrumentation is bright, as Handel adds a flute, a pair of oboes and a bassoon to the usual strings.

The work takes just over 40 minutes to perform.

== Synopsis ==
Apollo, having released Greece from tyranny by killing the menacing dragon Python, is in an arrogant mood. He boasts that even Cupid's archery is no match for his own bow and arrow. When he sees the lovely Daphne his conceit is shattered. He is instantly smitten and deploys all his charms to win her favour. Naturally distrustful, she rejects his advances and declares that she would rather die than lose her honour. Apollo becomes more forceful in insisting that she yield to his love and takes hold of her. When all seems lost, Daphne manages to escape from his grasp by transforming herself into a laurel tree. Overwhelmed by sorrow, Apollo pledges that his tears will water her green leaves and that her triumphant branches will be used to crown the greatest heroes.

== Dramatis personae ==
- Apollo (bass)
- Daphne (soprano)

== Text ==
In the following table, the first column has the movement number, the second the type of music, the third the role, and the fourth the text translated from the original Italian.

	type	role	text
I	Recitative	Apollo	The earth is set free! Greece is avenged! Apollo has conquered! After such terrors and such slaughter that have devastated and depopulated the country the Python lies dead, put to death by my hand. Apollo has triumphed! Apollo has conquered!
II	Aria	Apollo	The good of the universe relies on this saving bow. With my praises let the earth resound and sacrifices be prepared to my protecting arm.
III	Recitative	Apollo	Let Cupid in his pretty pride give way to the force of my arrows; let him boast no more of the fatal point of his golden arrows. One Python alone is worth more than a thousand ardent wounded lovers.
IV	Aria	Apollo	Break your bow and cast away your weapons, God of idleness and pleasure. How can you ever hurt me, naked spirit and blind archer?
V	Aria	Daphne	Most blest is this soul, that loves only freedom. There is not peace, there is no calm if the heart is not unfettered.
VI	Recitative	Apollo	What a voice! What a beauty! This sound, this sight pierces my heart. Nymph!
VI	Recitative	Daphne	What do I see, alas? And who is it that surprises me?
VI	Recitative	Apollo	I am a God, whom your beauty has aroused
VI	Recitative	Daphne	I know no other God in these woods but only Diana; do not come near, profane God.
VI	Recitative	Apollo	I am Cynthia's brother; If you love my sister, fair one, pity the one who adores you.
VII	Aria	Daphne	You burn, adore, and beg in vain; only to Cynthia am I faithful. To her brother's flames of love Cynthia would have me cruel.
VIII	Recitative	Apollo	How cruel!
VIII	Recitative	Daphne	How importunate!
VIII	Recitative	Apollo	I seek an end to my troubles.
VIII	Recitative	Daphne	And I shall survive it.
VIII	Recitative	Apollo	I am consumed with love
VIII	Recitative	Daphne	I am burning with anger.
IX	Duet	Apollo, Daphne	A war rages in my breast that I can bear no longer.
IX	Duet	Apollo	I burn, I freeze.
IX	Duet	Daphne	I fear, I suffer. If this ardour is not checked I can never have peace.
X	Recitative	Apollo	Be calm now, my dear one. The beauty that inflames me will not flower for ever; the fairest that Nature creates passes, and does not last.
XI	Aria	Apollo	As the rose with its thorn quickly comes and quickly goes, so with sudden flight, passes the flower of beauty.
XII	Recitative	Daphne	Ah! A God should follow after no other love than for objects eternal; the fleeting dust will perish, will end, that makes me pleasing to you, but not the virtue that protects me.
XIII	Aria	Daphne	As the benign star in the sky calms Neptune's fury, so in an honest and fair soul, reason holds love in check.
XIV	Recitative	Apollo	Hear my reason!
XIV	Recitative	Daphne	I am deaf!
XIV	Recitative	Apollo	A bear you are, a tigress!
XIV	Recitative	Daphne	You are no God!
XIV	Recitative	Apollo	Yield to love, or you will feel my force.
XIV	Recitative	Daphne	In my blood this ardour of yours will be quenched.
XV	Duet	Apollo	Ah! Soften that harsh severity.
XV	Duet	Daphne	To die is better than to lose my honour.
XV	Duet	Apollo	Ah! Cease your anger, O beloved of my heart.
XV	Duet	Daphne	To die is better than to lose my honour.
XVI	Recitative	Apollo	Always will I adore you!
XVI	Recitative	Daphne	Always will I abhor you!
XVI	Recitative	Apollo	You shall not escape me!
XVI	Recitative	Daphne	Yes, I will escape you!
XVI	Recitative	Apollo	I will follow you, run after you, fly in your steps: swifter that the sun you cannot be.
XVII	Aria	Apollo	Run, my feet: hold tight, my arms, the ungrateful beauty. I touch her, I hold her, I take her, I hold her tight... But what sudden change is this? What did I see? What behold? Heavens! Fate! Whatever is it!
XVIII	Recitative	Apollo	Daphne, where are you? I cannot find you. What new miracle has taken you away, changed you and hidden you? May the cold of winter never harm you nor the thunder of heaven touch your sacred and glorious foliage.
XIX	Aria	Apollo	Dear laurel, with my tears I shall water your green leaves; with your triumphant branches will I crown the greatest heroes. If I cannot hold you in my bosom, Daphne, at least on my brow will I wear you.
