= The Cuckoo and the Nightingale (concerto) =

Organ concerto

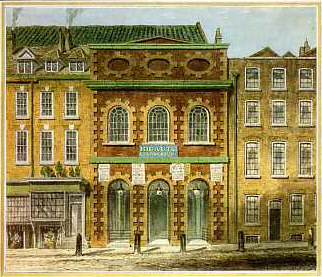
The King's Theatre where the concerto was first performed

The Cuckoo and the Nightingale, HWV 295, is an organ concerto in four movements by George Frideric Handel. The second movement uses bird song motifs corresponding to the birds of the title. The concerto premiered in London in 1739 as an interlude during the first performance of the composer's oratorio Israel in Egypt.

== Scoring ==
Handel wrote for a chamber organ without pedals and a small Baroque orchestra. As well as strings, the orchestra has oboes and a continuo section.

== Solo part ==
Handel was a gifted organist, and his organ concertos were a "draw" to his oratorios. Handel's organ playing supplied an element of virtuosity which was probably missing from the singing because his oratorios were written for less highly trained singers than the operas. We know that he would have improvised at the organ to some extent. As he got older and his eyesight deteriorated, he was less motivated to write the organ part in full. The scores of his organ concertos therefore came to contain more "ad libitum" bars for the soloist to improvise. In the case of the Cuckoo and the Nightingale the third movement is "organo ad libitum". Organists differ in their approach to this movement with George Malcolm's recording taking about a minute and Richard Egarr about three.

== Publication ==
Handel had already published a set of organ concertos, Op. 4, which when it appeared in 1738 was the first ever collection of keyboard concertos. The same publisher, John Walsh, brought out "The Cuckoo and the Nightingale" in 1740 as part of a second set (which bears no opus number). Later editions include that of the Händel-Gesellschaft, which published the concerto in 1894 as part of the composer's complete works.

== Related work ==
Handel reworked some of the material, including the bird calls, as a concerto grosso (No. 9, HWV 327) which Walsh published as one of a set of twelve.

== Discography ==
The Cuckoo and the Nightingale is one of Handel's better known organ concertos and has often been recorded. Among the organists who have recorded it are:

- Marie-Claire Alain with the Jean-François Paillard Chamber Orchestra
- George Malcolm with the Academy of St Martin in the Fields (1976)
- Simon Preston with the English Concert (1984)
- Richard Egarr with the Academy of Ancient Music (included as an extra item in a 2009 recording of Handel's organ concertos, Op. 7)
