= Queen Caroline Te Deum =

1774 canticle Te Deum in D major composed by George Frideric Handel

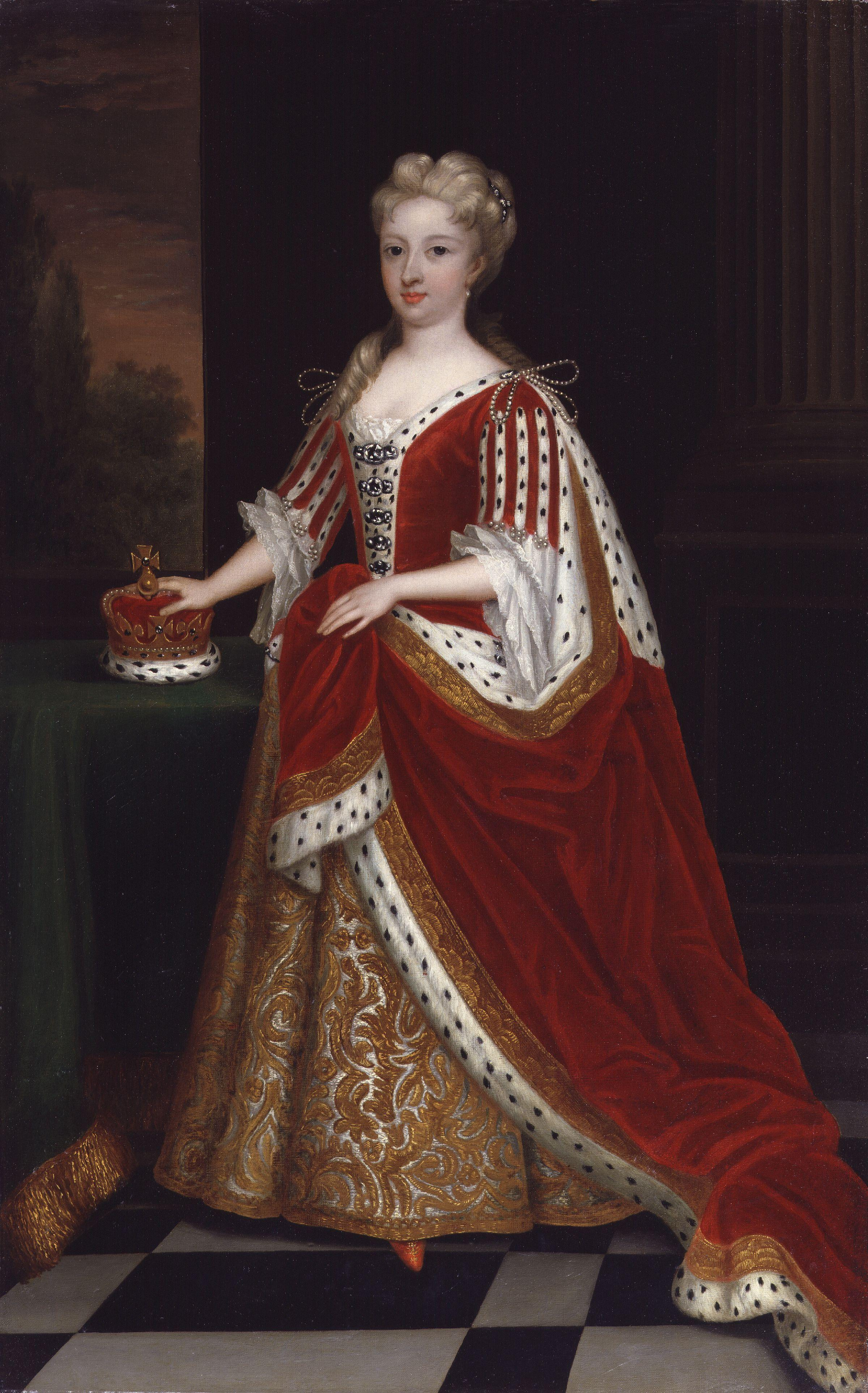
Caroline of Ansbach when Princess of Wales, painted by Sir Godfrey Kneller in 1716

The Te Deum in D major, "Queen Caroline" (HWV 280) is a canticle Te Deum in D major composed by George Frideric Handel in 1714.

== Background ==
When Queen Anne died in 1714, her second cousin the Elector of Hanover became King of Great Britain as George I. His daughter-in-law Caroline of Ansbach thus became Princess of Wales. Caroline left Hanover and traveled to Britain, making the only sea voyage she ever took in her life, and arrived at Margate in September 1714. Her safe arrival was celebrated by the composition of this Te Deum by Handel, who had been resident in London since 1712 and had composed a number of pieces for royal occasions.

The Te Deum was performed in the Chapel Royal of St. James's Palace in that same month, on the 26th, and again on 17 October. Since Caroline later became Queen as consort of George II, the Te Deum composed to give thanks for her safe arrival in Britain became known as the "Queen Caroline" Te Deum. George I attended the performance of the Te Deum and subsequently doubled Handel's "pension", or salary, he had been granted by Queen Anne of two hundred pounds a year for life to four hundred.

== Text and Structure ==
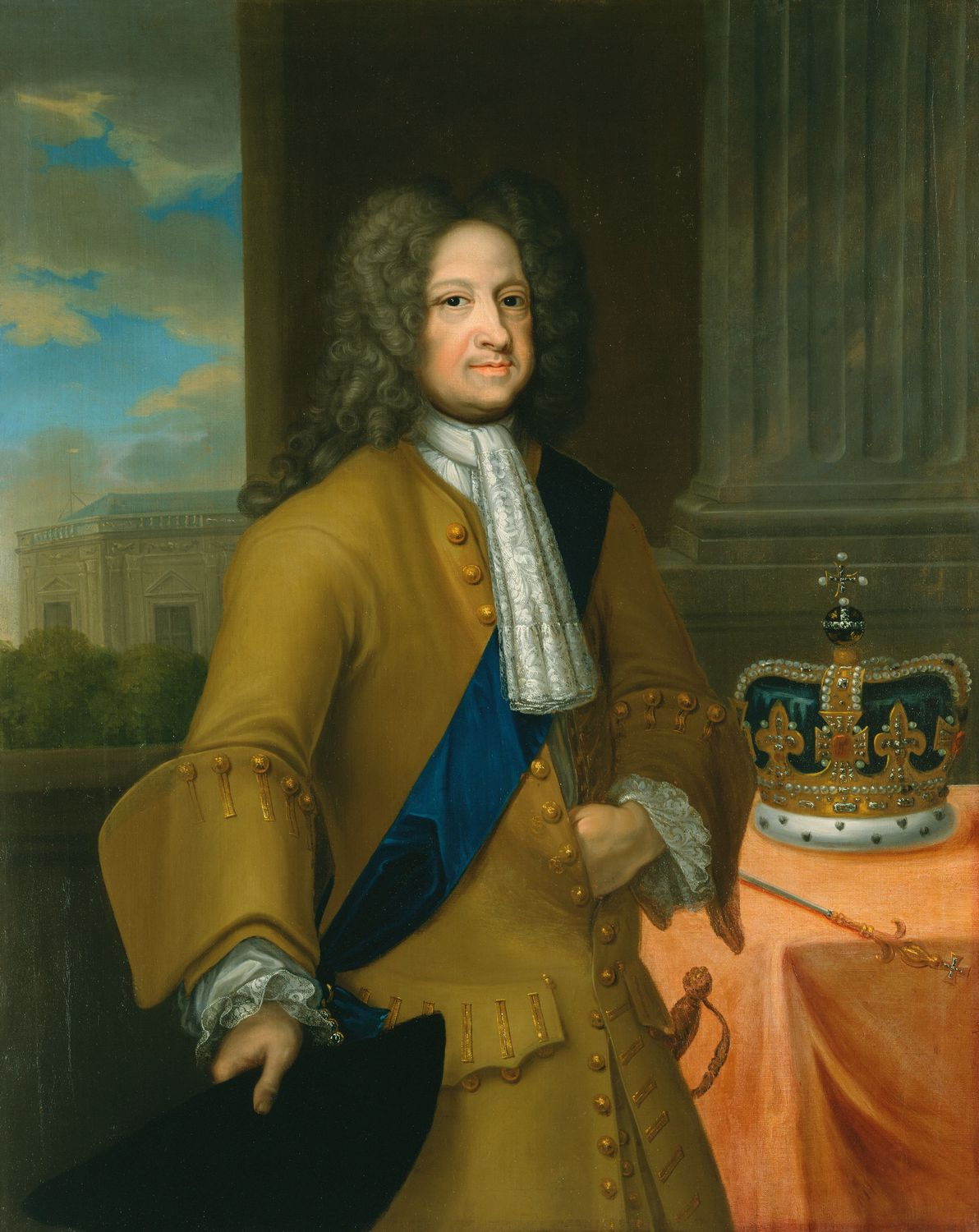
George I by Georg Wilhelm Lafontaine

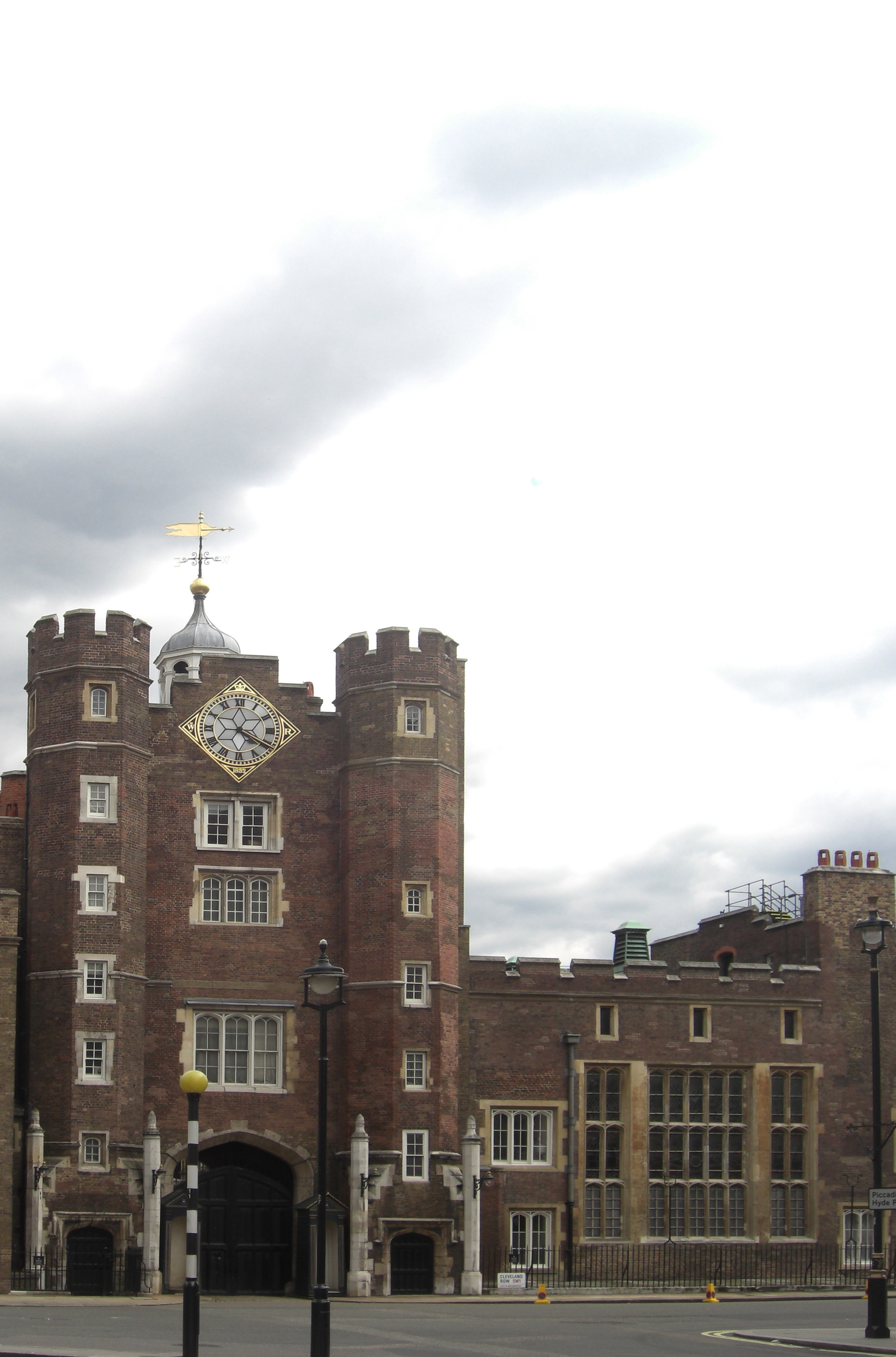
St James's Palace. The large window on the right is a window of the Chapel Royal

The work calls for six solo vocalists, chorus and instrumental ensemble including trumpet.

(Soloists, Chorus and Orchestra)

We praise thee, O Lord,
We acknowledge thee to be the Lord.
All the earth doth worship thee,
The Father everlasting.
To thee the angels cry aloud,
The heavens and all the powers therein.
To thee Cherubin and Seraphim continually cry:
Holy, holy, holy! Lord God of Sabaoth,
Heaven and earth are full of the majesty of thy glory.

(Tenor solo with orchestra, followed by chorus with orchestra, then bass soloist with orchestra)

The glorious company of the Apostles praise thee,
The goodly fellowship of the Prophets praise thee,
The holy church throughout all the world
Doth acknowledge thee,
The Father of an infinite majesty,
Thine honourable, true and only son,
Also the Holy Ghost the Comforter.
Thou art the King of Glory, O Christ,
Thou art the Everlasting Son of the Father.

(Alto solo with solo recorder and orchestra, joined by chorus)

When thou tookest upon thee to deliver man,
Thou didst not shun the Virgin's womb.
When thou had'st overcome the sharpness of death,
Thou did'st open the Kingdom of Heaven to all believers.
Thou sittest at the right hand of God
In the glory of the Father.
We believe that thou shalt come to be our Judge.
We therefore pray thee help our servants,
Whom thou has redeemed with thy precious blood.
Make them to be number'd with thy Saints in glory everlasting
O Lord, save thy people and bless thy heritage,
Govern them and lift them up forever.

(Soloists, chorus, solo trumpet and orchestra)

Day by day we magnify thee,
And we worship thy name for ever, world without end.

(Alto solo with orchestra)

Vouchsafe, O Lord, to keep us this day without sin,
O Lord, have mercy upon us,
O Lord, let thy mercy lighten upon us
As our trust is in thee.

(Chorus with solo trumpet and orchestra)

O Lord, in thee have I trusted,
Let me never be confounded.

== Musical style ==
Handel, a recent emigrant to Britain from Germany, studied the works of Henry Purcell in learning how to set English words to music. The section beginning "Vouchsafe, O Lord", shows a particular influence of Purcell, but the piece also includes the operatic style Handel used in the theatre, for instance in the alto aria with recorder, "When thou tookest upon thee."

== Recordings ==
- James Bowman (countertenor), John Mark Ainsley (tenor), Michael George (bass), New College Choir Oxford, The King's Consort, Robert King (conductor). Hyperion Records CDA66315. Released 1989.
- Graham Pushee (countertenor), Harry Van Berne (tenor), Harry van der Kamp (bass), Alsfelder Vokalensemble, Bremen Baroque Orchestra, Wolfgang Helbich conductor. Cpo Records 761203924424. Released 1995.
