= Utrecht Te Deum and Jubilate =

Choral composition by George Frideric Handel

- by George Frideric Handel
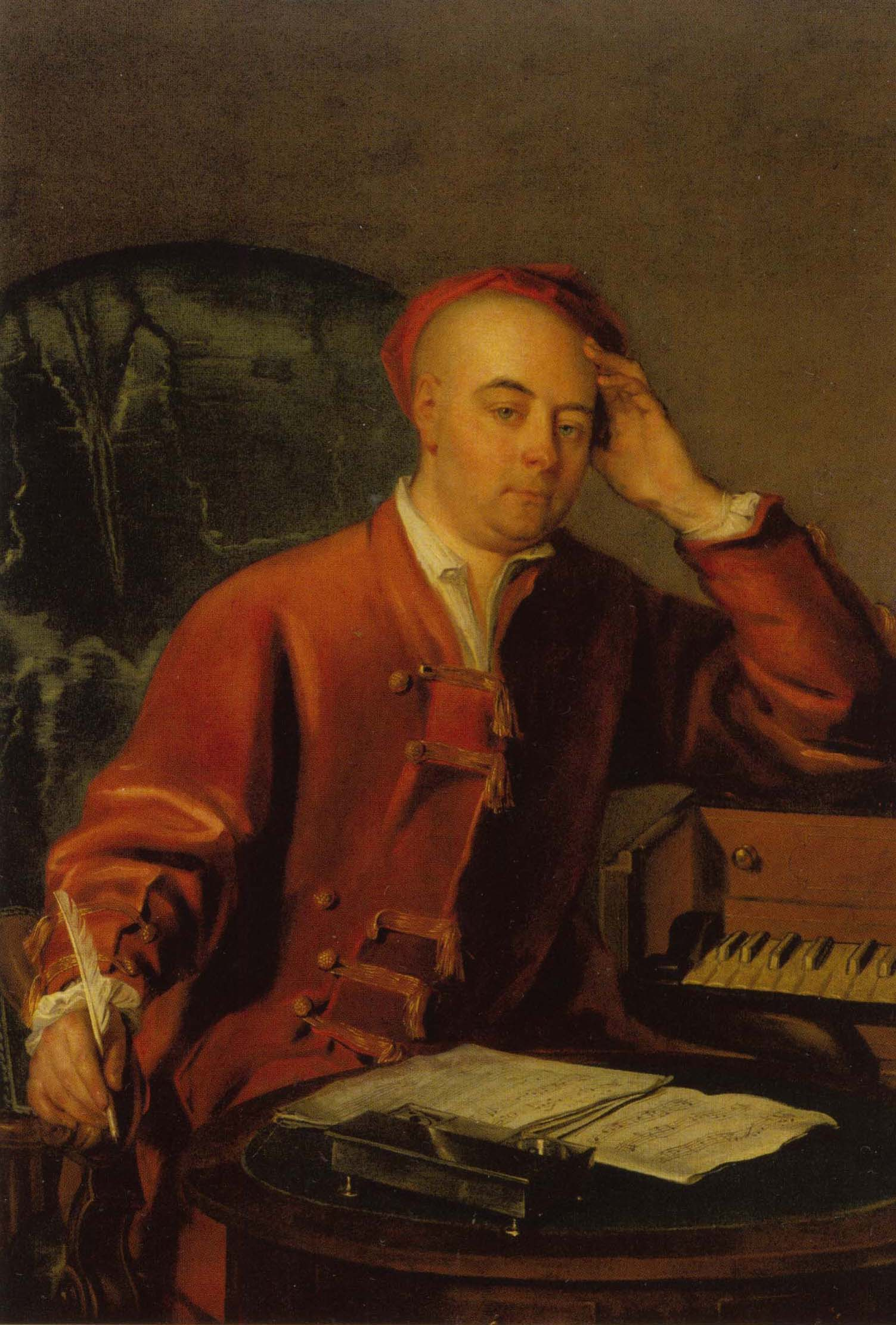
- George Frideric Handel (by Philip Mercier)
- Catalogue: HWV 278, 279
- Year: 1713
- Period: Baroque
- Genre: Sacred choral music
- Text: Te Deum; Psalm 100
- Language: English
- Performed: 13 July 1713: London St Paul's Cathedral
- Movements: 17 (10 + 7)
- Vocal: SSAATTBB choir, solo: 2 sopranos, 2 altos, tenor, bass
- Instrumental: 2 trumpets; timpani; flauto traverso; 2 oboes; bassoon; 3 violins; viola; cello; continuo

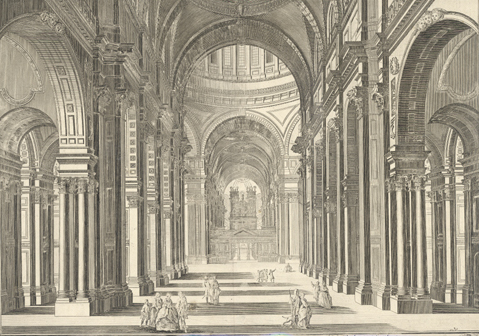
St Paul's Cathedral, 18th century

Utrecht Te Deum and Jubilate is the common name for a sacred choral composition in two parts, written by George Frideric Handel to celebrate the Treaty of Utrecht, which established the Peace of Utrecht in 1713, ending the War of the Spanish Succession. He composed a Te Deum, HWV 278, and a Jubilate Deo (Psalm 100), HWV 279. The combination of the two texts in English follows earlier models. The official premiere of the work was on 13 July 1713 in a service in St Paul's Cathedral in London.

== History ==
Handel's composition was written to celebrate the Peace of Utrecht in 1713. It has been described as his first commission from the British royal family, although the Ode for the Birthday of Queen Anne appears to be earlier. It was his first major sacred work to English texts. Handel followed the models of Henry Purcell's 1694 Te Deum and Jubilate with strings and trumpets, which was regularly performed for official functions in St Paul's even after the composer's death, and a 1709 setting by William Croft. As in these models, Handel composed a combination of two liturgical texts, the Ambrosian Hymn Te Deum, We praise thee, O God, and a setting of Psalm 100, O be joyful in the Lord, all ye lands, which is a regular canticle of the Anglican Morning Prayer. He followed the version of the Book of Common Prayer. Handel's work was first performed in a public rehearsal on 5 March 1713 in St Paul's Cathedral. The official premiere took place after the tedious peace negotiations had finished, in a solemn thanksgiving service on 7 July 1713.

The Te Deum and Jubilate, along with another composition As Pants the Hart, earned Handel a yearly income from Queen Anne's Court. Donald Burrows writes in "Handel and the English Chapel Royal" that "his close association with the Court, reinforced by his musical contribution to events that were personal to the royal family, gave him both the benefits and the disadvantages of identification with the Hanoverian establishment." However, at the time his annual pension was granted it would not have been obvious that he was going to continue to enjoy the favour of the future George I, who was in fact opposed to the Treaty of Utrecht.

Handel arranged the Jubilate in about 1717/18 for the Duke of Chandos. Te Deum and Jubilate was performed in St Paul's for the annual Festival of the Sons of the Clergy, alternating with Purcell's work, until 1743 when Handel's Dettingen Te Deum was first performed.

Utrecht Te Deum and Jubilate was first published in full score during the 1730s. It was published by the Deutsche Händelgesellschaft in 1870 in Leipzig as HWV 278 and 279 in the attempted complete edition of Handel's works. Friedrich Chrysander edited it as volume 31 of "G.F. Händel's Werke: Ausgabe der Deutschen Händelgesellschaft", titled Utrechter Te Deum und Jubilate, with the texts in both English and German. Chrysander mentions in his preface a score published in 1731 by John Walsh: Te Deum and Jubilate, for Voices and Instruments performed before the Sons of the Clergy at the Cathedral-Church of St. Paul. Compos'd by George Frederick Handel. London. Printed for & sold by John Walsh.

Utrecht Te Deum and Jubilate has been published by Bärenreiter in the Hallische Händel-Ausgabe (HHA). The movement numbers below follow this critical edition.

== Scoring and structure ==
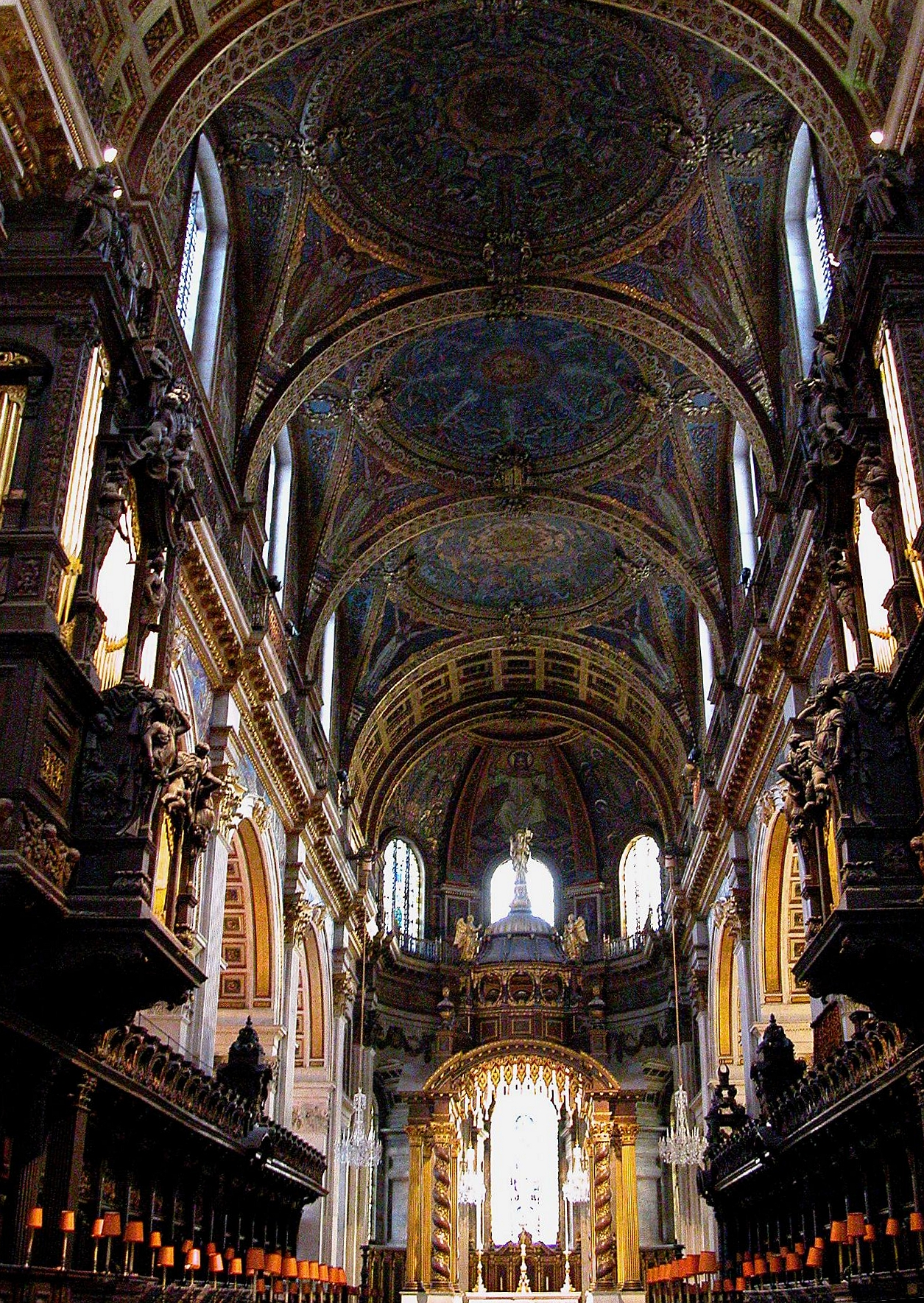
St Paul's Cathedral, interior facing east

The work is festively scored for six soloists (two sopranos, two altos, tenor and bass), mixed choir, two trumpets, flauto traverso, two oboes, bassoon, strings (three violins, viola, cello), and basso continuo. The choir is in five parts (SSATB) for most of the movements, but occasionally alto and tenor are divided as the soprano; the final doxology begins in eight parts. Almost all movements are set for solo singers and chorus; there are no arias. In modern performances, the number of soloists is typically reduced to four.

=== Te Deum ===
1. We praise Thee, O God (Adagio, SATB)
2. To Thee all Angels cry aloud (Largo e staccato, 2 altos, TB unison)
3. To Thee Cherubin and Seraphim (Andante, 2 sopranos, SSATB)
4. The glorious Company of the Apostles (Andante – Adagio – Allegro – adagio – Allegro, tenor, bass, two sopranos, SSATB)
5. When thou took’st upon thee to deliver man (Adagio – allegro – adagio – Allegro, SSATB)
6. We believe that thou shalt come to be our judge (Largo, soprano, alto, tenor, bass, SATB)
7. Day by day we magnify thee (Allegro, double choir: SST AATB)
8. And we worship thy name (SSATB)
9. Vouchsafe, O Lord (Adagio, SSAATB)
10. O Lord, in thee have I trusted (Allegro, SSATB)

=== Jubilate ===
1. O be joyful in the Lord, all ye lands (alto, SATB)
2. Serve the Lord with gladness (SSATB)
3. Be ye sure that the Lord he is God (duet: alto, bass, violin, oboe)
4. O go your way into his gates (SATB, strings)
5. For the Lord is gracious (Adagio: 2 altos, bass, oboes, violins)
6. Glory be to the Father (SSAATTBB)
7. As it was in the beginning (SSATB)

== Music ==
Handel could rely on the trained musicians of the Chapel Royal who were able to sing solo. Unlike in his operas, he set the work mostly for choir, divided in a double choir for Day by day we magnify thee and divided in eight parts for the homophon Glory be to the Father.

In the Te Deum, Handel inserted short solos to achieve a variety of textures as in a concerto grosso, to express the words. In movement 2, the two alto soloists begin together "To Thee all Angels cry aloud" on a base of three times "the heavn and all the pow'rs therein" in unison octaves of the choir. In movement 3, the announcement "To Thee Cherubin and Seraphim continually do cry" is rendered by two sopranos, whereas the full choir enters the homophon statement "Holy, holy, holy". Similarly, in movement 4 a tenor soloist sings of the "glorious Company of the Apostles", the bass soloist continues "the goodly fellowship", then the soprano soloists' "The noble army of martyrs praise Thee" leads to a tutti "The holy church", the movement culminates in an adagio on the words "The father of an infinite majesty" and concludes in runs in imitation on the word "glory". The beginning of movement 5 has been compared to Renaissance music: an alto soloist refers to "the Virgin's womb", the following "sharpness of death" is expressed by four soloists a cappella, contrasted by the choir's "Thou didst open the Kingdom of heav'n". Handel signed the last page of the Te Deum by SDG (Soli Deo Gloria – To the only God glory).

In the Jubilate, only the first movement is for solo and choir, an alto soloist, who exposes a coloratura theme, which the choir repeats. Movement 1 is adapted from "Laudate Pueri" which Handel composed for his Carmelite Vespers in Rome. Movement 3 is an introspective duet of alto and bass solo, with solo oboe and violin, based on the first movement of Handel's A mirarvi io son intento (HWV 178), composed in 1711 in Hanover. In movement 5 three low voices expand on For the Lord is gracious. All other movements are set for the choir.

== Recordings ==
- Bach: Magnificat; Handel: Utrecht Te Deum / Harnoncourt, Nikolaus Harnoncourt, Arnold Schoenberg Choir, Concentus Musicus Wien, Felicity Palmer, Marjana Lipovsek, Philip Langridge, Kurt Equiluz, Ludwig Baumann, Teldec 1996
- Handel: Utrecht Te Deum & Jubilate, Christopher Hogwood, Decca 1998
- Music for St Paul's, John Scott, St Paul's Cathedral Choir, The Parley of Instruments, Sophie Daneman, Julia Gooding, Robin Blaze, Rogers Covey-Crump, Mark Le Brocq, Andrew Dale Forbes, DISCID 1998
- Vivaldi: Gloria, Handel Utrecht Te Deum and Jubilate, Simon Preston, Christ Church Cathedral Choir, Oxford, Academy of Ancient Music, Emma Kirkby, Judith Nelson, Carolyn Watkinson, Charles Brett, Rogers Covey-Crump, Paul Elliott, David Thomas, L'Oiseau-Lyre
- Treaty of Utrecht, Jos van Veldhoven, Netherlands Bach Society, Nicki Kennedy, William Towers, Wolfram Lattke, Julian Podger, Peter Harvey, Channel Classics Records 2010

== Bibliography ==
- Christian Bährens: Händels Utrechter Te Deum – Geschichte – Musik – Interpretation, Unibuch Verlag, Lüneburg (2013), ISBN 978-3-934900-12-7 German
