= Un'alma innamorata =

1707 cantata by G. F. Handel

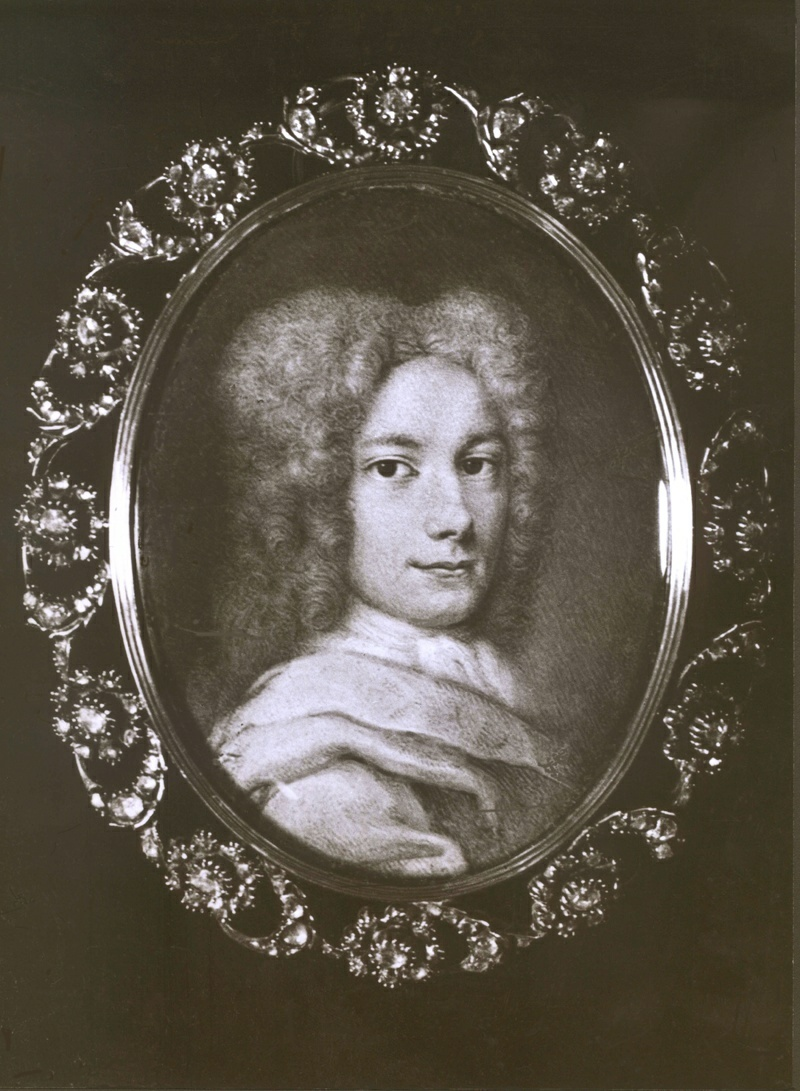
Händel c. 1710

Un'alma innamorata (HWV 173) is a dramatic secular cantata for soprano and instruments written by George Frideric Handel in 1707. Other catalogues of Handel's music have referred to the work as HG liiB,92; and HHA v/5,97. The title of the cantata translates as "A soul in love".

== History ==
The work was written for Ruspoli for performance at his country estate in Vignanello (near Rome). The copyist's bill is dated 30 June 1707. It is possible that the soprano part was composed for the singer Vittoria Tarquini (with whom Handel is rumoured to have had a relationship), and it is known that Vittoria was among the guests at the estate in Vignanello around the time of composition. Although uncertain, the text of the cantata may have been written by Abbé Francesco Mazziotti (who was the tutor of Ruspoli's eldest son).

== Synopsis ==
Even though the work is performed by a female voice, the text does not reveal whether the "voice" of the text is male or female. The text relates that a heart which is faithful in love becomes angry when it is wounded by love, however the singer is happy because it loves more than one heart and spurns the harsh laws and rigours of love (as defined by Cupid).

== Structure ==
The work is scored for violin and keyboard (with occasional figured bass markings in the second movement). The cantata contains three recitative-aria pairings.

A typical performance of the work takes about fifteen and a half minutes.

== Movements ==
The work consists of six movements:

	Type	Key	Meter	Tempo	Bars	Text (Italian)	Text (English)	Notes
I	Recitative		4/4		8	Un'alma innamorata, prigioniera d'amore, vive troppo infelice. Divien sempre maggiore il mal, che non intende, allor che nell'amar schiava si rende.	A soul in love, a prisoner of love, lives too miserably. The pain which it does not understand becomes more and more, once it becomes a slave in loving.	
II	Aria	D minor	3/8		140	Quel povero core, ferito d'amore sospira, se adira, se vive fedel. Sia il solo dolore geloso timore, le pene e catene martire crudel.	The poor heart wounded by love, sighs and becomes angry if it lives faithfully. Let its only pain be jealous fear, and let cruel torments be its chains.	Includes a "Da Capo", "Fine" instruction.
III	Recitative		4/4		7	E pur benche egli veda morta del suo servir, la speme istessa, vuole col suo languir, viver con essa.	And even though hope lies dead from its service [of love], its languishing must be lived with.	
IV	Aria	F major	4/4	Allegro	77	Io godo, rido e spero ed amo più d'un core e so ridir perché. Se segue il mio pensiero un vagabondo amore cercate voi dov'è.	I enjoy, laugh and hope, and love more than one heart, and I know why. If my thought follows a vagabond love, then you go and find where it is.	Includes a "Da Capo", "Fine" instruction.
V	Recitative		4/4		5	In quanto a me, ritrovo del riso ogni diletto, se sprezzo dell'amore le sue severe leggi, ed il rigore.	As for me, I find the delight of laughter, if I spurn the harsh laws and rigours of love.	
VI	Aria	B♭ major	3/8		37	Ben impari come se ama in amor chi vuol goder. Non ha pari alla mia brama il rigor del nume arcier.	Let he who wants to rejoice in love learn how one goes about loving. The severity of the archer-god is not equal to my desire.	Three sections (8, 8 and 21 bars)—each with repeat markings. Concludes in F major. The jaunty syncopated rhythms depicts independence of the singer from Cupid. The tempo is like a sarabande (a triple-time dance with a strong second beat); with the violin and the singer in unison.

(Movements do not contain repeat markings unless indicated. The number of bars is the raw number in the manuscript—not including repeat markings. The above is taken from volume 52B, starting at page 92, of the Händel-Gesellschaft edition.)

== See also ==
- List of cantatas by George Frideric Handel
