= Aure soavi e lieti (Handel) =

Cantata by George Frideric Handel

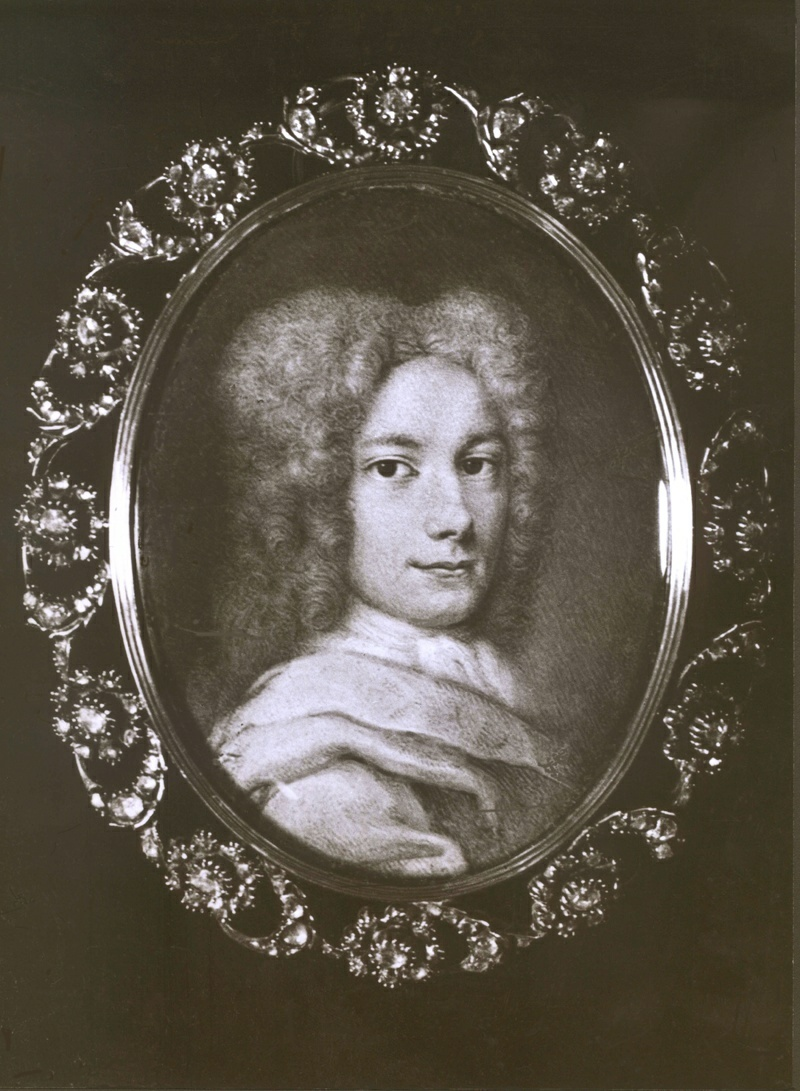
Händel c. 1710

Aure soavi e liete (HWV 84) ("Soft and Delightful Breezes") is a Baroque dramatic secular cantata in the key of E-flat major composed by George Frideric Handel in 1707 while he was serving as Kapellmeister to the Ruspoli family in Rome. The author of the text is unknown. Other catalogues of Handel's music have referred to the work as HG l,12 (there is no HHA designation of the work). The cantata is scored for solo soprano voice and basso continuo. It is divided into four separate movements with a typical performance lasting approximately seven and a half minutes.

== Background ==
Handel composed Aure soavi e lieti while a guest of the Francesco Maria Marescotti Ruspoli during his sojourn in Italy. The copyist's bill to Ruspoli for the score is dated 16 May 1707. However, Burrows has proposed that its first performance may have been in March of that year at the Palazzo Ruspoli in Cerveteri.

According to Mainwaring, Handel had traveled to Italy in 1706 at the invitation of Ferdinando de' Medici. Other sources say Handel was invited by Gian Gastone de' Medici, whom Handel had met in 1703–1704 in Hamburg. De' Medici, who had a keen interest in opera, was trying to make Florence Italy's musical capital by attracting the leading talents of his day.

In 1707, Handel arrived in Rome where for two years he was a guest of Ruspoli, who made him his Kapellmeister. During this period, Handel also composed the antiphon Salve Regina (HWV 241) which was performed in the Ruspoli Castle in Vignanello and the secular cantata Diana Cacciatrice (HWV 79) which was performed at the Palazzo Ruspoli in Cerveteri. His 1707 oratorios La Resurrezione (HWV 47) and Il trionfo del tempo e del disinganno (HWV 46a), both dedicated to Francesco Maria Marescotti Ruspoli, were performed in Rome at the palaces of the Ruspoli and Ottoboni families. Handel remained in Italy until 1710. Antonio Caldara succeeded him as Kapellmeister to the Ruspoli family in 1709.

== Structure ==
The work is scored for solo soprano and keyboard (with scattered figured bass markings). The cantata contains two recitative-aria pairings.

== Movements ==
The work consists of four movements:

	Type	Key	Meter	Tempo	Bars	Text (Italian)	Text (English)	Notes
I	Recitative		4/4		17	Aure soavi e liete, ombre notturne e chete, voi dall'estivo ardore, dolci ne difendete. Ma non trova il mio core, nel suo cocente ognor loco amoroso, chi lo difenda o chi gli dia riposo. onde fra voi solingo di parlar a colei che pur non m'ode, aure soavi, ombre notturene io fingo.	Soft and delightful breezes, silent night shadows, from the summer heat, you give sweet relief. But my heart cannot find, in its ever-burning loving core, the one who will defend it or give it rest. alone among you I pretend speaking to her who does not hear me, gentle breezes, night shadows.	
II	Aria	E♭ major	4/4	Adagio	21	Care luci, che l'alba rendete quand'a me cosi belle apparite voi nel cor mille fiamme accendete, ma pietà dell'ardor non sentite.	Dear eyes, that brings the dawn when so beautiful you appear to me you light a thousand flames in my heart, but you do not feel pity.	The key signature is written with only two flats, and A♭s have been written in as accidentals. The opening musical phrase ("Care luci") hangs on an arched melody that Handel also used in his opera Rodrigo, as well as in Messiah ("Comfort ye my people").
III	Recitative		4/4		8	Pietà, Clori, pietà! se quel che pietà sia dentro al tuo cor si sà, deh! fa che l'alma mia veda e conosca a prova che la pietà nel tuo bel cor si trova.	Pity, Clori, pity! if that which pity is known inside your heart, pray! make my soul see and experience the proof that pity exists in your beautiful heart.	
IV	Aria	G minor	3/8		34	Un aura flebile, un ombra mobile sperar mi fa, che Clori amabile nell'alma nobile senta pietà.	A gentle breeze, a passing shadow gives me hope, that lovely Clori in her noble soul feel pity.	Three sections (6, 8 and 20 bars)—the first two with repeat markings. Includes a "Da Capo", "Fine" instruction.

(Movements do not contain repeat markings unless indicated. The number of bars is the raw number in the manuscript—not including repeat markings. The above is taken from volume 50, starting at page 12, of the Händel-Gesellschaft edition.)

== See also ==
- List of cantatas by George Frideric Handel
