= Tra le fiamme (Il consiglio) =

1707 cantata by G. F. Handel

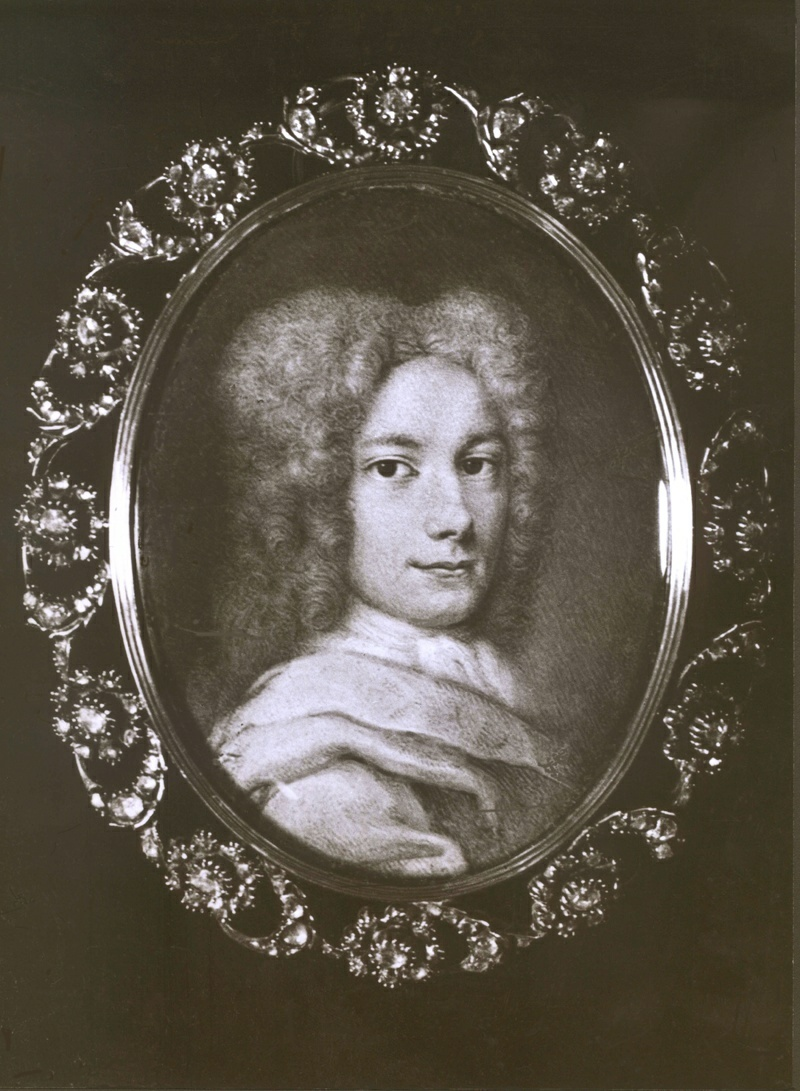
Händel c. 1710

Tra le fiamme (Il consiglio) (HWV 170) is a dramatic secular cantata for soprano and instruments written by George Frideric Handel in 1707. Other catalogues of Handel's music have referred to the work as HG liiB,66; and HHA v/5,55. The title of the cantata translates as "In flames (Counsel)".

== History ==
The text for the work was written by Cardinal Benedetto Pamphili. The payment on 6 July 1707 (recorded in Pamphili's account books) for the copying of a large cantata probably refers to Tra le fiamme.

== Synopsis ==
Using the analogy of butterflies attracted to a flame, and the story of Daedalus (who constructed wings made from wax and feathers for himself and his son Icarus), Pamphili uses the cantata to issue a warning to his audience: that the phoenix can rise from the flames, however the butterflies will be killed. It is possible that the cardinal was also directing the warning specifically to Handel, as there was a rumour at the time about a relationship between Handel (then twenty-two) and the singer Vittoria Tarquini (who was the mistress of Prince Ferdinand de' Medici of Florence).

== Structure ==
The work is scored for two recorders (flauto), oboes (hautbois), two violins, viola da gamba, a "Violone Grosso" (as specified in Handel's autograph) and, as customary practice in the 18th century, a harpsichord. The work is notable for having a virtuoso part for the viola da gamba. The cantata begins with an aria followed by two recitative-aria pairings, after which a final recitative is performed before an instruction to repeat ("Da Capo") the cantata's opening aria (an unusual feature in Handel cantatas).

A typical performance of the work takes about seventeen and a half minutes.

== Movements ==
The work consists of seven movements (with the final movement being a partial repeat of the first):

	Type	Key	Meter	Tempo	Bars	Text (Italian)	Text (English)	Notes
I	Aria	G major	3/8		163	Tra le fiamme tu scherzi per gioco, O mio core, per farti felice, e t'inganna una vaga beltà. Cadon mille farfalle nel foco, e si trova una sola fenice, che risorge se a morte sen va.	Among the flames you playfully dart, O my heart, to make you happy, and are deceived by a fine beauty. A thousand butterflies fall into the fire, but there is only one phoenix, which rises from death.	Two sections (116 and 47 bars)—without repeat markings. Includes a "Da Capo", "Fine" instruction.
II	Recitative		4/4		17	Dedalo già le fortunate penne tessea con mano ardita e con tenera cera piuma a piuma aggiungea. Icaro, il fanciulletto sovente confondea l'ingegnoso lavoro; Ah, cosi mai trattato non avesse e cera e piume: Per chi non nacque augello il volare è portento, il cader è costume.	Daedalus once, with crafty hands weaved fortunate wings out of soft wax to which feather to feather is added. Icarus, the young child confused the cunning work; Ah, so he should never have treated wax and feathers in this way: For those not born a bird, flying is a miracle and falling is customary.	
III	Aria	D major	4/4		43	Pien di nuovo e bel diletto, sciolse l'ali il giovinetto, e con l'aure già scherzando. Ma del volo sì gradito troppo ardito l'onda ancor va mormorando.	Full of new and lovely enjoyment, the young boy melted the wings, while darting in the breezes. But the flight so pleasing but too bold is still talked about by the murmuring waves.	Two sections (32 and 11 bars)—without repeat markings. Includes a "Da Capo", "Fine" instruction.
IV	Recitative		4/4		5	Sì, sì purtroppo è vero: nel temerario volo molti gl'Icari son, Dedalo un solo.	Yes, yes it is unfortunately true: there are many flying daringly like Icarus, but only one Daedalus.	
V	Aria	A minor	4/4		46	Voli per l'aria chi può volare scorra veloce la terra il mare parta, ritorni né fermi il piè. Voli ancor l'uomo ma coi pensieri che delle piume ben più leggeri e più sublimi il ciel gli diè.	Fly through the air whoever wishes to do so rushing through land and sea, starting and stopping without returning to the foot. Man may fly, but with thoughts far lighter and sublime than the wings that heaven gave him.	Includes a "Da Capo", "Fine" instruction.
VI	Recitative		4/4		7	L'uomo che nacque per salire al cielo, ferma il pensier nel suolo e poi dispone il volo con ali che si finge, e in sé non ha.	The man born to ascend to heaven, leaves his thoughts on the ground, and then has flight with pretend wings, that he was not born with.	
VII	Aria	G major	3/8		(116)			A "Da Capo" repeat of the cantata's opening aria.

(Movements do not contain repeat markings unless indicated. The number of bars is the raw number in the manuscript—not including repeat markings. The above is taken from volume 52B, starting at page 66, of the Händel-Gesellschaft edition.)

== See also ==
- List of cantatas by George Frideric Handel
