= Del bell'idolo mio =

1707–1709 cantata by Georg Frideric Handel

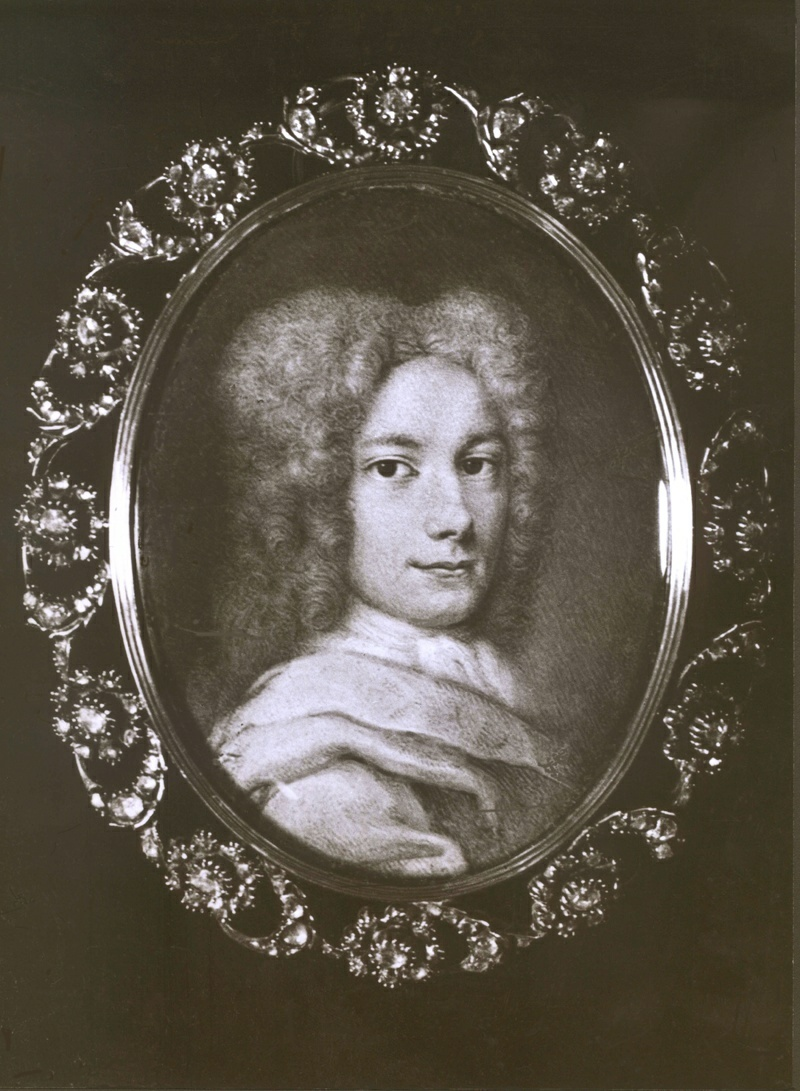
Händel c. 1710

Del bell'idolo mio (HWV 104) is a dramatic secular cantata for soprano written by Georg Frideric Handel in 1707–09. Other catalogues of Handel's music have referred to the work as HG l,48 (there is no HHA designation of the work). The title of the cantata translates as "Of my beautiful idol".

== History ==
The copyist's bill for Ruspoli is dated 31 August 1709, however there is no evidence that Handel was still in Rome at that time. Some aspects of the manuscript connect the cantata with others that were written in the spring of 1707.

== Synopsis ==
The cantata describes the quest of the singer as he ventures into the Underworld to rescue the soul of his beloved Nice.

== Structure ==
The work is scored for solo soprano and keyboard (with scattered figured bass markings). The cantata contains three recitative-aria pairings.

A typical performance of the work takes almost eleven minutes.

== Movements ==
The work consists of six movements:

	Type	Key	Meter	Tempo	Bars	Text (Italian)	Text (English)	Notes
I	Recitative	B minor	4/4		14	Del bell'idolo mio quest'e la fragil sua terrena salma. Per rintracciar quell'alma scenderò d'Acheronte al tenebroso lago; quell'adorato imago mi sarà cinosura in fra gl'abissi. Corri, corri a morir, misero amante, che la mortal sentenza io già la fluminai, e già la scrissi.	That's the fragile, earthly body of my beautiful idol. To find her soul I will descend to the dark lake of Acheron; the image I worshipped will be my guiding light in the abyss. Run, run away to die, miserable lover, since the deadly decision I have already made, and written.	The recitative sets the scene of despair (in a minor key) and tells of the journey ahead.
II	Aria	E minor	4/4	Andante	35	Formidabil gondoliero, io ti bramo, approda alla riva. Nel varcare il temuto sentiero un certo diletto mi nasce nel petto, che l'ama ravviva.	Formidable ferryman, I want you, approach the river bank. While crossing the dreaded border, a certain delight is born in my breast, that revives my love.	Includes a "Da Capo", "Fine" instruction. The aria depicts bravado and calls on the ferryman with a sustained note. His impatience in waiting is depicted with rhythmic repetition.
III	Recitative		4/4		4	Ma se non la rinvengo là nello stigio regno, misero, oh! che farò?	But if I do not find her in the Stygian kingdom, misery, oh! what will I do?	Concludes with a D major chord.
IV	Aria	G minor	4/4	Adagio	22	Piangerò, ma le mie lacrime saran simboli di fe. Quando piange un'alma forte, sol nel regno della morte, si lusinga aver mercé.	I will cry, but my tears are symbols of faith. When a strong soul cries, even in the kingdom of death, it hopes to find mercy.	Includes a "Da Capo", "Fine" instruction. Fragmentation and melancholic chromaticism express his despair and fear that he will not succeed.
V	Recitative		4/4		6	Fra quell'orride soglie, tutto festante, si raggira il piede olocausto d'amor, e della fede.	Over those horrid thresholds, all jubilant, one wanders into a holocaust of love and faith.	
VI	Aria	B♭ major	3/8		44	Su rendetemi colei, consolata un infelice, cari numi, amati dei, voglio Nice. Tanto tregua al duol interno! Dalle fiamme dell'inferno sorgerò nova fenice. Voglio Nice.	Return her to me, console an unhappy soul, dear spirits, beloved gods, I want Nice. Give respite to the pain inside! From the flames of the inferno will rise a new phoenix. I want Nice.	Two sections (16 and 28 bars)—each with repeat markings. With nothing left, he is reduced to a simple plea (as one long musical sigh): "I want Nice".

(Movements do not contain repeat markings unless indicated. The number of bars is the raw number in the manuscript—not including repeat markings. The above is taken from volume 50, starting at page 48, of the Händel-Gesellschaft edition.)

== See also ==
- List of cantatas by George Frideric Handel
