= Oboe Concerto No. 3 (Handel) =

1704-1705 composition by George Frideric Handel

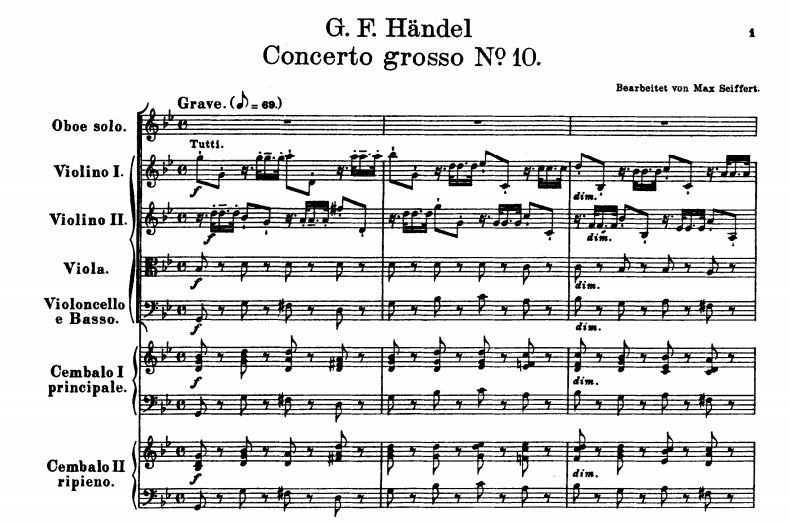
The beginning of the concerto.

The Oboe Concerto No. 3 in G minor (HWV 287) was composed by George Frideric Handel for oboe, orchestra and basso continuo, possibly in 1704–05, when he was still in Hamburg. It was first published in Leipzig in 1863 (from unknown sources) in which it was described as a work from 1703. No other source for the work is known. Other catalogues of Handel's music have referred to the work as HG xxi, 100; and HHA iv/12,3.

A typical performance of the work takes around ten minutes.

== Movements ==
The work consists of four movements:

1. Grave. A characteristically dotted rhythm in French style.
2. Allegro
3. Largo. A sarabande.
4. Allegro. Thematically derived from the first movement, a sprightly piece with dialogue between the solo oboe and the accompanying instruments.

== See also ==
- Handel's concertos
