= Allor ch'io dissi addio =

1708 cantata by Georg Frideric Handel

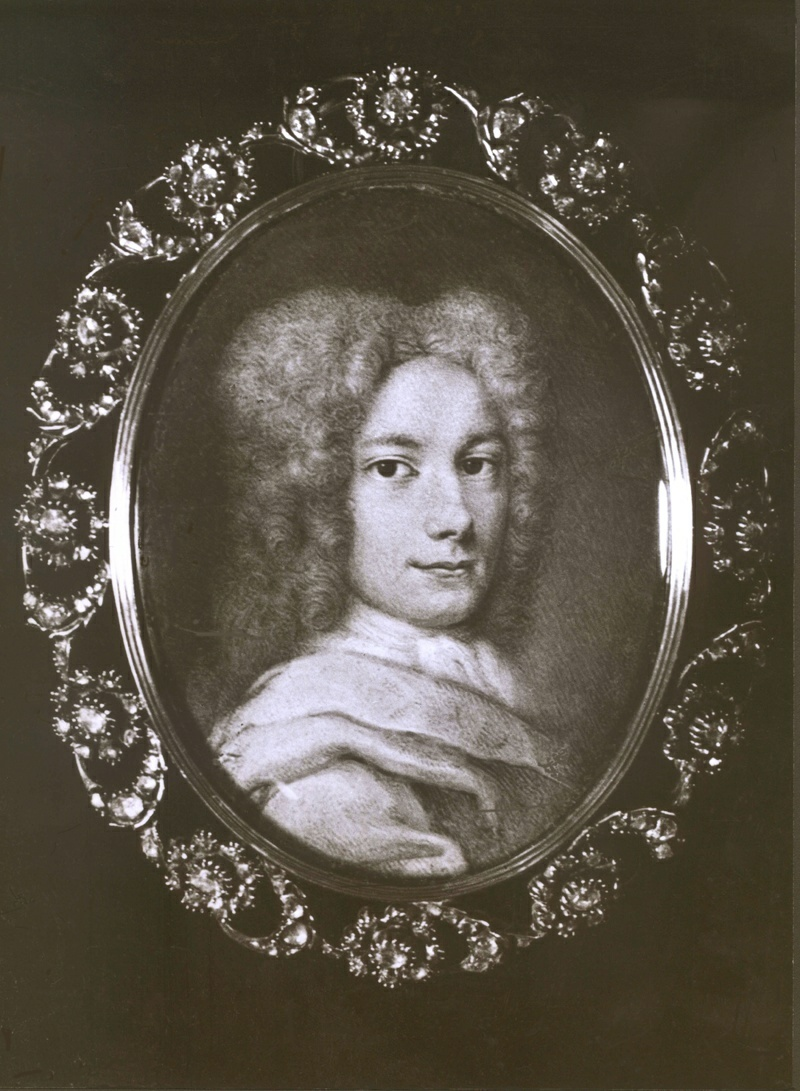
Händel c. 1710

Allor ch'io dissi addio (HWV 80) is a dramatic secular cantata (a vocal composition with an instrumental accompaniment) for soprano written by Georg Frideric Handel in 1707–08. Other catalogues of Handel's music have referred to the work as HG l,8 (there is no HHA designation of the work). The title of the cantata translates as "Then I said goodbye".

== History ==
The cantata is one of the many that Handel composed in Rome whilst in his early twenties.

== Synopsis ==
The text tells of someone who thought they could conquer their feelings as they leave their loved one behind, however that proves to be impossible.

== Structure ==
The work is scored for solo soprano and keyboard (with scattered figured bass markings). The cantata contains two recitative-aria pairings.

A typical performance of the work takes about eight minutes.

== Movements ==
The work consists of four movements:

	Type	Key sig.	Time sig.	Tempo	Bars	Text (Italian)	Text (English)	Notes
I	Recitative		4/4		17	Allor ch'io dissi addio e ch'io lasciai quel memorabil loco, dove nacque il mio foco, pensò folle il cor mio tutti gli ardori suoi render di gelo, e fortuna cangiar per cangiar cielo. Ahi lassa! che mi seque in ogni tempo, in ogni parte amore. E di notte e di giorno a tutte l'ore all'occhio della mente, rende l'amato oggetto ognor presente.	Then I said goodbye and left that memorable place where my love was born, in a fit of madness, I thought I could turn my heart's heat to frost and seek my fortune under a new sky. Alas! I'm seized at all times, by all parts of love. And all night and day and at all hours in my mind's eye, my beloved is ever present.	
II	Aria	D minor	4/4	Allegro	44	Son qual cerva ferita che fugge, dalla man che l'ancide e l'impiaga, Ma se meco è lo stral che mi strugge lontamanza non salda la piaga.	Like an injured deer I flee, from the hand that kills and wounds, But if I carry the arrow that torments me distance cannot heal the wound.	Two sections (29 and 15 bars)—with no repeat markings. Includes a "Da Capo", "Fine" instruction.
III	Recitative		4/4		13	Anzi se nacque il mio amoroso desio d'una bella virtù figlio innocente, sia lontano o presente, sempre fisso è nel cor l'amato oggetto, ne a così giusto affetto, resiste di ragion l'alto consiglio, ch'anzi a sequir m'esorta un bell'amor che di virtude è figlio.	Indeed, if my amorous desire has the noble virtue of an innocent child, whether away or present, always fixed in my heart is the beloved object of my love, reason resists high council but urges me to follow a noble love born of virtue.	
IV	Aria	F major	4/4	A tempo giusto	20	Il dolce foco mio, ch'accende un bel desio, amor lusinga. Ma nasce un rio Timor, onde languisce il cor, che gli non finga.	My sweet flame, fanned by a great desire, is flattered by love. But a fear is born in me, so my heart languishes, in case he is pretending.	Two sections (13 and 7 bars)—with no repeat markings. Includes a "Da Capo", "Fine" instruction.

(Movements do not contain repeat markings unless indicated. The number of bars is the raw number in the manuscript—not including repeat markings. The above is taken from volume 50, starting at page 8, of the Händel-Gesellschaft edition.)

== See also ==
- List of cantatas by George Frideric Handel
