= As Pants the Hart (Handel) =

Anthem by George Frideric Handel

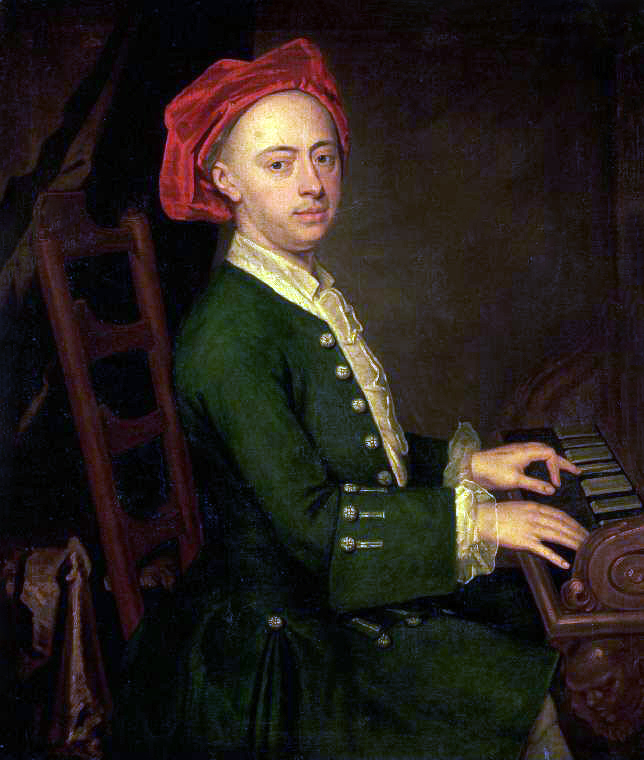
The Chandos portrait of Georg Friedrich Händel, c. 1720

As pants the hart (HWV 251) is an anthem composed by George Frideric Handel for the Chapel Royal of Queen Anne and subsequently revised. There are five versions of the work (indicated by the letters a to e), the first being completed in 1713, and the final in 1738. HWV 251a was the first anthem Handel composed for the Chapel Royal.

The 1713 version is an early example of Handel setting words in English, which was his third language. The anthem takes its title from the first line, the incipit, of Psalm 42. The rest of the text – it is the same for all of Handel's versions of the anthem – is also taken from the psalm, and has been attributed to John Arbuthnot. Arbuthnot clearly based his work on earlier translations, as the text opens with lines from Tate and Brady’s metrical version, but reverts at verse two to the Prayer Book version.

Handel met with royal favour in 1713 and received a major commission, the Utrecht Te Deum and Jubilate to commemorate the Peace of Utrecht. Soon after the introduction of HWV 251a to the Chapel Royal repertoire, Handel was awarded a pension from Queen Anne of £200 per annum. The royal patronage continued under the Hanoverians. In 1723 (soon after the composition of HWV 251d), Handel received a second pension, granted to him as "Composer to the Chapel Royal". This second pension brought Handel's total annual income from court pensions and his position as "Music Master to the Royal Princesses" to £600—a considerable sum for the time.

In Handel's day, all parts were sung by male voices—typically twelve boys and twelve men.

== Versions ==
=== HWV 251a ===
HWV 251a was probably written between December 1712 and May 1713. Along with its partner HWV 251d, it is the only anthem Handel wrote that is scored for organ and basso continuo alone. It was not written for a grand public occasion (typical of Handel's other anthems), but rather for use in the routine services of the Chapel Royal.

Even though the text is the same for all versions of HWV 251, the voice scoring differs. For example, in the HWV 251a version, the movement Tears are my daily food... was written for solo alto, and the movement Why so full of grief... was written for treble and alto (these can be compared with the voice scoring in HWV 251d—below).

Other catalogues of Handel's music have referred to the work as HG xxxiv,277 and HHA iii/9,3.

=== HWV 251b ===
HWV 251b was written in 1717 for James Brydges, and it is believed to have first been performed at St Lawrence, Whitchurch, London (the parish church for the Cannons estate). It is number six of the eleven so-called Chandos Anthems, but authorities agreed that it is one of the earliest of the set.

This version replaces the original organ accompaniment with an orchestral one, scored for the small orchestra based at Cannons. The choir at Cannons seems to have been smaller than the Chapel Royal. This version features a three-part chorus rather than the normal four parts, but it is not known how many singers Handel envisaged per part.

Other catalogues of Handel's music have referred to the work as HG xxxiv,207 and HHA iii/5,53.

The structure for this version is as follows:

Movement	Type	Voicing	Text
1	Sonata	Orchestra (strings, oboe, bassoon, organ)	
2	Trio and chorus	Trio (soprano, tenor, bass) and chorus (soprano, tenor, bass)	As pants the hart for cooling streams, so longs my soul for thee, O God.
3	Solo	Soprano	Tears are my daily food: while thus they say, where is now thy God?
4	Recitative	Tenor	Now when I think thereupon, I pour out my heart by myself: for I went with the multitude, and brought them out into the house of God.
5	Chorus	Soprano, tenor, bass	In the voice of praise and thanksgiving: among such as keep holy day.
6	Duet	Soprano and tenor	Why so full of grief, O my soul: why so disquiet within me?
7	Solo & chorus	Tenor soloist and chorus (soprano, tenor, bass)	Put thy trust in God: for I will praise him.

=== HWV 251c ===
HWV 251c is an orchestrated version of the anthem, and its composition almost immediately followed the composition of HWV 251d.

Other catalogues of Handel's music have referred to the work as HG xxxiv,239 (there is no HHA number).

=== HWV 251d ===
HWV 251d was completed in 1722 and marked Handel's return to active participation at the Chapel Royal. It is a continuo-only scoring, and there is no direct evidence that it was ever performed in Handel's time.

Other catalogues of Handel's music have referred to the work as HG xxxiv,233 and HHA iii/9,25.

A typical performance takes about 12 minutes. The structure for the work is as follows:

	Type	Voicing	Text
I	Sextet	Treble I, treble II, alto, tenor, bass I, and bass II	As pants the hart for cooling streams, so longs my soul for thee, O God.
II	Solo	Alto and quartet (treble, alto, tenor, bass)	Tears are my daily food: while thus they say, where is now thy God?
III	Recitative	Bass	Now when I think thereupon, I pour out my heart by myself: for I went with the multitude, and brought them out into the house of God.
IV	Chorus		In the voice of praise and thanksgiving: among such as keep holy day.
V	Duet	Alto I and alto II	Why so full of grief, O my soul: why so disquiet within me?
VI	Chorus		Put thy trust in God: for I will praise him.

=== HWV 251e ===
HWV 251e is a version of the anthem written for a benefit evening at the King's Theatre, Haymarket on 28 March 1738. It was based on HWV 251c, but the initial, instrumental sinfonia was extended with another movement and a concluding Alleluja movement was added to the anthem. Originally a solo movement in C major, "Now, when I think thereupon" was transposed into D minor and split into a solo recitative followed by a unison tenor and bass chorus on the text "For I went with the multitude". In the original setting at the King's Theatre, the orchestra consisted of oboes, bassoons, strings and keyboard continuo.

Other catalogues of Handel's music have referred to the work as HHA iii/9,247 (there is no HG number).

== See also ==
- Anthems by George Frideric Handel
