= O lucenti, o sereni occhi =

1707 secular cantata by G. F. Handel

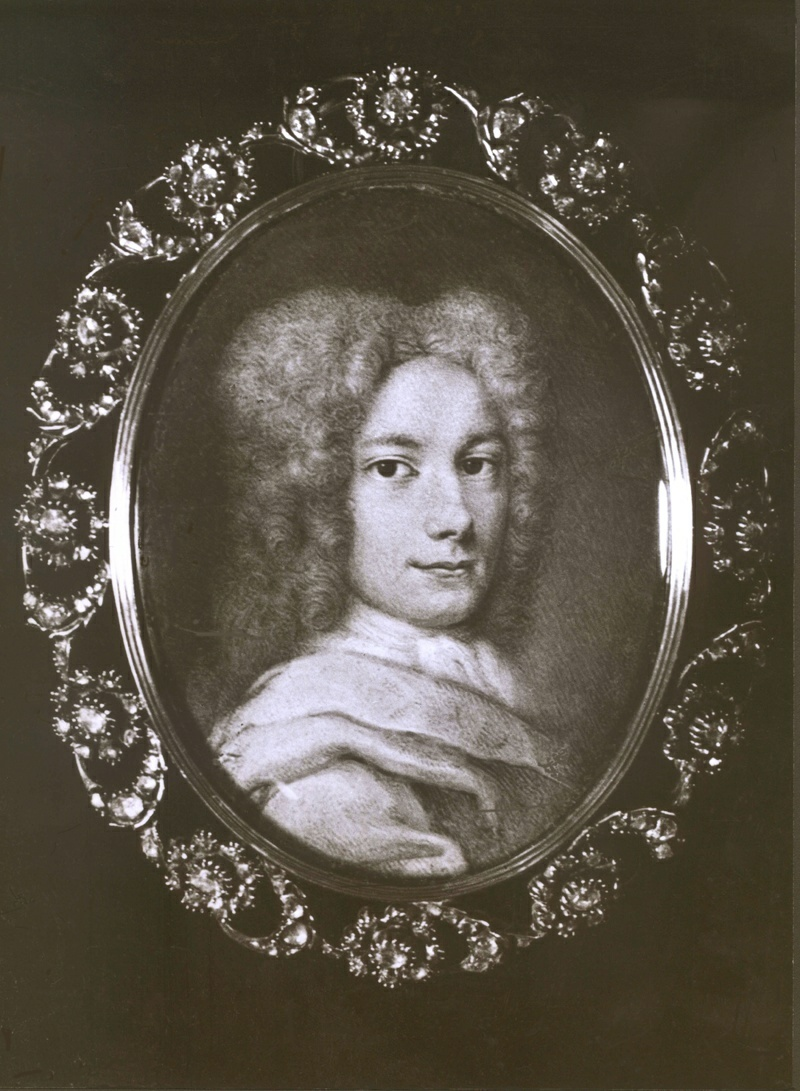
Händel c. 1710

O lucenti, o sereni occhi (HWV 144) is a dramatic secular cantata for soprano written by Georg Frideric Handel in 1707. Other catalogues of Handel's music have referred to the work as HG li, 28; (there is no HHA numbering). The title of the cantata translates as "O shining, o serene eyes".

== History ==
Handel's original manuscript for the cantata has not survived, but a copy in the Santini Collection suggests that the work originated under the patronage of Ruspoli. The work can be dated to the spring or summer of 1707, and Handel reused aspects of the first aria in his opera Rodrigo in the same year.

== Synopsis ==
Even though the work is performed by a female voice, the text does not reveal whether the "voice" is male or female. The first aria relates how beautiful eyes cause the singer to languish and die. The second aria tells how blazing eyes cause the singer both pleasure and pain.

== Structure ==
The work is scored for solo soprano and keyboard (with figured bass markings). The cantata contains two recitative-aria pairings. The use of silence (with musical rests) is notable in the work.

A typical performance of the work takes about eight minutes.

== Movements ==
The work consists of four movements:

	Type	Key	Meter	Tempo	Bars	Text (Italian)	Text (English)	Notes
I	Recitative		4/4		8	O lucenti o sereni occhi, luci fatali, ben vi scorgo qual tremoli baleni; che fulmini d'amore presagite crudeli a questo core?	O shining, o serene eyes, fatal lights, I see as trembling lightning flashes; what cruel bolts of love you strike to my heart?	Handel breaks the three syllables of "tre-mo-li" (to tremble) with quaver rests to depict quivering.
II	Aria	A minor	4/4	Adagio	24	Per voi languisco e moro, luci belle e pur godete. Voi, negandomi ristoro, dispettose m'uccidete.	For you I languish and die, beautiful lights and yet you enjoy. You deny me relief, and spiteful, kill me.	Includes a "Da Capo", "Fine" instruction. Handel depicts pain with a stabbing dotted-rhythm accompaniment.
III	Recitative		4/4		9	Messagiero verace, or la guerra bramate, or la tregua vi piace, e per tormento all'alma innamorata siete qua' acri demoni d'averno, e nel ciel di belta lampi, d'inferno.	True messenger, you yearn for war, or you like a truce, and the torment of a loving soul you are like the savage demons of Hell, and in a beautiful heaven, flashes of hell.	
IV	Aria	E minor	3/4	Andante	71	In voi, pupille ardenti, ritrovo il mio piacer trovo la pena. Per voi, luci splendenti, quel faretrato amor, il mio dolente cor, stringe in catena.	In your burning eyes I find pleasure and pain. Because of you, bright lights, love, with his arrows, my aching heart is bound in chains.	Includes a "Da Capo", "Fine" instruction. Handel sets "pleasure" with a dissonance and "pain" with extended notes. Musical rests after "chains" ("catena") suggest the musicians are having trouble continuing.

(Movements do not contain repeat markings unless indicated. The number of bars is the raw number in the manuscript—not including repeat markings. The above is taken from volume 51, starting at page 28, of the Händel-Gesellschaft edition.)

== See also ==
- List of cantatas by George Frideric Handel
