= Oboe Concerto No. 1 (Handel) =

1740 composition by George Frideric Handel

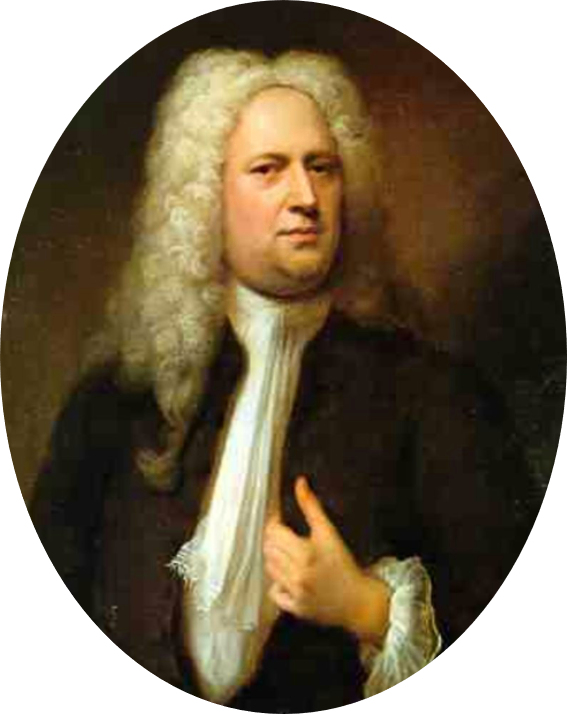
Portrait of George Frideric Handel by Balthasar Denner, 1733

The Oboe Concerto No. 1 in B♭ major (HWV 301) was composed by George Frideric Handel for oboe, orchestra and basso continuo. It was first published in the fourth volume of Select Harmony by Walsh in 1740. Other catalogues of Handel's music have referred to the work as HG xxi, 85; and HHA iv/12,17.

The concerto is thought to be an early work of Handel's, however the attribution to Handel has been questioned on stylistic grounds.

A typical performance of the work takes almost eight minutes.

== Movements ==
The work consists of four movements:

1. Adagio
2. Allegro
3. Siciliana
4. Vivace (in the rhythm of a minuet)

== See also ==
- Handel's concertos
