= Ode for the Birthday of Queen Anne =

1713 secular cantata composed by George Frideric Handel

George Frideric Handel

Ode for the Birthday of Queen Anne (HWV 74) is a secular cantata composed by George Frideric Handel to a libretto by Ambrose Philips, of which the first line, "Eternal source of light divine", provides an alternative title for the work. It was probably composed during January 1713 for a performance on 6 February 1713, although there is no record of the performance having actually taken place. Other catalogues of Handel's music have referred to the work as HG xlvi A; and HHA i/6.

== Overview ==
The cantata celebrates Queen Anne's birthday, and the accomplishment of the Treaty of Utrecht (negotiated by the Tory ministry of Anne in 1712) to end the War of the Spanish Succession. It is scored for 3 solo voices, choir and chamber orchestra.

Queen Anne was said by the Duke of Manchester to be "too careless or too busy to listen to her own band, and had no thought of hearing and paying new players however great their genius or vast their skill." Nevertheless, and whether or not she ever heard this ode for her birthday, she granted Handel a "pension" (subsidy for living expenses) of two hundred pounds a year, for life.

== Structure ==
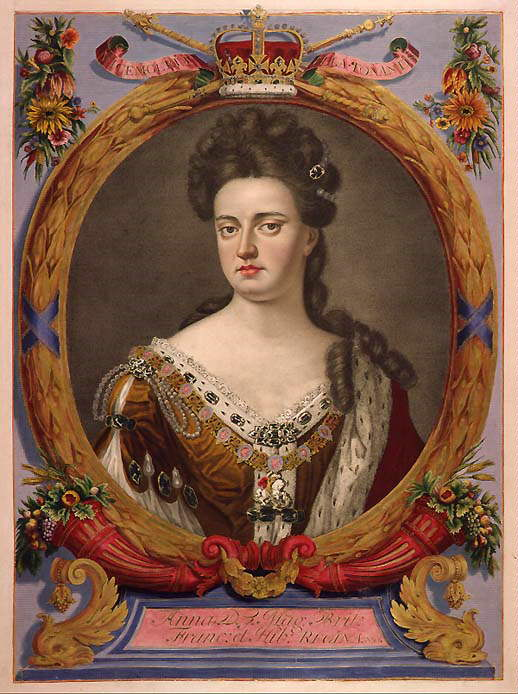
Queen Anne

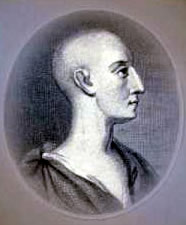
Ambrose Philips, author of the text of "Eternal Source of Light Divine"

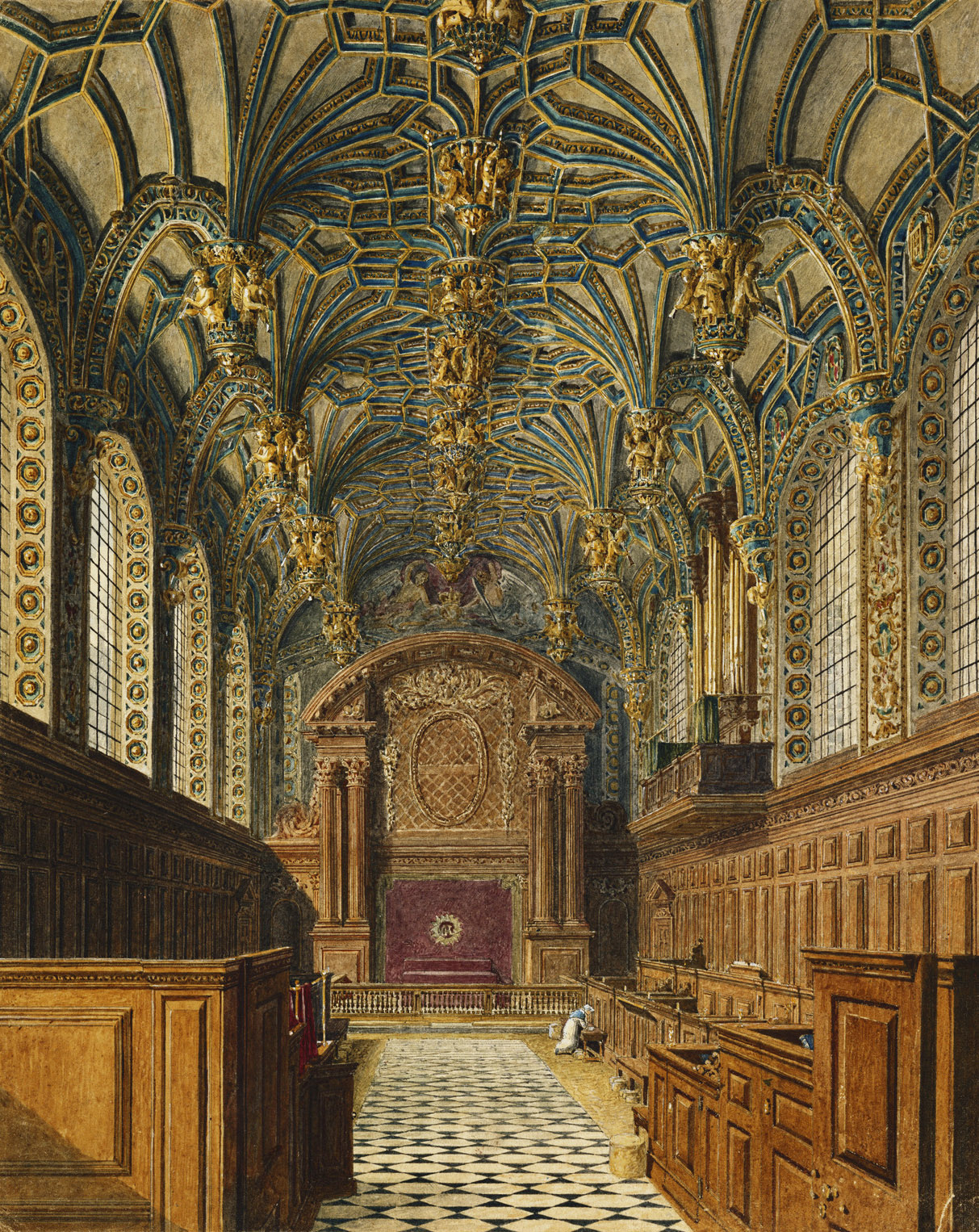
Hampton Court Palace, Chapel, by Charles Wild, 1819 - royal coll 922125 313698 ORI 2

Each of the seven stanzas of the ode concludes with the following words sung by the chorus:

The day that gave great Anna birth,
Who fix'd a lasting peace on Earth.

- (Alto solo with solo trumpet over sustained strings)

Eternal source of light divine
With double warmth thy beams display
And with distinguish'd glory shine
To add a lustre to this day.

- (Alto solo, then chorus with orchestra)

The day that gave great Anna birth
Who fix'd a lasting peace on earth.

- (Soprano solo, then chorus with orchestra)

Let all the winged race with joy
Their wonted homage sweetly pay
Whilst towr'ing in the azure sky
They celebrate this happy day.
The day that gave great Anna birth
Who fix'd a lasting peace on earth.

- (Alto solo, then alto and soprano solo with chorus and orchestra)

Let flocks and herds their fear forget
Lions and wolves refuse their prey
And all in friendly consort meet
Made glad by this propitious day.
The day that gave great Anna birth
Who fix'd a lasting peace on earth.

- (Bass and alto duet, then chorus with orchestra. The ground bass of this movement with octave leaps was reused by Handel in his "Concerto a due cori".)

Let rolling streams their gladness show
With gentle murmurs whilst they play
And in their wild meanders flow
Rejoicing in this blessed day.
The day that gave great Anna birth
Who fix'd a lasting peace on earth.

- (Soprano and alto duet with solo oboe and orchestra)

Kind Health descends on downy wings
Angels conduct her on the way.
T'our glorious Queen new life she brings
And swells our joys upon this day.

- (Alto and soprano, then chorus with orchestra)

The day that gave great Anna birth
Who fix'd a lasting peace on earth.

- (Bass solo, then chorus with orchestra)

Let envy then conceal her head
And blasted faction glide away.
No more her hissing tongues we'll dread
Secure in this auspicious day.
The day that gave great Anna birth
Who fix'd a lasting peace on earth.

- (Alto solo then chorus with echo effects, solo trumpet and orchestra)

United nations shall combine
To distant climes their sound convey
That Anna's actions are divine
And this the most important day!
The day that gave great Anna birth
Who fix'd a lasting peace on earth.

== Notable performances ==
On 23 August 2007, Kate Royal performed the aria "Eternal source of light divine" at the Proms.

On 19 May 2018, Elin Manahan Thomas performed the aria "Eternal source of light divine" as the bridal entry music for the wedding of the Duke and Duchess of Sussex, accompanied by the event's orchestra and with David Blackadder playing the trumpet obbligato.

== Selected recordings ==
- Alfred Deller (countertenor), Mary Thomas (soprano), Maurice Bevan (bass), Deller Consort, Oriana Concert Choir, Vienna Symphony Chamber Orchestra, Alfred Deller (conductor). Vanguard Records 8113. Released 1963.
- James Bowman (countertenor), Emma Kirkby, (soprano), David Thomas, (bass), English Chamber Orchestra, Choir of Christ Church Cathedral, Oxford, Simon Preston (conductor). Decca 4666762. Released 1978.
- James Bowman (countertenor), Gillian Fisher (soprano), Michael George (bass), Choir of New College, Oxford, The King's Consort, Robert King (conductor). Hyperion Records CDA66315. Released 1989.
- Robin Blaze (countertenor), Susan Gritton (soprano), Michael George (bass), King's College Choir, Cambridge, The Academy of Ancient Music, Stephen Cleobury (conductor). EMI Classics CDC 5571402. Released 2001.
- Andreas Scholl (countertenor), Helene Guilmette (soprano), Andreas Wolf (bass), Vocalconsort Berlin, Akademie fur Alte Musik Berlin, Marcus Creed (conductor). Harmonia Mundi 0794881924325. Released 2005.

Although composed for countertenor, the section "Eternal source of light divine" is often sung by sopranos. For example:

- Elin Manahan Thomas (soprano), Album: Eternal Light, Armonico Consort, Heliodor (Universal Music Decca) CD 4765970. Released July 2007
