= Publications by Friedrich Chrysander =

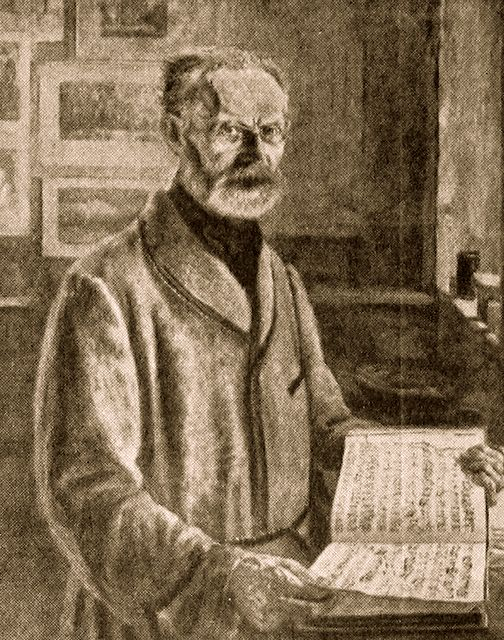
Friedrich Chrysander

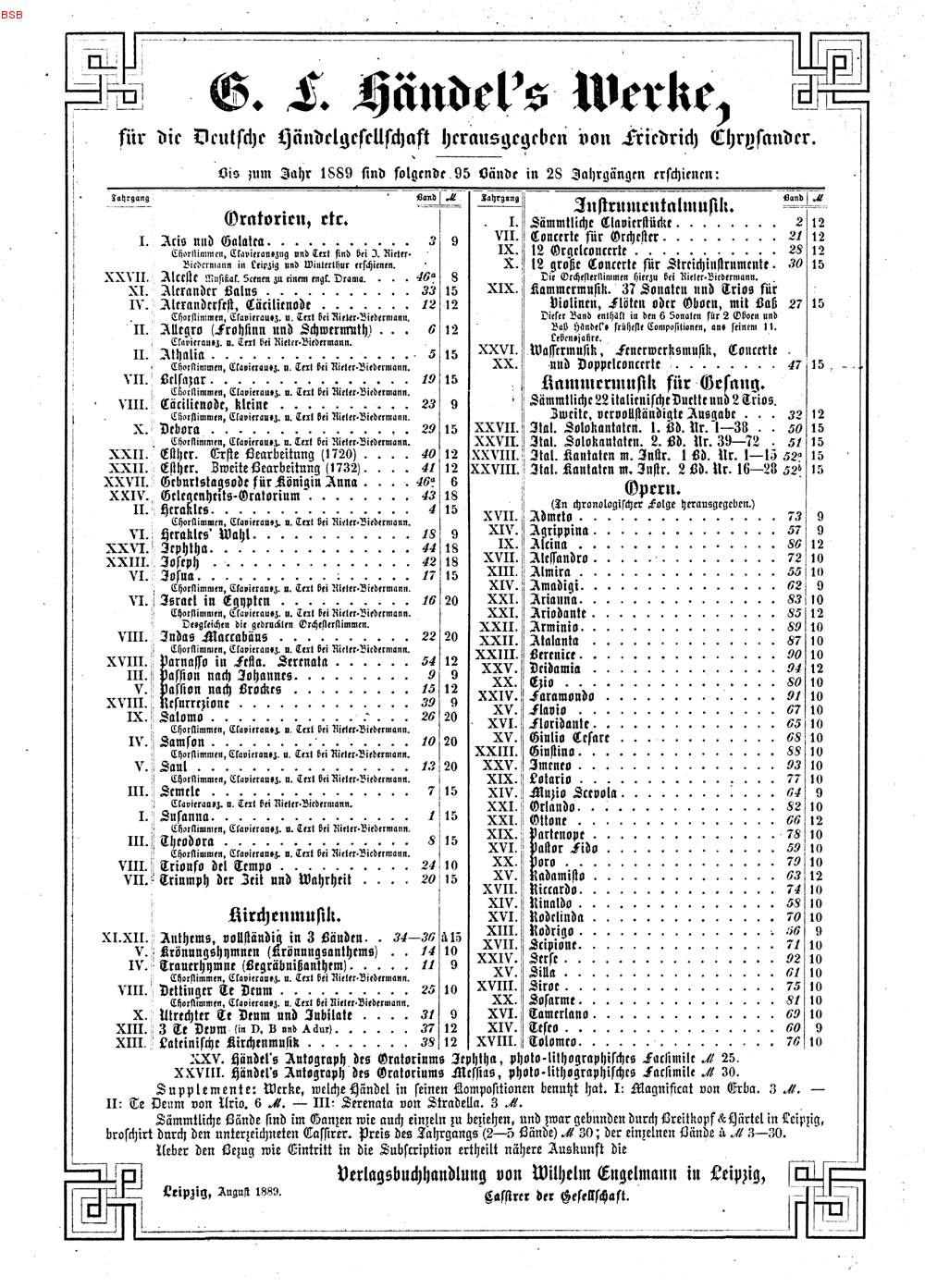
Catalogue of published works of Handel 1889 (last page of Cantate con strumenti di G.F. Händel (Libro Secondo))

Karl Franz Friedrich Chrysander was a German music historian and critic, whose edition of the works of George Frideric Handel and authoritative writings on many other composers established him as a pioneer of 19th-century musicology.

Between 1858 and 1902, the Händel-Gesellschaft or "German Handel Society" edition of Handel's collected works was published, and this was almost entirely the work of Chrysander;

== Publications ==
Chrysander made a number of publications under the Händelgesellschaft name (see Händegesellschaft – volumes with Chrysander as publisher).

Chrysander's other publications include:

Publication	Published	Manuscript	Notes and works
G.F. Händel – (Volume 1)	1858	Google books	A 495-page biography of Handel. Volume 1. Written in German. The two main parts of the book cover the periods in Handel's life from 1685 to 1706 and from 1707 to 1720.
XV Solos for a German Flute, Hoboy, or Violin with a thorough bass for the Harpsicord or Bass Violin	1879	IMSLP	A 72-page volume containing sonatas for various instruments, composed by Handel. Despite the title, the publication contains 20 sonatas, which have the following HWV numbers: 379, 359b, 360, 361, 362, 363b, 364a, 365, 366, 367b, 368, 369, 370, 371, 372, 373, 374, 375, 376, Sonata (spurious) The first 16 sonatas above (379 to 373) were reprinted in the HG volume 27 (part I). Sonata VI (364a) and the final four sonatas were included as part of HG volume 48 (pp. 112-139).
Les oeuvres de Arcangelo Corelli – (Volume 1)	1888	Google books (Reprint of Op. 1)	Published in partnership with Joachim. Op. 1: Sonate da chiesa a trè. Twelve church sonatas. Op. 2: Sonate da camera a trè. Twelve chamber sonatas.
Les oeuvres de Arcangelo Corelli – (Volume 2)	1888 – 1891		Published in partnership with Joachim. Op. 3: Sonate da chiesa a trè. Twelve church sonatas. Op. 4: Sonate da camera a trè. Twelve chamber sonatas.
Les oeuvres de Arcangelo Corelli – (Volume 3)	1888 – 1891		Published in partnership with Joachim. Op. 5: 12 Suonati a violino e violone o cimbalo. Twelve violin sonatas.
Les oeuvres de Arcangelo Corelli – (Volumes 4 and 5)	1891		Published in partnership with Joachim. Op. 6: 12 concerti grossi.

== See also ==
- List of compositions by George Frideric Handel
- Arcangelo Corelli
