= Francesco Antonio Urio =

Italian composer

Francesco Antonio Urio (1631/32 – c. 1719) was an Italian composer of the Baroque era.

== Life ==
Urio was born in Milan in 1631 or 1632, and died there in (or after) 1719.

Urio held maestro di cappella posts in: Spoleto's Cathedral (1679), Urbino (1681–83), Assisi, Genoa, Santi Apostoli in Rome (1690), Frari in Venice (1697), and at S. Francesco in Milan (1715–19).

Urio was a member of the Franciscan order.

== Legacy ==
George Frideric Handel reused Urio's work, including parts of the Te Deum, in works such as Saul, Israel in Egypt, L'Allegro, il Penseroso ed il Moderato, and the Dettingen Te Deum.

== Works ==
Urio's works include:

- Motetti di concerto a 2, 3, e 4 voci con violini e senza (Op. 1) (Rome, 1690)
- Salmi concertati a 3 voci con violini (Op. 2) (Bologna, 1697).
- Te Deum (c. 1700). Friedrich Chrysander published the work in Denkmäler der Tonkunst (Volume V, Bergedorf, near Hamburg, 1871), and later as Supplement 2 of the Händel-Gesellschaft.
- Tantum ergo for soprano and bass continuo (Abschrift in der Bibliothek des Royal College of Music London)
- Oratorium Gilard ed Eliada, Milan, Biblioteca Estense, mus.f.1200
