= Salve Regina (Handel) =

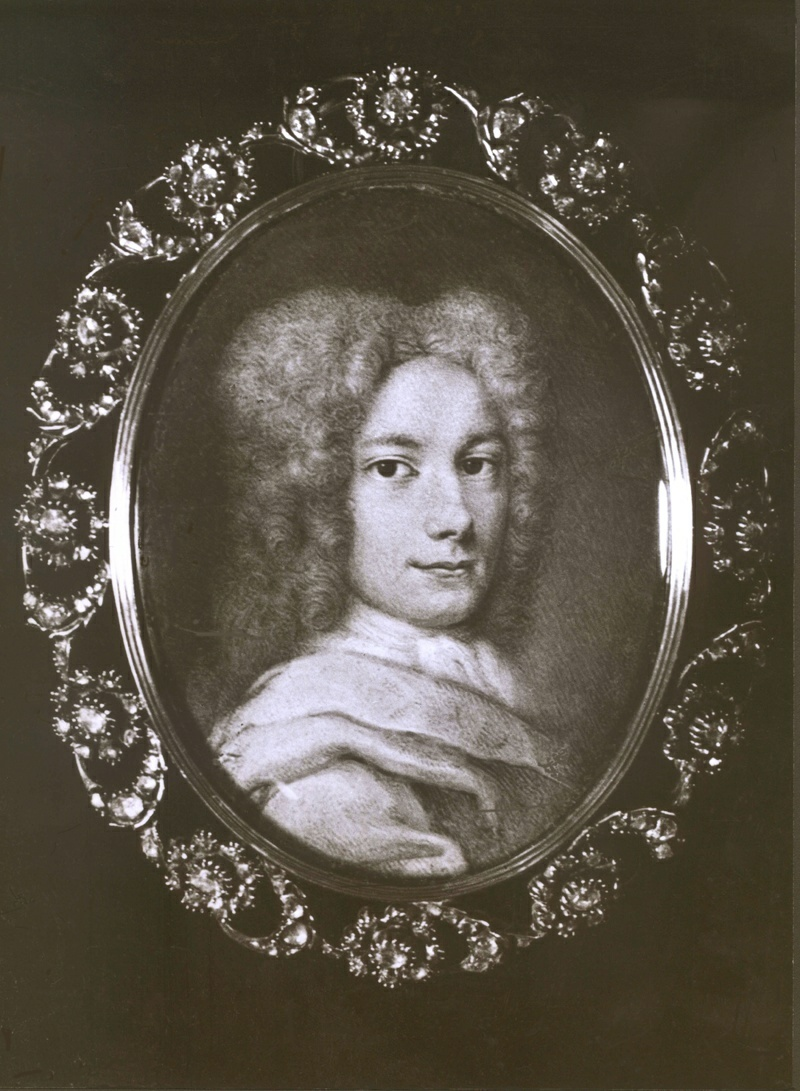
George Friederic Handel c. 1710

Salve Regina (HWV 241) is an antiphon composed by George Friederic Handel around 1707. It is most likely that the work was first performed for Trinity Sunday in Vignanello on 17 July 1707 in the Church of Santa Maria in Montesanto, under the patronage of the Colonna family. Other catalogues of Handel's music have referred to the work as HG xxxviii, 136 (there is no HHA designation of the work).

The work is based on the Marian anthems with their supplicatory text.

A typical performance lasts nearly 12 minutes.

== Movements ==
The opening and closing movements are slow and reflective and frame a vigorous allegro movement.

The work has the following three movements:

	Type and voice	Text	English Version
I	Soprano solo	Salve Regina, mater misericordiae, vita, dulcedo et spes nostra, salve. Ad te clamamus exules filii Evae, ad te suspiramus gementes et flentes in hac lacrimarum valle.	Hail Queen, mother of mercy, our life, our sweetness, and our hope, hail. To you we cry, exiles, sons of Eve. To you we sigh, mourning and weeping, in this valley of tears.
II	Soprano solo	Eia ergo, advocata nostra, illos tuos misericordes oculos ad nos converte, et Jesum benedictum fructum ventris tuis nobis post hoc exilium ostende.	Turn then, our advocate, your eyes of mercy towards us. And after this our exile show to us the blessed fruit of your womb, Jesus.
III	Soprano solo	O clemens, o pia, o dulcis virgo Maria.	Merciful, holy, sweet virgin Mary.

== See also ==
- List of Latin church music by George Frideric Handel
