= Bernd Baselt =

German musicologist (1934–1993)

Bernd Baselt (13 September 1934 – 18 October 1993) was a German musicologist noted for his works on the Baroque composer George Frideric Handel. He was born in Halle, Saxony-Anhalt and died in Hanover.

From 1953 to 1955 Baselt studied at the Academy for Music and Theater and at the Martin Luther University in Halle. He gained professorial rank in music at the university in 1975.

Although writing widely on composers (such as Telemann), Baselt's most notable work was the Händel-Werke-Verzeichnis (abbreviated as HWV). The HWV is considered to be the modern-day catalogue of Handel's works, and was published in three volumes (in German) between 1978 and 1986.
