= Händel-Gesellschaft =

Collected edition of the works of Handel

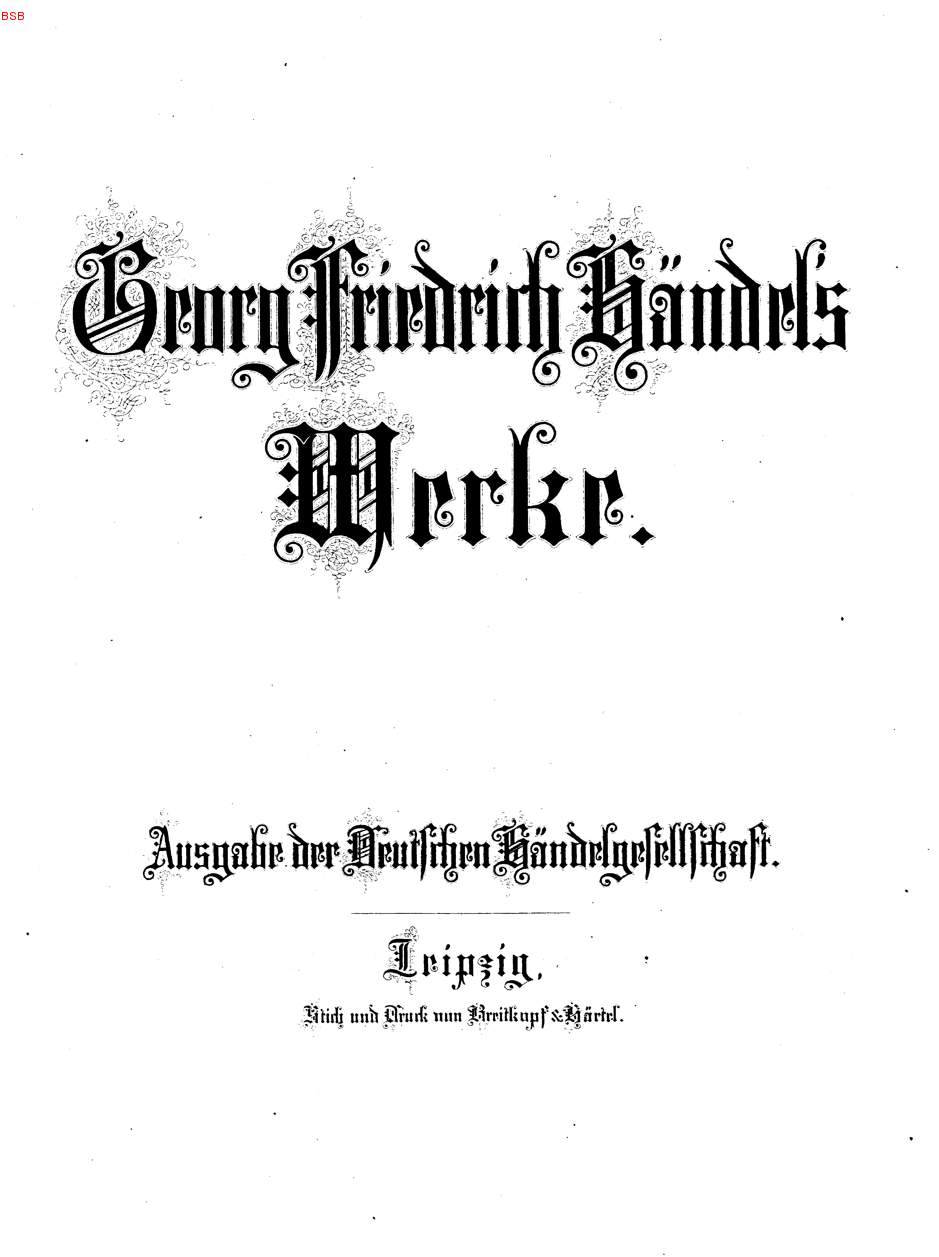
A title page of Händelgesellschaft volume 1 (1858)

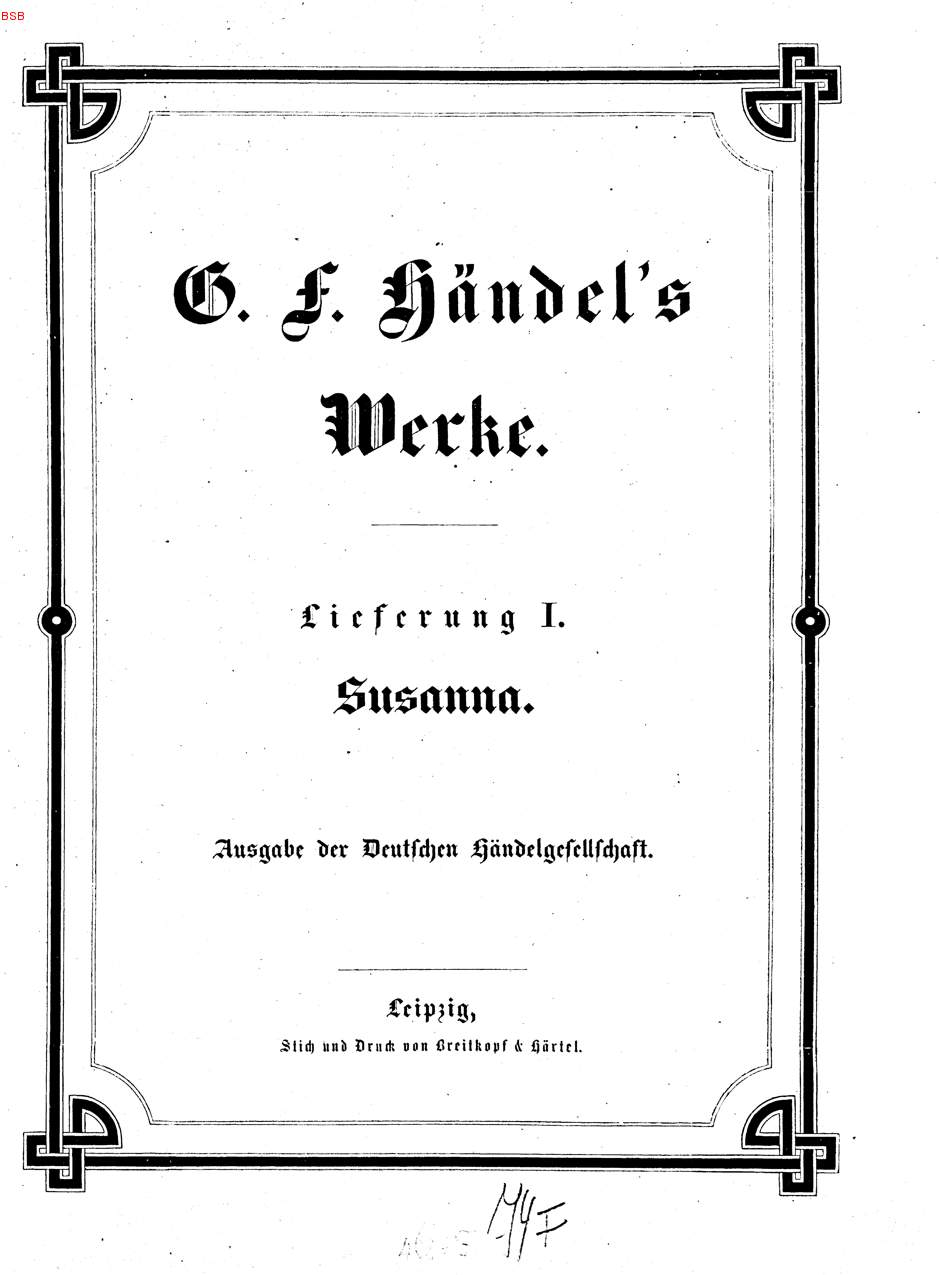
Page from Händelgesellschaft volume 1 (1858) – showing the work contained in the volume: Handel's oratorio Susanna

Between 1858 and 1902, the Händel-Gesellschaft ("German Handel Society") produced a collected 105-volume edition of the works of George Frideric Handel. Even though the collection was initiated by the society, many of the volumes were published by Friedrich Chrysander working alone (Chrysander was the major contributor for almost all of the volumes). The wording on the title page of the volumes is "Georg Friedrich Händel's Werke. Ausgabe der Deutschen Händelgesellschaft" which translates as "Georg Friedrich Handel's works. Edition of the German Handel Society". Chrysander's work has been criticised, however the scale of his achievement is also praised. The collection's abbreviation of "HG" can be used to identify individual works by Handel; for example Handel's Messiah can be referred to as "HG xlv" (with the Roman numerals "xlv" indicating that the work is in volume 45). For practical use, the HG system has been superseded by the HWV numbering system. The 105 volumes do not contain the complete works of Handel—with at least 250 of his works unpublished in the collection.

== History ==
Before the Händelgesellschaft, at least two collected editions of Handel's works had been produced. Samuel Arnold's 180-volume collection was produced between 1787 and 1797—however, it was far from complete, and included, for example, only five of Handel's 42 Italian operas. The other major collection was produced by the English Handel Society (founded by Sir George Macfarren) between 1843 and 1858—however, it too was incomplete.

In 1856, the Händel-Gesellschaft was founded by Chrysander and the literary historian Georg Gottfried Gervinus (with Chrysander the only active editor).

== The society ==
Despite the reference to a "society" in the name of the Händel-Gesellschaft (including a board of directors), the edition was produced almost entirely by Chrysander, who carried on publication of the edition even when the society dropped out of the project. Chrysander set up an office in the garden at his home, and from 1862 onwards personally superintended the engraving and printing of the edition. Additionally, he sold fruits and vegetables raised in his garden to derive further income during the years of publication.

The first volume (1858) was prepared by Julius Rietz (although with results that displeased Chrysander). Max Seiffert assisted with some of the later editing.

Due to its being more comprehensive than previous collections, the Händel-Gesellschaft edition was long considered the standard reference for Handel's works. When the Hallische Händel-Ausgabe was inaugurated in 1955, it was at first intended as a supplement to Chrysander's work, and only later (in 1958) became a full critical edition in its own right.

== Criticism ==
Some have criticised Chrysander's efforts, with one writer commenting that "he was an autocrat, a law into himself, who often made his selection according to his desires, who altered and revised at will, and who even falsified documents to suit his purposes," and another criticising his "arbitrary selection of material in the more complex works and his failure to explain his methods."

There are also problems such as the renumbering of the chamber sonatas originally published by Handel as his Op. 1 and Op. 2; for example, the Trio sonata in B flat for two violins and continuo, Op. 2 no. 3, appears in the Händel-Gesellschaft edition as Op. 2 no. 4. These renumberings by Chrysander resulted in confusion which still persists.

The 1911 Encyclopædia Britannica, Eleventh Edition comments that "The complete edition of the German Handelgesellschaft suffers from being the work of one man who would not recognize that his task was beyond any single man's power ... Yet Chrysander's services in the restoration of Handel are beyond praise".

== Structure of the society ==
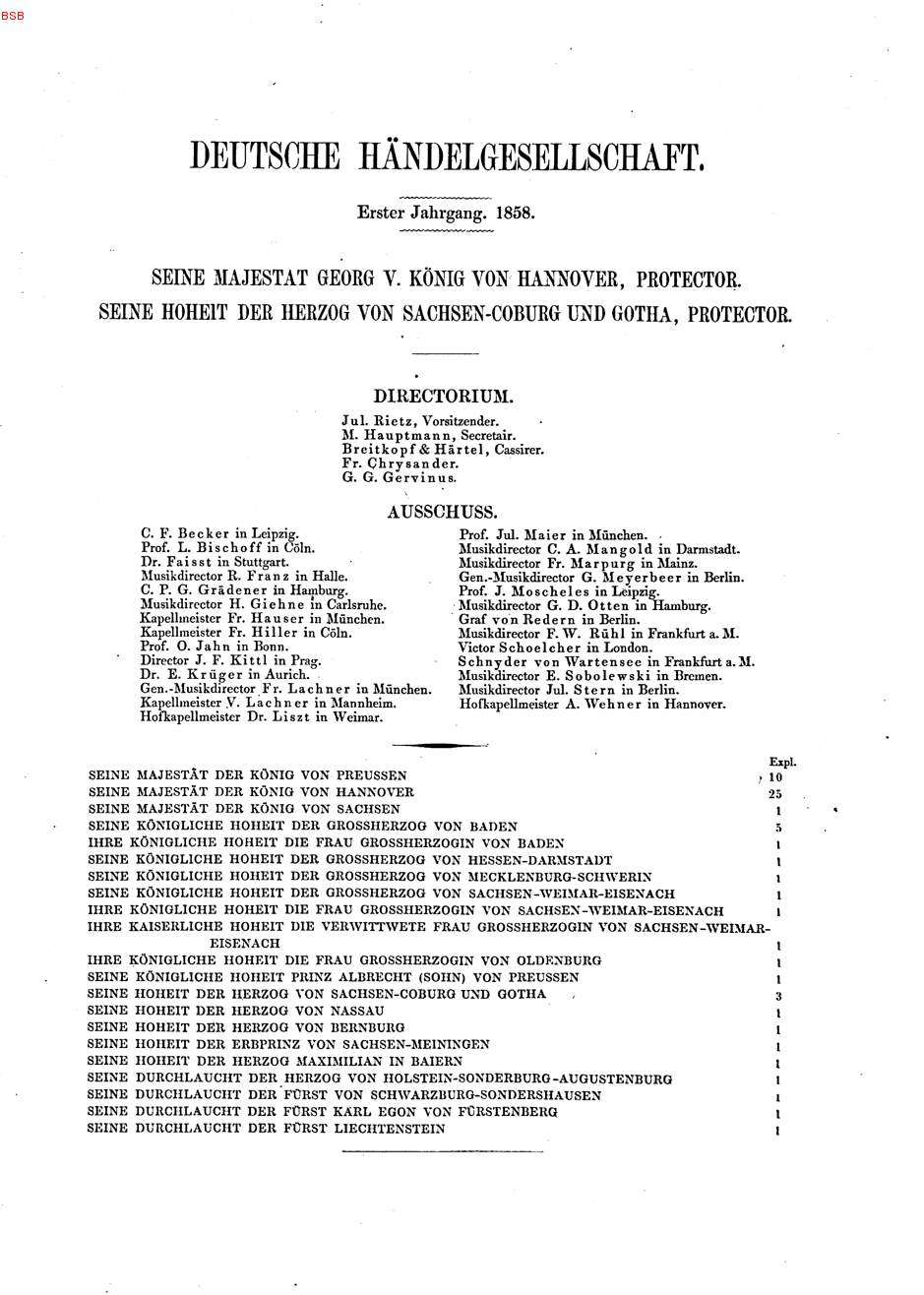
Volume 1, page 13 of the Händelgesellschaft (1858) – detailing the structure of the society

At the time of the publication of the first volume of the Händelgesellschaft in 1858, the society was run by directors and a committee. The following details were taken from information printed in the first volume:

=== Directors ===
The directors (German: Directorium) were:

- Jul. Rietz, Vorsitzender (president)
- M. Hauptmann, Secretair (secretary)
- Breitkopf & Härtel, Cassirer (treasurer)
- Fr. Chrysander
- G. G. Gervinus

=== Committee ===
The 27 committee members (German: Ausschuss) were:

C. F. Becker in Leipzig	Director J. F. Kittl in Prag	Prof. J. Moscheles in Leipzig
Prof. L. Bischoff in Cöln	Dr. E. Krüger in Aurich	Musikdirector G. D. Otten in Hamburg
Dr. Faisst in Stuttgart	Gen.-Musikdirector Fr. Lachner in München	Graf von Redern in Berlin
Musikdirector R. Franz in Halle	Kapellmeister V. Lachner in Mannheim	Musikdirector F. W. Rühl in Frankfurt a. M.
C. P. G. Grädener in Hamburg	Hofkapellmeister Dr. Liszt in Weimar	Victor Schoelcher in London
Musikdirector H. Giehne in Carlsruhe	Prof. Jul. Maier in München	Schnyder von Wartensee in Frankfurt a.M.
Kapellmeister Fr. Hauser in München	Musikdirector C. A. Mangold in Darmstadt	Musikdirector E. Sobolewski in Bremen
Kapellmeister Fr. Hiller in Cöln	Musikdirector Fr. Marpurg in Mainz	Musikdirector Jul. Stern in Berlin
Prof. O. Jahn in Bonn	Gen.-Musikdirector G. Meyerbeer in Berlin	Hofkapellmeister A. Wehner in Hannover

The structure of the society was printed in the following fifteen volumes: 1, 5, 9, 12, 15, 18, 21, 23, 28, 34, 36, 56, 65, 71 and 76.

== Volumes ==
The publications were labelled as "Lieferung" (which is German for "consignment" or "delivery") followed by a Roman numeral indicating the volume number. For example, the fourth volume (containing the oratorio Hercules) was labelled as "Lieferung IV". The volumes are also sometimes referred to as "Bands".

Unless stated in the table below, Chrysander wrote a foreword for each volume. All volumes are in German, however most (again indicated below) include various English translations. Where a volume contains more than one work, the ordering of the HWV numbers indicate the order in which the works were published within the volume. The original German spelling of the volume titles has been retained.

The 105 volumes (which includes six supplement volumes) published in the Händelgesellschaft are (note that volume 49 was never published):

Vol.	Title	Foreword date	Publisher	Genre	Pages	Notes and works (including HWV numbers).
I	Susanna	16 Oct 1858	The society	Oratorio	251	Contains the score (on 216 pages) for the oratorio Susanna (HWV 66). The volume begins with three pages of a programmatic introduction (in German) titled "Ankündigung einer vollständigen Ausgabe von Händel's Werken" ("Announcement of a complete edition of Handel's works"). Contains the text of the work (also in English).
II	Klavierstücke	23 Feb 1859	The society	Keyboard (solo)	189	Contains the score (on 174 pages) of some of Handel's keyboard works. The volume begins with a page (in German) from the publishing company Breitkopf & Härtel titled "An die Mitglieder der deutschen Händelgesellschaft" (meaning "To the members of the German Handel Society"). Under the heading Erste Sammlung (First Collection) are the following eight works: Suite de pièce Vol. 1: HWV 426, 427, 428, 429, 430, 431, 432, 433 Under the heading Zweite Sammlung (Second Collection) are the following nine works: Suite de pièce Vol. 2: HWV 494 & 434/4, 435, 436, 437, 438, 439, 440, 441, 442 (HWV 437 contains Handel's famous Sarabande) Under the heading Dritts Sammlung (Third Collection) are the following twelve works: HWV 447, 452, 483, 490, 485, 575 & 496, ?, 481, 574, 585, 577, 578 Under the heading Vierte Sammlung (Fourth Collection) are the following six works: Fuga I – VI: HWV 605, 606, 607, 608, 609, 610
III	Acis und Galatea. Pastoral	25 Mar 1859	The society	Masque	151	Contains the score (on 132 pages) for the pastoral masque Acis und Galatea (HWV 49). There is no indication of who wrote the foreword. Contains the text of the work (also in English).
IV	Herakles	1 Aug 1859	The society	Oratorio	286	Contains the score (on 262 pages) for the oratorio Hercules (HWV 60). There is no indication of who wrote the foreword. Contains the text of the work (also in English).
V	Athalia	1 Nov 1859	The society	Oratorio	240	Contains the score (on 215 pages) for the oratorio Athalia (HWV 52). There is no indication of who wrote the foreword. Contains the text of the work (also in English).
VI	L'Allegro, il Penseroso ed il Moderato	26 Dec 1859	The society	Oratorio	208	Contains the score (on 180 pages) for the oratorio L'Allegro, il Penseroso ed il Moderato (HWV 55). The score includes a seven-page appendix. There is no indication of who wrote the foreword. Contains the text of the work (also in English).
VII	Semele	1 Jul 1860	The society	Oratorio	260	Contains the score (on 234 pages) for the oratorio Semele (HWV 58). Contains a brief foreword by Richter. Contains the text of the work (also in English).
VIII	Theodora	31 Dec 1860	The society	Oratorio	246	Contains the score (on 223 pages) for the oratorio Theodora (HWV 68). The score includes a three-page appendix. Contains the text of the work (also in English).
IX	Passion nach dem Evang. Johannes	25 Dec 1860	The society	Passion	106	Contains the score (on 78 pages) for the Passion according to the evangelist John. The work is believed to have been composed by the German composer Georg Böhm. Contains the text of the work (also in English).
X	Samson	31 Jul 1861	The society	Oratorio	330	Contains the score (on 296 pages) for the oratorio Samson (HWV 57). The score includes a seven-page appendix. Contains the text of the work (also in English).
XI	Trauerhymne auf den Tod der Königin Karoline	1 Dec 1861	The society	Anthem	96	Contains the score (on 81 pages) for the anthem Funeral Anthem for Queen Caroline (HWV 264). Contains the text of the work (also in English).
XII	Alexander's Fest	15 Jan 1862	The society	Ode	190	Contains the score (on 162 pages) for the ode Alexander's Feast (HWV 75). The volume gives a subtitle for the work as oder die Macht der Tonkunst (meaning "or the Power of Music"). Contains the text of the work (also in English).
XIII	Saul	1 Jul 1862	The society	Oratorio	302	Contains the score (on 286 pages) for the oratorio Saul (HWV 53). The score includes an 18-page appendix. Contains the text of the work (also in English).
XIV	Krönungshymnen für König Georg II	1 Jan 1863	The society	Anthem	138	Contains the score (on 129 pages) for the four coronation anthems: Zadok the Priest (HWV 258), The King Shall Rejoice (HWV 260), My Heart is Inditing (HWV 261), and Let Thy Hand be Strengthened (HWV 259). Contains the text of the work (also in English).
XV	Passion nach B. H. Brockes	1 Mar 1863	The society	Passion	172	Contains the score (on 155 pages) for the passion Brockes Passion (HWV 48). Contains the text of the work (with the English translation printed in the music). Following the foreword, there is an apology from the translator for the very feeble execution of his part of this work.
XVI	Israel in Aegypten	1 Aug 1863	The society	Oratorio	290	Contains the score (on 279 pages) for the oratorio Israel in Egypt (HWV 54). Contains the text of the work (also in English).
XVII	Josua	1 Mar 1864	The society	Oratorio	213	Contains the score (on 199 pages) for the oratorio Joshua (HWV 64). Contains the text of the work (also in English).
XVIII	Die Wahl des Herakles	1 May 1864	The society	Oratorio	112	Contains the score (on 90 pages) for the oratorio The Choice of Hercules (HWV 69). Contains the text of the work (also in English).
XIX	Belsazar	1 Nov 1864	The society	Oratorio	294	Contains the score (on 267 pages) for the oratorio Belshazzar (HWV 61). The score contains a six-page appendix. Contains the text of the work (also in English).
XX	Sieg der Zeit und Wahrheit	1 Jul 1865	The society	Oratorio	202	Contains the score (on 168 pages) for the oratorio The Triumph of Time and Truth (HWV 71). Contains the text of the work (also in English).
XXI	Instrumental-Concerte	1 Aug 1865	The society	Concerto	139	Contains the score (on 116 pages) of six concerti grossi (the "Opus 3" set) and various other instrumental concertos and works. The following works appear in the publication: Op. 3: HWV 312, 313, 314, 315, 316, 317 Oboe Concertos 1, 2, and 3: HWV 301, 302a, 287 Other: HWV 318 (concerto grosso), 302b (largo), 288 (violin concerto)
XXII	Judas Maccabäus	1 Jan 1866	The society	Oratorio	256	Contains the score (on 231 pages) for the oratorio Judas Maccabaeus (HWV 63). Contains the text of the work (also in English).
XXIII	Cäcilien-Ode	16 Oct 1866	The society	Ode	112	Contains the score (on 87 pages) for the ode Ode for St. Cecilia's Day (HWV 76). The score contains an eight-page appendix. Contains the text of the work (also in English).
XXIV	Il Trionfo del Tempo e dell Verità	16 Oct 1866	The society	Oratorio	130	Contains the score (on 120 pages) for the oratorio The Triumph of Time and Truth (HWV 46b). Contains the text of the work (also in English).
XXV	Dettinger Te Deum	1 Nov 1866	The society	Canticle	118	Contains the score (on 108 pages) for the canticle Dettingen Te Deum (HWV 283). Contains the text of the work (also in English).
XXVI	Salomo	1 Dec 1867	The society	Oratorio	334	Contains the score (on 327 pages) for the oratorio Solomon (HWV 67). Contains the text of the work (also in English).
XXVII	Kammermusik Sonate da Camera	15 Apr 1879	The society	Chamber music	216	Contains the score (on 200 pages) for the "Opus 1", "Opus 2" and "Opus 5" sets of instrumental sonatas (as well as many other sonatas). The foreword is also written in English. Note that the number of sonatas in parts one, three, and four differ from the number indicated by the title of the section. Part I: Fifteen Solo sonatas: (The following are generally considered to be the Opus 1 works—including Chrysander's additions to Walsh's earlier publication. See individual works for more details.) HWV 379, 359b, 360, 361, 362, 363b, 364a, 365, 366, 367b, 368, 369, 370, 371, 372, 373 Part II: Six Sonatas for two Oboes and Bass: HWV 380, 381, 382, 383, 384, 385 Part III: Nine Sonatas for two Violins &c and Bass: (Note that the Opus 2 numbering given below is considered the modern numbering, and not the opus numbers implied by Chrysander—which tend to be out by one.) HWV 386b (Op.2 No.1), 386a, 387 (Op.2 No.2), 392, 388 (Op.2 No.3), 389 (Op.2 No.4), 390a (Op.2 No.5), 391 (Op.2 No.6), 393, 394 Part IV: Six Sonatas for two Violins &c and Bass: (The following are considered to be the Opus 5 works Nos. 1–7.) HWV 396, 397, 398, 399, 400, 401, 402
XXVIII	12 Orgel – Concerte mit Orchester-Begleitung	1 Aug 1868	The society	Concerto	158	Contains the score (on 140 pages) of twelve organ concertos (the six organ concertos comprising the "Opus 4" set, and the six organ concertos comprising the "Opus 7" set). The following works appear in the volume: Opus 4: HWV 289, 290, 291, 292, 293, 294 Opus 7: HWV 306, 307, 308, 309, 310, 311
XXIX	Debora	1 Mar 1869	The society	Oratorio	292	Contains the score (on 243 pages) for the oratorio Deborah (HWV 51). The score contains an eight-page appendix. Contains the text of the work (also in English).
XXX	12 Grosse Concerte	20 Dec 1869	The society	Concerto	185	Contains the score (on 180 pages) of twelve concerti grossi (the "Opus 6" set). The following works appear in the publication: Opus 6 (1–12): HWV 319, 320, 321, 322, 323, 324, 325, 326, 327, 328, 329, 330
XXXI	Utrechter Te Deum und Jubilate	1 Dec 1869	The society	Canticle	95	Contains the score (on 87 pages) of the "Utrecht" Te Deum (HWV 278) and the score of the Utrecht" Jubilate (HWV 279). On page 44 is a reproduction of the last page of the Te Deum, in Handel's handwriting.
XXXII	Italienische Duette und Trios	1 May 1870	The society	Duets and Trios	122	Contains the score (on 109 pages) of thirteen Italian Duets and two Italian Trios. The 1870 edition of the volume was a subset of the 1880 edition. All text of the works is given in both German and Italian (except for duet XIII which only has the Italian text against the score). The works included in the volume are: Duets: HWV 194, 198, 184, 180, 199, 178, 191, 196, 185, 197, 188, 183 (spurious), 193 Trios: HWV 201a, 200
XXXII^{a}	Italienische Duette und Trios	1 Aug 1880	The society	Duets and Trios	190	Contains the score (on 175 pages) of twenty-two Italian Duets and two Italian Trios. The 1880 edition is labelled "XXXIIa" (with the "a" being hand-written on the title page). All text of the works is given in both German and Italian. The 1880 edition of the volume was a superset of the 1870 edition and contains the following: Duets: HWV 182a, 182b, 183 (spurious), 187, 194, 198, 184, 180, 199, 178, 191, 196, 185, 197, 188, 193, 192, 189, 190, 181, 186, 179 Trios: HWV 201a, 200
XXXIII	Alexander Balus	1 Jun 1870	The society	Oratorio	233	Contains the score (on 213 pages) for the oratorio Alexander Balus (HWV 65). Contains the text of the work (also in English).
XXXIV	Psalmen – Erster Band	1 Feb 1871	The society	Anthem (Psalm)	315	Contains the score (on 288 pages) for nine anthems (based on Psalms). The first (German: erster) of three volumes containing Psalm anthems. Contains the text of the works (also in English). With the exception of anthem V^{B}, all in the volume are considered part of the Chandos Anthems. The volume contains the following works: Anthem I: HWV 246; anthem II: HWV 247; Anthem III: HWV 248; Anthem IV: HWV 249^{b}; Anthem V^{A}: HWV 250^{a}; Anthem V^{B}: HWV 250^{b}; Anthem VI^{A}: HWV 251^{b}; Anthem VI^{B}: HWV 251^{c}; Anthem VI^{C}: HWV 251^{a}
XXXV	Psalmen – Zweiter Band	16 Oct 1871	The society	Anthem (Psalm)	314	Contains the score (on 300 pages) for six anthems (based on Psalms). The second (German: zweiter) of three volumes containing Psalm anthems. Contains the text of the works (also in English). The first five anthems in the volume are considered part of the Chandos Anthems. The volume contains the following works: Anthem VII: HWV 252; Anthem VIII: HWV 253; Anthem IX: HWV 254; Anthem X: HWV 255; Anthem XI^{A}: HWV 256^{a}; Anthem XI^{B}: HWV 256^{b}
XXXVI	Psalmen – Dritter Band	1 May 1872	The society	Anthem (Psalm)	269	Contains the score (on 247 pages) for seven anthems (based on Psalms). The third (German: dritter) of three volumes containing Psalm anthems. Contains the text of the works (also in English). The last two anthems in the volume are placed in an appendix. The volume contains the following works: Anthem XII: HWV 257 (spurious); Anthem XIII (Wedding Anthem.^{A}): HWV 262; Anthem XIV (Wedding Anthem.^{B}): HWV 263; Dettingen Anthem: HWV 265; Foundling Hospital Anthem XVI: HWV 268; Anthem IV^{A}: HWV 249^{a}; Anthem VI^{D}: HWV 251^{d}
XXXVII	Drei Te Deum	20 Dec 1872	The society	Canticle	150	Contains the score (on 138 pages) of three works: the "Queen Caroline" Te Deum (HWV 280), the "Chandos" Te Deum (HWV 281), and another Te Deum (HWV 282). Contains the text of the works (also in English).
XXXVIII	Lateinische Kirchenmusik	20 Dec 1872	The society	Church Music (Latin)	184	Contains the score (on 172 pages) of seven works of Latin Church Music: I. Psalmus^{A} (Laudate pueri Dominum): HWV 236; II. Psalmus^{B} (Laudate pueri Dominum): HWV 237; III. Psalmus (Dixit Dominus): HWV 232; IV. Psalmus (Nisi Dominus): HWV 238; V. Salve Regina (HWV 241); VI. Motetto: HWV 242; VII. Alleluja Amen (I: HWV 272, II: HWV 273, III: HWV 274, IV: HWV 270, V: HWV 269, VI: HWV 271)
XXXIX	La Resurrezione	20 Apr 1878	The society	Oratorio	100	Contains the score (on 78 pages) of the oratorio La resurrezione (The resurrection) (HWV 47). A very brief foreword is also printed in English. Contains the text of the work (also in Italian).
XL	Esther – Erste Bearbeitung	20 Apr 1882	The society	Oratorio	160	Contains the score (on 139 pages) of the oratorio (masque) Esther (HWV 50a). Chrysander prints that the published version of the work was composed in 1720 (when it was probably 1718). Erste Bearbeitung meaning first revision. Contains the text of the work (also in English).
XLI	Esther – Zweite Bearbeitung	15 Dec 1882	The society	Oratorio	203	Contains the score (on 172 pages) of the oratorio Esther (HWV 50b). Contains an extensive foreword (also in English) about the differences between 50a and 50b (composed in 1732). Zweite Bearbeitung meaning second revision. Contains the text of the work (also in English).
XLII	Joseph	15 Nov 1883	The society	Oratorio	286	Contains the score (on 260 pages) of the oratorio Joseph (HWV 59). Contains the text of the work (also in English). The foreword is also in English. The score includes a one-page appendix.
XLIII	Gelegenheits-Oratorium	11 Nov 1884	The society	Oratorio	286	Contains the score (on 267 pages) of the oratorio An Occasional Oratorio (HWV 62). Contains the text of the work (also in English). The foreword is also in English.
XLIV	Jephtha	31 May 1886	The society	Oratorio	289	Contains the score (on 260 pages) of the oratorio Jephtha (HWV 70). Contains the text of the work (also in English). The foreword is also in English.
XLIVa	Jephtha	15 Feb 1885	The society	Oratorio	276	Contains the score (manuscript facsimile) (on 268 pages) of the oratorio Jephtha (HWV 70). Contains the score in Handel's original handwritting.
XLV	Der Messias	1902	Chrysander	Oratorio	334	Contains the score (band 45) (on 317 pages) of the oratorio Messiah (HWV 56). Contains the text of the work (also in English). The foreword is also in English. Published by Max Seiffert after Chrysander's death (in 1901) but based on Chrysander's work.
XLVa	Messiah	1 Aug 1892	Chrysander	Oratorio	350	Contains the score (band 45a) (on 330 pages) of the oratorio Messiah (HWV 56). The foreword is also in English. Contains the score in Handel's original handwritting.
XLVIa	Ode für den Geburtstag der Königin Anna	Aug 1887	Chrysander	Ode	70	Contains the score (on 54 pages) of the oratorio Ode for the Birthday of Queen Anne (HWV 74). Contains the text of the work (also in English). The foreword is also in English.
XLVIb	Alceste	11 Nov 1887	Chrysander	Masque	100	Contains the score (on 87 pages) of the masque Alceste (HWV 45). Contains the text of the work (also in English). The foreword is also in English. The work contains a four-page appendix.
XLVII	Wasserwerksmusik, Feuerwerksmusik Concerte und Doppelconcerte für grosses Orchester	11 Nov 1886	Chrysander	Concerto	291	Contains the score (on 241 pages) of eight concertos including the various Water Music suites and the Music for the Royal Fireworks. The title of the volume translates as "Water music, fireworks, music concerts, and double concertos for large orchestra". The works contained in the volume are: Concerto in F major (HWV 331); Suite in F major: Water – Music (HWV 348, HWV 349, HWV 350). Note: Chrysander published in one suite what is now divided into three; Concerto A in F major (HWV 335^{b}), and Concerto B in D major (HWV 335^{a}). Note: these two concerti are versions of the overture to the Fireworks suite; Suite in D major: Firework – Music (HWV 351); Concerti a due cori I, II, and III (HWV 332, HWV 333, and HWV 334)
XLVIII	Sammlung verschiedener Instrumental-Werke für Orgel und Klavier, Orchester-und Kammer-Musik	1 Sep 1894	Chrysander	Instrumental	264	Contains the score (on 247 pages) of a great deal of instrumental music. The title of the volume translates as "Collection of instrumental works for organ and piano, orchestral and chamber music". The works contained in the volume are: Erste Abtheilung (First Division): Concerto I (HWV 295); Concerto II (HWV 296a); Concerti III-VI (keyboard reductions of HWV 328, 319, 323, 324); Concerto (HWV 303); Concerto (HWV 304); Concerto (HWV 305); Zweite Abtheilung (Second Division): Overture to Oreste (HWV A^{11}); Overture to Alessandro Severo (HWV A^{13}); Overture to Trionfo del Tempo (HWV 336); Sonata for viola da gamba (spurious); Sonata VI (HWV 364a); Sonata XVI (HWV 374); Sonata XVII (HWV 375); Sonata XVIII (HWV 376); Allegro (HWV 340); Minuet (? but one of the ones in the range 532–543); Largo (? HWV 342); March (HWV ?); March (HWV ?); Hornpipe (HWV 356); Dritte Abtheilung (Third Division): Suite – allemande and sarabande only (HWV 440); Suite – sarabande only (HWV 439); Suite – prelude only (HWV 437); Sonatina – sonatina only (HWV 475); Suite (HWV 449); Suite a Deux Clavecins (HWV 446); Suite (HWV 571); Suite (HWV 448); Partita (spurious); Sechs kleine Fugen (spurious); Lesson (?spurious); Overture to Pastor Fido (HWV 8); Aria from Radamisto (HWV 12); Aria from Rinaldo (HWV 7); 38 pages of William Babell's keyboard arrangement of the overture and nine arias from Rinaldo.
XLIX	—	—	—	—		No publication was made.
L	Cantate a voce solo e basso (Libro Primo)	1 Aug 1887	Chrysander	Cantata	204	Contains the score (on 188 pages) of 38 cantatas for solo voice and figured bass (note that cantata 6 is divided into HWV 91a and HWV 91b). The foreword is also in English. The following HWV numbers appear in the publication: HWV 77, 80, 84, 88, 90, 91a, 91b, 93, 102a, 100, 103, 104, 106, 107, 108, 109a, 109b, 111a, 111b, 112, 114, 115, 116, 120b, 121b, 127a, 127b, 125b, 126c, 128, 129, 130, 131, 132c, 132a, 135b, 136a, 137, 133
LI	Cantate a voce solo e basso (Libro Secondo)	11 Nov 1887	Chrysander	Cantata	186	Contains the score (on 172 pages) of 35 cantatas for solo voice and figured bass. The foreword is also in English. The following HWV numbers appear in the publication: HWV 138, 139a, 139b, 139c, 141, 146, 144, 145, 147, 148, 151, 152, 153, 156, 157, 160a, 160b, 160c, 161a, 161b, 158a, 158b, 159, 162, 163, 164a, 167a, 168, 169, 172, 174, 175, 176, 177, 118
LII^{A}	Cantate con strumenti (Libro Primo)	20 Aug 1888	Chrysander	Cantata	192	Contains the score (on 178 pages) of 15 cantatas for voice and instruments. The following HWV numbers appear in the publication: HWV 78, 81, 83, 119, 166, 89, 87, 124, 92, 97, 98, 99, 105, 110, 113
LII^{B}	Cantate con strumenti (Libro Secondo)	15 Aug 1889	Chrysander	Cantata	174	Contains the score (on 159 pages) of 9 cantatas and 4 fragments for voice and instruments. The foreword is also in English. The following HWV numbers appear in the publication: HWV: 122, 134, 140, 143, 165, 170, 171, 173, 96, The publication has an appendix with the following four cantata fragments: HWV: a fragment with no HWV number (but added to Arresta il passo), 230, 132b, 123
LIII	Aci, Galatea, e Polifemo. Serenata	1 Apr 1892	Chrysander	Serenade	118	Contains the score (on 100 pages) for the dramatic cantata (serenade) Aci, Galatea e Polifemo (HWV 72). The foreword is also in English. Contains the text of the work (also in English).
LIV	Parnasso in Festa. Serenata	20 Apr 1878	The Society	Serenade	146	Contains the score (on 136 pages) for the serenade Parnasso in Festa (HWV 73). The brief foreword is also in English. Contains the text of the work (also in English).
LV	Almira	1 Aug 1873	The Society	Opera	132	Contains the score (on 119 pages) for the opera Almira (HWV 1). The brief foreword is also in English. Contains the text of the work (in the score).
LVI	Rodrigo	1 Aug 1873	The Society	Opera	113	Contains the score (on 96 pages) for the opera Rodrigo (HWV 5). The brief foreword is also in English. Contains the text of the work (in the score).
LVII	Agrippina	1 Jan 1874	The Society	Opera	154	Contains the score (on 139 pages) for the opera Agrippina (HWV 6). The brief foreword is also in English. Contains the text of the work (in the score).
LVIII	Rinaldo	1 Jan 1874	The Society	Opera	130	Contains the score (on 115 pages) for the opera Rinaldo (HWV 7a). The brief foreword is also in English. Contains the text of the work (in the score).
LVIIIa	Rinaldo	1 Oct 1894	Chrysander	Opera	230	Contains the score (on 214 pages) for the opera Rinaldo (contains both the HWV 7a and HWV 7b versions). The foreword is also in English. Contains the text of the work (in the score).
LIX	Il Pastor Fido	1 Aug 1876	The Society	Opera	88	Contains the score (on 72 pages) for the opera Il Pastor Fido (HWV 8a). The brief foreword is also in English. Contains the text of the work (in the score).
LX	Teseo	1 Aug 1874	The Society	Opera	126	Contains the score (on 112 pages) for the opera Teseo (HWV 9). The brief foreword is also in English. Contains the text of the work (in the score). The score includes a one-page appendix.
LXI	Silla	30 Jan 1875	The Society	Opera	74	Contains the score (on 59 pages) for the opera Silla (HWV 10). The brief foreword is also in English. Contains the text of the work (in the score).
LXII	Amadigi	1 Aug 1874	The Society	Opera	114	Contains the score (on 100 pages) for the opera Amadigi di Gaula (HWV 11). The brief foreword is also in English. Contains the text of the work (in the score).
LXIII	Radamisto	30 Jan 1875	The Society	Opera	222	Contains the score (on 207 pages) for the opera Radimisto (HWV 12). The brief foreword is also in English. Contains the text of the work (in the score).
LXIV	Muzio Scevola	1 Aug 1874	The Society	Opera	86	Contains the score (on 72 pages) for the opera Muzio Scevola (HWV 13). The brief foreword is also in English. Contains the text of the work (in the score).
LXV	Floridante	15 Jan 1876	The Society	Opera	152	Contains the score (on 131 pages) for the opera Floridante (HWV 14). The brief foreword is also in English. Contains the text of the work (in the score). The score includes a seven-page appendix.
LXVI	Ottone	16 Oct 1881	The Society	Opera	158	Contains the score (on 144 pages) for the opera Ottone (HWV 15). Contains the text of the work (in the score). The score includes a twenty-one page appendix.
LXVII	Flavio	1 Aug 1875	The Society	Opera	96	Contains the score (on 88 pages) for the opera Flavio (HWV 16). The brief foreword is also in English. Contains the text of the work (in the score).
LXVIII	Giulio Cesare	1 Aug 1875	The Society	Opera	164	Contains the score (on 156 pages) for the opera Giulio Cesare (HWV 17). The brief foreword is also in English. Contains the text of the work (in the score).
LXIX	Tamerlano	1 Aug 1876	The Society	Opera	170	Contains the score (on 156 pages) for the opera Tamerlano (HWV 18). The brief foreword is also in English. Contains the text of the work (in the score). The score includes a twelve-page appendix.
LXX	Rodelinda	15 Jan 1876	The Society	Opera	138	Contains the score (on 123 pages) for the opera Rodelinda (HWV 19). The brief foreword is also in English. Contains the text of the work (in the score). The score includes a fifteen-page appendix.
LXXI	Scipione	1 Apr 1877	The Society	Opera	154	Contains the score (on 135 pages) for the opera Scipione (HWV 20). The brief foreword is also in English. Contains the text of the work (in the score). The score includes a nineteen-page appendix.
LXXII	Alessandro	1 Apr 1877	The Society	Opera	150	Contains the score (on 136 pages) for the opera Alessandro (HWV 21). The brief foreword is also in English. Contains the text of the work (in the score). The score includes a four-page appendix.
LXXIII	Admeto	1 Oct 1877	The Society	Opera	142	Contains the score (on 128 pages) for the opera Admeto (HWV 22). The brief foreword is also in English. Contains the text of the work (in the score). The score includes an eight-page appendix.
LXXIV	Riccardo Primo	1 Oct 1877	The Society	Opera	140	Contains the score (on 127 pages) for the opera Riccardo Primo (HWV 23). The brief foreword is also in English. Contains the text of the work (in the score). The score includes a three-page appendix.
LXXV	Siroe	1 Oct 1878	The Society	Opera	118	Contains the score (on 104 pages) for the opera Siroe (HWV 24). The brief foreword is also in English. Contains the text of the work (in the score).
LXXVI	Tolomeo	1 Oct 1878	The Society	Opera	110	Contains the score (on 95 pages) for the opera Tolomeo (HWV 25). The brief foreword is also in English. Contains the text of the work (in the score). The score includes a seven-page appendix.
LXXVII	Lotario	1 Aug 1879	The Society	Opera	138	Contains the score (on 124 pages) for the opera Lotario (HWV 26). The brief foreword is also in English. Contains the text of the work (in the score).
LXXVIII	Partenope	1 Aug 1879	The Society	Opera	136	Contains the score (on 126 pages) for the opera Partenope (HWV 27). The brief foreword is also in English. Contains the text of the work (in the score).
LXXIX	Poro	15 Apr 1880	The Society	Opera	132	Contains the score (on pages) for the opera Poro (HWV 28). The brief foreword is also in English. Contains the text of the work (in the score). The score includes a twenty-two page appendix.
LXXX	Ezio	15 Apr 1880	The Society	Opera	130	Contains the score (on 116 pages) for the opera Ezio (HWV 29). The brief foreword is also in English. Contains the text of the work (in the score).
LXXXI	Sosarme	1 Aug 1880	The Society	Opera	126	Contains the score (on 112 pages) for the opera Sosarme (HWV 30). The brief foreword is also in English. Contains the text of the work (in the score).
LXXXII	Orlando	1 Apr 1881	The Society	Opera	127	Contains the score (on 112 pages) for the opera Orlando (HWV 31). Contains the text of the work (in the score).
LXXXIII	Arianna	1 Apr 1881	The Society	Opera	130	Contains the score (on 119 pages) for the opera Arianna (HWV 32). Contains the text of the work (in the score).
LXXXIV	Terpsicore, Prologo, e la secondo versione dell Opera Il Pastor Fido	11 Nov 1890	Chrysander	Opera	134	Contains the score (on 115 pages) for the opera Il pastor fido (HWV 8b and HWV 8c). The foreword is also in English. Contains the text of the work (in the score).
LXXXV	Ariodante	16 Oct 1881	The Society	Opera	154	Contains the score (on 143 pages) for the opera Ariodante (HWV 33). Contains the text of the work (in the score).
LXXXVI	Alcina	1 Aug 1868	The Society	Opera	160	Contains the score (on 150 pages) for the opera Alcina (HWV 34). The brief foreword is also in English. Contains the text of the work (in the score).
LXXXVII	Atalanta	15 Apr 1882	The Society	Opera	102	Contains the score (on 92 pages) for the opera Atalanta (HWV 35). The brief foreword is also in English. Contains the text of the work (in the score).
LXXXVIII	Giustino	15 Apr 1883	The Society	Opera	130	Contains the score (on 119 pages) for the opera Giustino (HWV 37). The brief foreword is also in English. Contains the text of the work (in the score).
LXXXIX	Arminio	15 Oct 1882	The Society	Opera	115	Contains the score (on 104 pages) for the opera Arminio (HWV 36). The brief foreword is also in English. Contains the text of the work (in the score).
XC	Berenice	15 Apr 1883	The Society	Opera	114	Contains the score (on 104 pages) for the opera Berenice (HWV 38). The brief foreword is also in English. Contains the text of the work (in the score). The score includes a five-page appendix.
XCI	Faramondo	15 Apr 1884	The Society	Opera	138	Contains the score (on 128 pages) for the opera Faramondo (HWV 39). The brief foreword is also in English. Contains the text of the work (in the score).
XCII	Serse	15 Apr 1884	The Society	Opera	127	Contains the score (on 123 pages) for the opera Serse (HWV 40). The brief foreword is also in English. Contains the text of the work (in the score).
XCIII	Imeneo	8 Jul 1885	The Society	Opera	124	Contains the score (on 112 pages) for the opera Imeneo (HWV 41). Contains the text of the work (in the score).
XCIV	Deidamia	8 Jul 1885	The Society	Opera	154	Contains the score (on 144 pages) for the opera Deidamia (HWV 42). Contains the text of the work (in the score).
Suppl. 1	Manificat von D. Erba	1 Aug 1888	Chrysander	Magnificat	74	Contains the score (on 64 pages) taken from a manuscript inscribed "Magnificat del R^{d}. Sig^{r}. Erba". Also contains two pages of hand-written manuscript. It is unclear whether the work is by Handel or whether Handel "borrowed" the work.
Suppl. 2	Te Deum von Francesco Antonio Urio	9 Feb 1902	Chrysander	Te Deum	168	Contains the score (on 160 pages) of a Te Deum by Francesco Antonio Urio. Published by Max Seiffert after Chrysander's death (in 1901) but based on Chrysander's work. Handel made use of parts of the Te Deum in several of his own works (including Israel in Egypt and the Dettingen Te Deum).
Suppl. 3	Serenata von Alessandro Stradella	15 Aug 1888	Chrysander	Serenata	64	Contains the score (on 56 pages) of a serenata by Alessandro Stradella. Contains the text of the work (in the score).
Suppl. 4	Fünf italienische Duette von Giovanni Carlo Maria Clari	28 Feb 1892	Chrysander	Duets	91	Contains the score (on 84 pages) of five Italian vocal duets with keyboard accompaniment by Giovanni Carlo Maria Clari.
Suppl. 5	Componimenti Musicali per il Cembalo von Gottlieb Muffat	16 Oct 1895	Chrysander	Keyboard	186	Contains the score (on 165 pages) of Musical compositions for the harpsichord by Gottlieb Muffat. The volume contains seven main compositions and a two-page work entitled Particolari Segni delle Maniere. The volume contains seven pages of elaborate introduction in landscape format.
Suppl. 6	Octavia von Reinhard Keiser	31 May 1902	Chrysander	Opera	226	Contains the score (on 216 pages) of the opera Octavia by Reinhard Keiser. Published by Max Seiffert after Chrysander's death (in 1901) but based on Chrysander's work. Contains the text of the work (in the score).

== Unpublished ==
The following lists most of the HWV numbers not included in the Händelgesellschaft volumes:

Genre	HWV numbers not included in the Händelgesellschaft volumes
Opera	2, 3, 4, A2, A5, A11 and A13 (only the overtures published in volume 48), A14
Incidental music	43, 44, 218
Oratorio	46a
Cantata	79, 82, 85, 86, 94, 95, 102b, 117, 120a, 121a, 125a, 126a, 126b, 127c, 132d, 135a, 136b, 142, 149, 150, 154, 155, 158c, 161c, 164b, 167b, 177
Hymn	202, 203, 204, 205, 206, 207, 208, 209, 210, 269, 270, 271, 272, 273, 274, 275, 276, 277, 284, 285, 286
Italian aria	211, 212, 213, 214, 215, 216, 217, 219, 220, 221, 222, 223, 224, 225, 227
English song	226, 228 (1 to 24)
German church cantata	229 (1 to 7)
Italian sacred cantata	233, 234
Latin church music	231, 235, 239, 240, 243, 244, 245, 276, 277
Anthem	251e, 266, 267
Concerto	296b, 297, 298, 299, 300, 343
Concerto Grosso	331, 331-1, 331-2
Orchestral	337, 338, 339, 341, 344, 345, 347, 352, 353, 354, 355, 413
Solo sonata	357, 358, 359a, 359b, 363a, 364b, 377, 378, 406, 407, 408, 409, 412, 419 (1 to 6), 420, 421
Trio sonata	390b, 395, 403, 404, 405
Wind ensemble	346, 410, 411, 414, 415, 416, 417, 418, 422, 423, 424
Keyboard	305b, 425, 443, 444, 445, 450, 451, 453, 454, 455, 456 (1 to 5), 457, 458, 459, 460, 461, 462, 463, 464, 465, 466, 467, 468, 469, 470, 471, 472, 473, 474, 476, 477, 478, 479, 480, 482 (1 to 4), 484, 486, 487, 488, 489, 491, 492, 493, 495, 559, 560, 561, 562, 563, 564, 565, 566, 567, 568, 569, 570, 572, 573, 576, 579, 580, 581, 582, 583, 584, 586, 587, 588, 589, 590, 591, 592, 593, 594, 595, 596, 597, 598, 599, 600, 601, 601, 603, 604, 611, 612, A15 (1 to 37)

== See also ==
- Händel-Werke-Verzeichnis (HWV)
- Hallische Händel-Ausgabe (HHA)
- Publications by Friedrich Chrysander
- List of compositions by George Frideric Handel
