= Vittoria Tarquini =

Italian opera singer (1670–1746)

Vittoria Tarquini (3 March 1670 – 1746), also known as La Bombace and Bambagia, was an Italian soprano singer of the Baroque era. She was one of the most celebrated singers of her time and was considered one of the best, if not the greatest, tragic opera singer.

== Career ==
Born in the parish of San Pantalon in Venice, Tarquini had her first known performance in 1685, aged 14, at the Teatro San Angelo there. According to Beth Glixon, she was probably the victim of a rape that same year because Vittoria's father brought a charge of rape a few months later before the three chiefs of the Council of Ten; it is not known what ultimately became of the case.

In 1688, her career reached a first peak when she sang the role of Giulia in the premiere of the opera Orazio on 24 January 1688 in Venice at the Teatro San Giovanni Grisostomo, which was probably composed by Giuseppe Felice Tosi. Around the same time she met Ferdinando de' Medici (1663–1713), who would later become very important in her life. The music-loving Ferdinando was often a guest at the palace of Vincenzo Grimani, and accompanied Tarquini himself at a private concert on harpsichord or spinet. Already at this time he is said to have shown an inclination for Vittoria, to whom he gave a ring worth 20 doppie (doubloons). However, it is not certain whether Vittoria is also identical with the brava cantatrice (outstanding singer) to whom Ferdinando gave a diamond worth more than 100 scudi after a concert at Grimani. On 14 February 1688, also at San Giovanni Grisostomo, she sang the role of Angelica in Domenico Gabrielli's Carlo il Grande.

On 30 January 1689 she appeared in the premiere of Agostino Steffani's Henrico Leone, together with the tenor Antonio Borosini, Giuseppe Galloni "Nicolini". On 8 January 1689, three weeks before the premiere of Henrico Leone, she married Jean-Baptiste Farinelli, Kapellmeister (or first violinist) of Ernest Augustus, Elector of Hanover, in St. Clement's Basilica, Hanover. She probably stayed in Germany and with her husband for a few more years and also appeared in Steffani's La lotta d'Ercole ed Acheloo (1689), but this has not yet been proven.

Around 1691–92, she gave birth to her only son, Giorgio Luigi Farinelli, possibly already in Venice, having left her husband.

In 1693, she was in Ferrara at the Teatro Bonacossi and sang in a performance of Bernardo Pasquini's Lisimaco alongside the famous castrato Domenico Cecchi called il Cortona; she was announced with the Italianized surname of her husband as Vittoria Farinelli.

She was in Florence by March 1698, in the service of Ferdinando de' Medici, whom she had met in Venice ten years previously. During her Florentine years, she also had a very friendly relationship with Cardinal Francesco Maria de' Medici.

She sang in Handel's operas Rodrigo (Florence 1707) and Agrippina (Venice 1709); John Mainwaring also vaguely but bluntly suggests that she was in love with Handel, and that they may have had an affair, despite the relatively large 15-year age difference (and despite their alleged relationship with Ferdinando de' Medici).

After her career, Tarquini lived in Venice in her house in the parish of Santa Maria Formosa that she had bought in 1705. Her husband Jean Baptiste Farinelli, from whom she was separated for more than 20 years, came to Venice in 1714 and lived with her again until his death in 1725. In 1744, Vittoria Tarquini made her will, making her son Luigi her main heir. She died in Venice in 1746.
