= Friedrich Chrysander =

German musicologist (1826–1901)

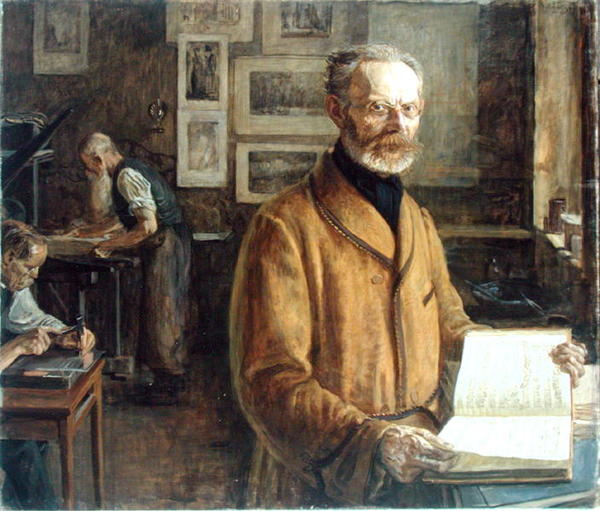
Friedrich Chrysander; portrait by Leopold von Kalckreuth (1901)

Karl Franz Friedrich Chrysander (8 July 1826 – 3 September 1901) was a German music historian, critic and publisher, whose edition of the works of George Frideric Handel and authoritative writings on many other composers established him as a pioneer of 19th-century musicology.

== Biography ==
Born at Lübtheen, in Mecklenburg-Schwerin, Chrysander was the son of a miller. He earned a Doctorate in Philosophy from the University of Rostock in 1853. He then focused his studies on music, and in an obituary for Chrysander in October 1901, the Musical Times said of him that

"From the beginning he assumed the role of an historian in rigorously defending the right and claims of musical masterpieces of a distant past to a legitimate and faithful reproduction, i.e., without modernising, and without instrumental or vocal additions."

Chrysander is also credited with rediscovering the autograph score of Johann Sebastian Bach's Mass in B Minor, which he then sold to the Royal Library in Berlin, generously doing so only for the same sum that he himself paid for it.

He also edited the music of many other composers, including (in collaboration with Johannes Brahms) the collected harpsichord music of François Couperin le Grand, published from 1871 to 1888.

Chrysander took a leading role in the editing and publication of Denkmäler der Tonkunst (1869-1871).

His grandson was George Volkert, aircraft designer of the Handley Page Halifax.

== Publications ==
Between 1858 and 1902, the Händel-Gesellschaft or "German Handel Society" edition of Handel's collected works was published, and this was almost entirely the work of Chrysander; however, Julius Rietz prepared the first volume (with results that were much to Chrysander's dissatisfaction), and Max Seiffert also assisted with some of the later editing. Early in the publication of the edition, the publisher dropped out of the project, after which Chrysander set up an engraving shop at his home and produced subsequent volumes himself. Additionally, he sold fruit and vegetables raised in his garden as a way of bringing in further income during the publication years.

The quality of some of the editing has been challenged in subsequent decades, with one writer calling the Händel-Gesellschaft edition "anything but complete and reliable" and another criticizing Chrysander's "arbitrary selection of material in the more complex works and his failure to explain his methods." Nevertheless, this publication, which produced over 100 volumes of music, is acknowledged to have been a remarkable achievement for its day.

== See also ==
- List of compositions by George Frideric Handel
