= Hallische Händel-Ausgabe =

Collection of works by George Frideric Handel

The set of volumes in the Halle Handel Edition.

The Hallische Händel-Ausgabe ("Halle Handel Edition") is a multi-volume collection of the works of George Frideric Handel. It was first published in the 1950s: initially as an adjunct to the HG edition, but by 1958 as a collected edition in its own right. The collection's abbreviation of "HHA" can be used to identify individual works by Handel, for example Handel's Messiah can be referred to as "HHA i/17" (with the Roman numeral "i" designating "series 1"). For practical use, the HHA numbering of Handel's works has been superseded by the HWV numbering system.

Published by the George Frideric Handel Society, a major new edition comprising approximately 128 volumes is being released. It is expected to be completed by 2023 in the following configuration:

Series	Description	Volumes
I	Oratorios and Large Cantatas	32
II	Operas	41
III	Church Music	14
IV	Instrumental Music	19
V	Shorter Vocal Works	7
VI	Supplement	6
VII	Handel Handbook	5

== See also ==
- Händel-Gesellschaft (HG)
- Händel-Werke-Verzeichnis (HWV)
- List of compositions by George Frideric Handel
