= Händel-Werke-Verzeichnis =

Catalogue of George Friederic Handel's Works

The Händel-Werke-Verzeichnis (abbreviated as HWV) is the Catalogue of Handel's Works. It was published in three volumes (in German) by Bernd Baselt between 1978 and 1986, and lists every piece of music known to have been written by George Frideric Handel. The catalogue also includes the first few bars of each piece and large amounts of factual information including manuscript sources, early prints, photographs, spurious works, etc. The catalogue does not include the full scores of Handel's works (for the full scores, see Händel-Gesellschaft and Hallische Händel-Ausgabe).

== Numbering ==
The HWV thematic catalogue serves as the modern numbering system for Handel's compositions. For example, Handel's Messiah is numbered as HWV 56. The HWV numbers range from 1 to 612, however they do not represent a global date-ordering of composition; i.e. HWV 1 is not Handel's first work, nor is HWV 612 his last. Instead, the HWV numbers group works into musical categories, and provide a good ordering of the date of composition within each category. The following table lists the categories and the HWV number ranges.

Volume	HWV numbers	Category
Vol. 01	1–42	Operas
Vol. 02	43–45, 218	Incidental music
Vol. 03	46–48, 50–71	Oratorios
Vol. 04	49, 72–76	Odes and masques
Vol. 05	77–177	Cantatas
Vol. 06	178–199	Italian duets
Vol. 07	200, 201	Italian trios
Vol. 08	202–210, 284–286	Hymns
Vol. 09	211–217, 219–225, 227	Italian arias
Vol. 10	226, 228	English songs
Vol. 11	229	German church cantatas
Vol. 12	230, 233, 234	Italian sacred cantatas
Vol. 13	231, 232, 235–245, 269–274, 276, 277	Latin church music
Vol. 14	246–268	Anthems
Vol. 15	278–283	Canticles
Vol. 16	287–311, 343	Concertos
Vol. 17	312–335	Concerti grossi
Vol. 18	336–342, 344-345, 347–356, 413	Orchestral works
Vol. 19	357–379, 406–409, 412, 419–421	Solo sonatas
Vol. 20	380–405	Trio sonatas
Vol. 21	346, 410, 411, 414–418, 422–424	Wind ensemble works
Vol. 22	305b, 425–612	Keyboard works
Vol. 23	A1, A3, A4, A6–A9, A10, A12	Arrangements by other composers
Vol. 24	Deest	Works not in the HWV catalogue

There are gaps and anomalies in the HWV numbering system, so the above table is only useful as a guide (see the List of compositions by George Frideric Handel for more details).

The HWV numbers do not imply that Handel wrote exactly 612 works. The combination of unnumbered works, lost works, misattributed works, spurious works, variants (e.g. HWV 251 a–d), grouped works (e.g. HWV 229 1–7), and arrangements (e.g. HWV 482 1–4), all render meaningless the determination of the exact number of Handel's compositions.
