= Gloucestershire Militia =

Auxiliary force of the British Army

The Gloucestershire Militia was a part-time military force in the county of Gloucestershire in the West of England. From their formal organisation as Trained Bands in 1558 until their final service as a Special Reserve unit of the Gloucestershire Regiment in World War I, the Militia regiments of the county served in home defence in all of Britain's major wars.

== Background ==
The English Militia was descended from the Anglo-Saxon Fyrd, the military force raised from the freemen of the shires under command of their Sheriff. It continued under the Norman kings, notably at the Battle of the Standard (1138). The force was reorganised under the Assizes of Arms of 1181 and 1252, and again by King Edward I's Statute of Winchester of 1285. Now Commissioners of Array would levy the required number of men from each shire. The usual shire contingent was 1000 infantry commanded by a millenar, divided into companies of 100 commanded by centenars or constables, and subdivided into sections of 20 led by vintenars. Edward I regularly summoned the shire levies of Gloucestershire to fight in neighbouring Wales during his Welsh Wars, but they were not required for his Scottish campaigns. However, his grandson Edward III, did employ the Gloucestershire levies in Scotland, for example at the Siege of Berwick and Battle of Halidon Hill in 1333. Rather than 1000 men, the Gloucestershire contingent serving from 23 June to 23 August 1335 was a more manageable body of 218 longbowmen (16 of them mounted), commanded by two ductores (constables) and 11 vintenars. The levies continued to be mustered under Henry VIII: a surviving muster roll of 1543 shows that the Hundred of Kiftsgate in Gloucestershire was required to find 186 bowmen and 323 billmen, of which the parish of Winchcombe provided 70 men.

== Gloucestershire Trained Bands ==
The legal basis of the militia was updated by two acts of 1557 covering musters (4 & 5 Ph. & M. c. 3) and the maintenance of horses and armour (4 & 5 Ph. & M. c. 2). The county militia was now under the Lord Lieutenant appointed by the monarch, assisted by the Deputy Lieutenants and Justices of the Peace. The entry into force of these Acts in 1558 is seen as the starting date for the organised county militia in England. Although the militia obligation was universal, it was clearly impractical to train and equip every able-bodied man, so after 1572 the practice was to select a proportion of men for the Trained Bands, who were mustered for regular training. Although the Trained Bands were exempt from foreign service, they were frequently employed in Ireland, Gloucestershire again providing large contingents.

When war broke out with Spain in 1583, training and equipping the militia became a priority. Counties were organised into groups for training purposes, with emphasis on the invasion-threatened 'maritime' counties. As an inland county Gloucestershire was simply taxed in 1585 and only began serious training in 1587, when the Lord Lieutenant of Gloucestershire, Gyles Brydges, 3rd Lord Chandos, was ordered to send 1000 of his trained men to defend Wales in case of invasion. During the summer of 1588, when England was threatened by the Spanish Armada, the Gloucestershire Trained Bands assembled with 3000 infantry in 10 properly organised companies under captains, together with four troops of cavalry amounting to 235 mounted men (20 lancers, 180 light horse, and 35 armed with 'petronelles' – the Petronel was an early cavalry firearm). The county also mustered 1000 armed but untrained men. The primary role of the Gloucestershire Trained Bands was to defend the Severn Estuary, but a large detachment was sent under Sir John Tracy of Toddington to join Queen Elizabeth's main army at London:

- Captain William Brydges' Band – 300 footmen
- Captain Sir John Tracy's Band – 300 footmen
- Captain Sir Henry Poole's band – 300 footmen
- Captain Anthony Hungerford's Band – 250 footmen
- Captain Henry Winston's Band – 200 footmen
- Captain George Huntley's Band – 150 footmen
- Captain William Dutton's Band – 10 lancers, 50 light horsemen
- Captain Thomas Lucy's Band – 10 lancers, 50 light horsemen

With the passing of the threat of invasion, the Trained Bands declined in the early 17th Century, but Gloucestershire was one of the few counties to continue enrolling and training men seriously, particularly in 1608 when it was organised by county divisions under the Lord Lieutenant, Henry, 7th Lord Berkeley:

- Berkeley – 750 men under 3 captains
- The Seven Hundreds – 750 men under 3 captains
- Kiftsgate – 750 men under 3 captains
- Forest of Dean – 400 men under 2 captains
- City of Gloucester, with the Hundred of Dudston and King's Barton – 350 men under 1 captain

In 1638 the Gloucestershire Trained Bands consisted of 3120 men armed with 1826 muskets and 1294 Corslets (pikemen with armour), together with 200 horse. Gloucestershire also provided one of the largest contingents (1500 men) to the royal army for the Second Bishops' War in 1640, though like other counties many of the men sent were probably untrained hired substitutes. Charles I had attempted to reform the Trained Bands into a national force or 'Perfect Militia' answering to the king rather than local control. On 12 February 1641 a firm Royalist supporter, George Brydges, 6th Lord Chandos, was entrusted with organising the Militia of the County and City of Gloucester. The Gloucester Trained Bands may have been organised as:

- Gloucester Trained Band (possibly under Col Nathaniel Stephens, MP)
- Cirencester Trained Band under Col Arthur Forbes
- Gloucester Trained Band Horse

Control of the militia was one of the major points of dispute between Charles I and Parliament that led to the English Civil War in 1642. Elements of the Gloucester TBs may have been part of the Parliamentarian force at the skirmish at Shepton Mallet in August 1642, but with a few exceptions neither side made much use of the militia during the war beyond securing the county armouries for their own full-time troops. Gloucester, Bristol and Cirencester were all secured for Parliament early in the war by regular troops of the Western Association before they were besieged by Royalist forces (only Gloucester held out). Later in the war some Gloucester TB troops may have formed part of the Parliamentarian garrison of Sudeley Castle in 1647 under Col Richard Aylworth.

Once Parliament had established full control of the kingdom in 1648 it passed legislation to reorganise the militia in various counties, including an Ordinance to settle the Militia of Gloucester, Monmouth, Brecon and Glamorgan, and to raise forces to suppress rebellion therein on 12 May, followed by an Ordinance for settling the Militia in the City and the County of the City of Bristol on 22 June. From now on the term 'Trained Band' began to disappear in most counties. Under the Commonwealth and Protectorate the militia received pay when called out, and operated alongside the New Model Army to control the country, for example in 1650 when the bulk of the army was on campaign in Scotland. Many militia regiments were called out in 1651 during the Scottish invasion (the Worcester campaign) and the Gloucestershire were part of a concentration ordered at Gloucester.

== Gloucestershire Militia ==
After the Restoration of the Monarchy, the English Militia was re-established by The King's Sole Right over the Militia Act 1661 under the control of the king's lords-lieutenant, the men to be selected by ballot. This was popularly seen as the 'Constitutional Force' to counterbalance a 'Standing Army' tainted by association with the New Model Army that had supported Cromwell's military dictatorship. The militia of Gloucestershire were called out during the Second Anglo-Dutch War in 1666 when a French and Dutch invasion was feared.

=== Monmouth's Rebellion ===
During the Monmouth Rebellion in 1685, the Lord Lieutenant, the Duke of Beaufort, led his Gloucestershire Militia (four regiments of Foot, one of Horse and an independent company of Foot from the City of Gloucester), together with that of neighbouring Herefordshire and Monmouthshire, to join the 700-strong City of Bristol Militia and prevent that city falling into the hands of the rebels. They arrested potential rebels and then patrolled the north bank of the River Avon to prevent the rebel army moving north or crossing into Wales. The Gloucester Militia Horse may have reconnoitred as far forward as Bridgwater. Three of the regiments of Foot had mustered at Gloucester, St Briavels in the Forest of Dean, and Cirencester, and the Horse at Gloucester.

Faced with another invasion in 1688, this time by his son-in-law, William of Orange, King James II called out the militia, and a detachment of the Gloucestershires intercepted Lord Lovelace and 70 followers at Cirencester en route to join the invader. The militia made them prisoners after a sharp skirmish in which Major Lorange of the militia and his son were killed. However, most of James's regular army and many militia regiments rallied to William, whose takeover (the Glorious Revolution) was otherwise virtually bloodless.

The Gloucestershire Militia, horse and foot under the Lord Lieutenant, the Earl of Macclesfield, and Sir John Guise, 2nd Baronet of Elmore Court, were assembled for a month's summer training in 1690 during the crisis when William and the army were in Ireland and the French had won temporary command of the English Channel. However, when the French fleet failed to follow up the Battle of Beachy Head, Macclesfield and Guise were ordered to send their men to their homes to help with the harvest.

A full return of the English Militia was compiled in 1697. By then Viscount Dursley was Lord Lieutenant of both the County of Gloucestershire and the City of Bristol, and he controlled the following regiments, though there is no mention of any training being carried out:

- Regiment of Horse, 6 troops, 243 men, under Colonel Lord Dursley
- White Regiment of Foot, 10 companies, 583 men, at Gloucester under Colonel Sir John Guise, 3rd Baronet
- Green Regiment of Foot, 8 companies, 534 men, from Kiftsgate Hundred under Colonel Sir Ralph Dutton, 1st Baronet
- Blue Regiment of Foot, 9 companies, 551 men, under Colonel Sir Thomas Stephens (Note: Probably Sir Thomas Stephens of Lypiatt Park, High Sheriff of Gloucestershire and MP for Gloucestershire 1695–98, died 1708.)
- Red Regiment of Foot, 9 companies, 531 men, at St Briavels under Colonel Maynard Colchester of Westbury Court
- City of Bristol Militia, 10 companies, 727 men, under Colonel Charles Bartley

After the Treaty of Utrecht in 1713 the militia was allowed to dwindle. Nathaniel Wade, who had served as a major under Monmouth at Sedgemoor, commanded the Bristol Militia against the riotous coal miners of Kingswood in 1714, and there was a flurry of activity in Gloucestershire at the time of the Jacobite rising of 1715. Apparently, Gloucestershire organised a new battalion in 1750, with its headquarters at Bristol.

== 1757 Reforms ==
=== Seven Years War ===
Under threat of French invasion during the Seven Years' War a series of Militia Acts from 1757 re-established county militia regiments, the men being conscripted by means of parish ballots (paid substitutes were permitted) to serve for three years. Gloucestershire, including the cities of Gloucester and Bristol, was given a quota of 960 men to raise. Despite anti-ballot riots at Cirencester, Cricklade and Lechlade, Gloucestershire was one of the first counties to meet the bulk of its quota (incorporating the vestiges of the old regiments) and was ready to issue them with arms on 15 May 1759. A train of waggons carrying arms and accoutrements for the regiment left the Tower of London on 22 May.

The regiment was commanded by Col Norborne Berkeley, who became Lord Lieutenant of Gloucestershire in 1762. The 1st or South Battalion was embodied for permanent duty at Gloucester on 27 July 1759 with eight companies under his command.

At that time the 2nd (North) Battalion had only gathered two companies but it was formally raised with seven companies at Cirencester on 22 August 1760, when its weapons were requested. It was embodied under the command of Lt-Col Viscount Tracy on 9 April 1761 and granted the subtitle of 'Fusiliers' the same year. A Bristol battalion may also have been formed in 1762. The North and South battalions regiments were camped together at Winchester during the summer of 1761. From November the North battalion was stationed at Bideford guarding French prisoners-of-war. The battalion returned to Winchester in June 1762, then in the autumn it marched to Gloucestershire.

The Seven Years War ended with the Treaty of Paris on 10 February 1763 and the two battalions of Gloucestershire militia were disembodied, but not before they became separate South and North regiments on 20 April.

=== War of American Independence ===
After the outbreak of the War of American Independence in 1775 a controversial Act of Parliament was passed to 'Enable His Majesty to call out and assemble the Militia in all cases of Rebellion in any part of the Dominion belonging to the Crown of Great Britain'. In the event the militia was called out in its traditional role when Britain was threatened with invasion by the Americans' allies, France and Spain. Both Gloucestershire regiments were embodied from 1778 to 1782.

From 1784 to 1792 the militia were assembled for their 28 days' annual training, but to save money only two-thirds of the men were actually called out.

=== French Wars ===
In view of the worsening international situation the militia was embodied for service in 1792, even though Revolutionary France did not declare war on Britain until 1 February 1793. Both Gloucestershire regiments were at Weymouth, Dorset, in 1795 when King George III stayed there and granted them the title 'Royal', but the North regiment lost its 'Fusiliers' distinction the following year.

The French Revolutionary Wars saw a new phase for the English militia: they were embodied for a whole generation, and became regiments of full-time professional soldiers (though restricted to service in the British Isles), which the regular army increasingly saw as a prime source of recruits. They served in coast defences, manning garrisons, guarding prisoners of war, and for internal security, while their traditional local defence duties were taken over by the Volunteers. Agricultural workers in the ranks could be loaned out to farmers during the harvest. Service in the militia could be hard: the men found that a daily food allowance of five pence did not go far when the price of provisions rose, and some units were involved in food riots. While stationed at Portsmouth in 1795 the men of the Gloucestershire Militia forced the local butchers to lower their prices.

In a fresh attempt to have as many men as possible under arms for home defence in order to release regulars, the Government created the Supplementary Militia, a compulsory levy of men to be trained in their spare time, and to be incorporated in the Militia in emergency. In 1796 Gloucestershire had to find an additional 1757 militiamen for the Supplementary Militia, though unlike some counties these were apparently incorporated into the two existing regiments. The Supplementary Militia were stood down in 1799, but the county had to find 1163 more in 1802.

When the Irish Rebellion broke out in 1798 the Royal North Gloucesters (RNG) volunteered for service there, but arrived too late for action, the French army surrendering soon after the regiment arrived. It returned to England in 1799. A peace treaty having been agreed (the Treaty of Amiens), the militia were disembodied in 1802. The peacetime quota for Gloucestershire was set at 1163 militiamen. However the Peace of Amiens quickly broke down, and they were embodied once more in 1803. Both regiments marched to Portsmouth, where they did duty alternately for a few months. They resumed the routine of summer camps and winter quarters around the country, undergoing training, suppressing smuggling and guarding prisoners, all the while being depleted by men volunteering for the regulars: the RNG supplied a large number of recruits to the 9th Foot. The two Gloucestershire regiments came together again in August 1808, when a large militia camp was held near Brighton, the excuse being the birthday of the Prince of Wales, but the opportunity being taken to carry out collective manoeuvres. The RNG served in Ireland again in 1813–14.

=== Gloucestershire Local Militia ===
While the established militia were the mainstay of national defence during the Revolutionary and Napoleonic Wars, they were supplemented from 1808 by the Local Militia, which were part-time and only to be used within their own districts. These were raised to counter the declining numbers of Volunteers, and if their ranks could not be filled voluntarily the Militia Ballot was employed. Three regiments were formed in Gloucestershire, each commanded by an officer from the RNG; a further regiment was added in 1813:

- Royal West Gloucestershire Local Militia – formed at Bristol under Lt-Col Commandant Thomas, 4th Lord Ducie, commissioned 4 April 1809
- 1st East Gloucestershire Local Militia – formed at Gloucester under Lt-Col Comdt Sir Berkeley Guise, 2nd Baronet, of Highnam, commissioned 14 April 1809
- 2nd East Gloucestershire Local Militia – formed at Cirencester under Lt-Col Comdt Sir Henry Lippincott, 2nd Baronet, commissioned 9 May 1809; became North Gloucestershire (see below) in 1813
- Royal Cotswold Local Militia – formed at Cirencester under Lt-Col Comdt Henry, Lord Apsley, commissioned 24 January 1813
- North Gloucestershire Local Militia – based at Tewkesbury from 1813

After Napoleon's exile to Elba the Gloucestershire Militia was disembodied in 1814. They were not called out again during the short Waterloo campaign. The Local Militia was disbanded in 1816. Although officers continued to be commissioned into the 'Regular' militia and ballots were still held to maintain the numbers of militiamen, they were rarely assembled for training after Waterloo – the RNG were only trained in 1820, 1821, 1825 and 1831. The permanent staffs of the regiments were progressively reduced. (Note: It is possible that the Gloucestershires or at least their permanent staff were called out in 1827 or 1840 to deal with riots by weavers and Chartists at Dursley.)

== 1852 Reforms ==
The long-standing national Militia of the United Kingdom was revived by the Militia Act 1852, enacted during a period of international tension. As before, units were raised and administered on a county basis, and filled by voluntary enlistment (although conscription by means of the Militia Ballot might be used if the counties failed to meet their quotas). Training was for 56 days on enlistment, then for 21–28 days per year, during which the men received full army pay. Under the Act (amended in 1854), Militia units could be embodied by Royal Proclamation for full-time service in three circumstances:

1. 'Whenever a state of war exists between Her Majesty and any foreign power'.
2. 'In all cases of invasion or upon imminent danger thereof'.
3. 'In all cases of rebellion or insurrection'.

Under the new organisation, militia regiments had an honorary colonel, but were commanded by a lieutenant-colonel.

The quota for Gloucestershire was set at 1993 men and the Lord Lieutenant was instructed to recruit the two moribund regiments up to this strength over the next two years.

=== Crimean War and after ===
War having broken out with Russia in 1854 and an expeditionary force sent to the Crimea, the Militia were called out in 1854. In this year the RSGM was redesignated as light infantry, as the Royal South Gloucestershire Light Infantry (RSGLI), or more pompously as the Royal South Battalion of the Gloucestershire Light Infantry Militia Both regiments were disembodied in 1856 but the RNG was embodied a year later during the Indian Mutiny, serving for a few months in Ireland.

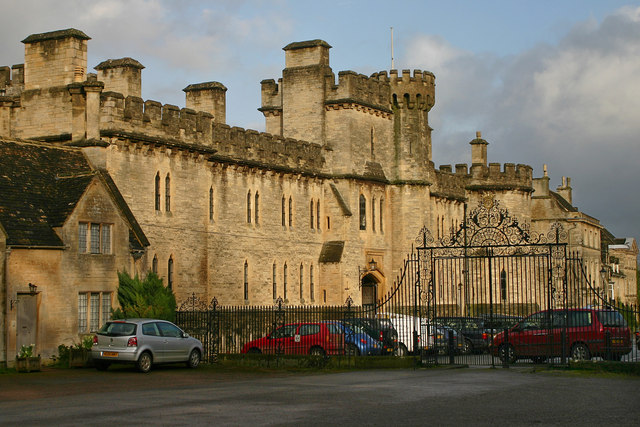
Cecily Hill Barracks today, formerly the headquarters of the Royal North Gloucestershire Militia.

Under the 'Localisation of the Forces' scheme introduced by the Cardwell Reforms of 1872, militia regiments were brigaded with their local Regular and Volunteer battalions – for the Gloucestershire Militia this was with the 28th (North Gloucestershire) and 61st (South Gloucestershire) Regiments of Foot in Sub-District No 37 (County of Gloucester) in Western District. The Militia were now under the War Office rather than their county lords lieutenant.

Although often referred to as brigades, the sub-districts were purely administrative organisations, but as a continuation of the Cardwell Reforms a mobilisation scheme began to appear in the Army List from December 1875. This assigned Regular and Militia units to places in an order of battle of corps, divisions and brigades for the 'Active Army', even though these formations were entirely theoretical, with no staff or services assigned. Both Gloucestershire militia regiments were assigned to 1st Brigade of 3rd Division, V Corps. The division would have mustered at Gloucester in time of war, and did actually undertake collective training at Minchinhampton Common in 1876 during the international crisis that led to the Russo-Turkish War; the Militia Reserve were also called out during this crisis. By 1880 the South Regiment had moved its headquarters to the brigade depot at Horfield Barracks, Bristol, but the North Regiment resisted the move and remained at Cirencester, where Cecily Hill Barracks had been built for it in 1854–6.

== Gloucestershire Regiment ==
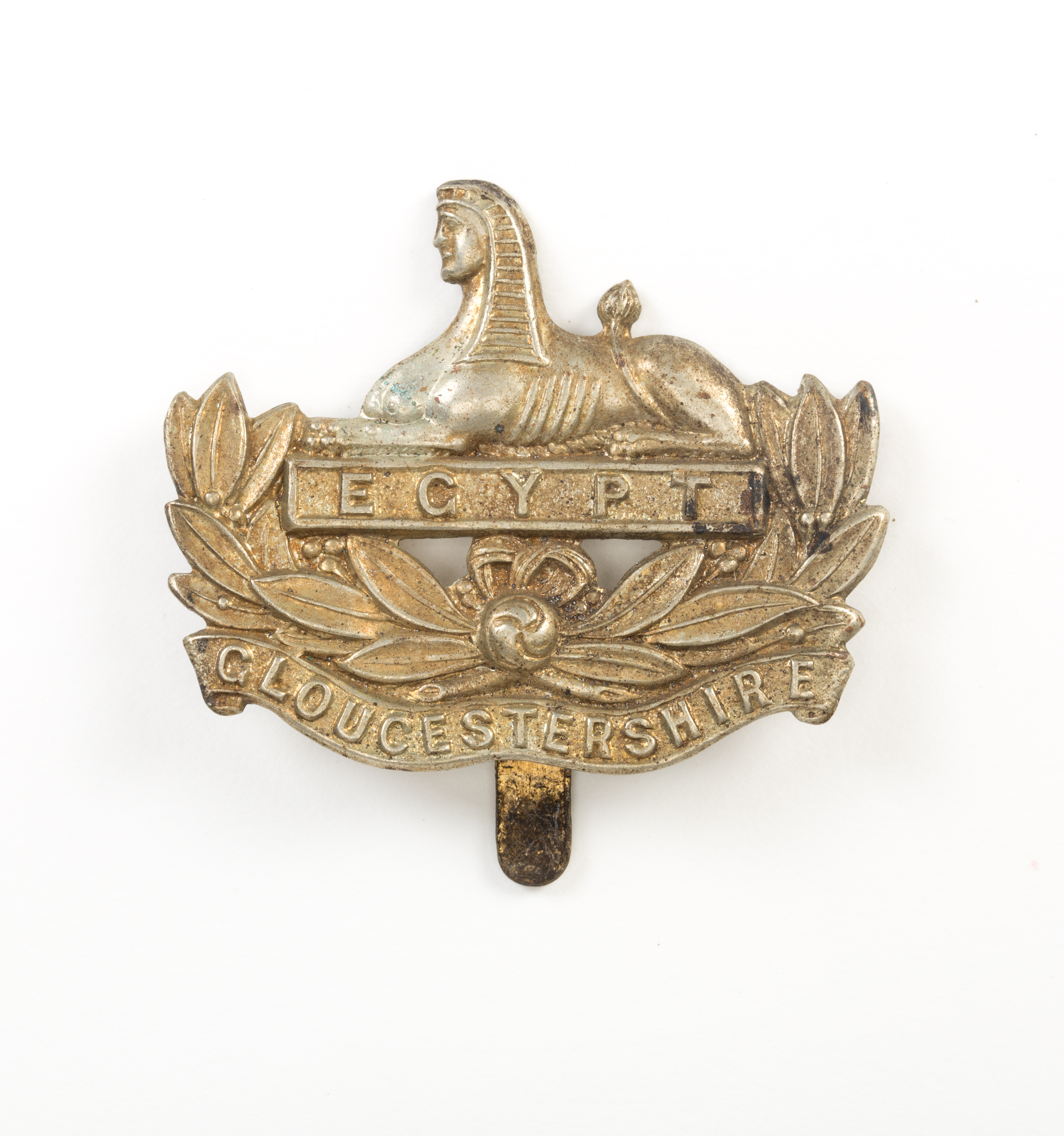
Cap badge of the Gloucestershire Regiment.

The Childers Reforms of 1881 took Cardwell's reforms further, with the linked Regular regiments becoming two-battalion regiments and their linked militia formally joining as sequentially numbered battalions. The 28th and 61st Foot became the Gloucestershire Regiment ('The Glosters') and the South and North militia regiments became its 3rd and 4th Battalions on 1 July 1881. All recruits, whether Regular or Militia, underwent training at the regimental depot before being posted to their battalions. Militia battalions now had a large cadre of permanent staff (about 30). Around a third of the recruits and many young officers went on to join the Regular Army. The Militia Reserve, formed in 1868, consisted of present and former militiamen who undertook to serve overseas in case of war.

=== Second Boer War ===
When the Second Boer War drew away most of the Regular Army, the Militia were called out for home defence and to garrison certain overseas stations. The 4th Gloucesters was embodied on 11 January 1900, followed by the 3rd Gloucesters on 15 May. The 4th Battalion was sent to guard Boer prisoners of war on Saint Helena, for which it was awarded the unique Battle Honour St Helena 1900–01. (Note: The only other unit to receive a St Helena battle honour was the 3rd Bn Wiltshire Regiment (Royal Wiltshire Militia), which relieved the 4th Gloucesters and was granted St Helena 1901–02.) The 3rd Battalion remained in the UK, though it did supply 124 volunteers to the 4th Bn for service in St Helena. The 3rd Bn was disembodied on 13 July 1901 and the 4th on 27 July.

== Special Reserve ==
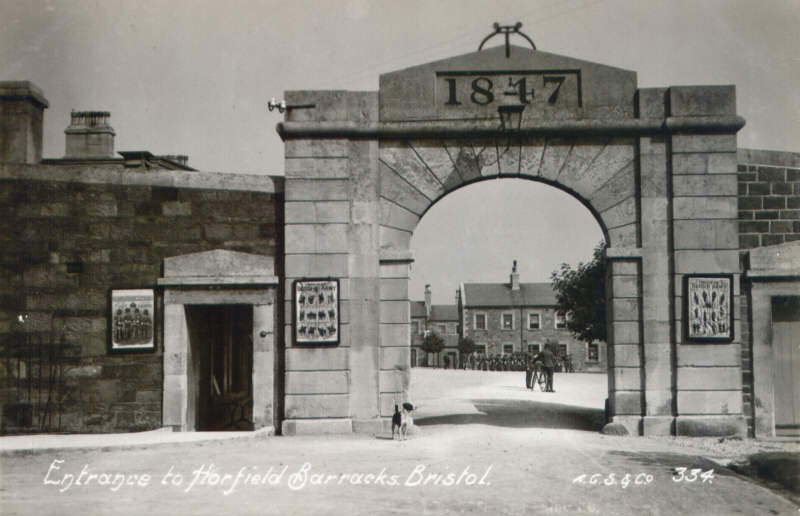
Horfield Barracks, Gloucester, regimental depot of the Glosters.

After the Boer War, there were moves to reform the Auxiliary Forces (Militia, Yeomanry and Volunteers) to take their place in the six Army Corps proposed by the Secretary of State for War, St John Brodrick. However, little of Brodrick's scheme was carried out. Collective training in brigades was carried out on Salisbury Plain in 1906 and 1907, with the 3rd and 4th Bns of the Glosters brigaded with the 4th Bn Oxfordshire Light Infantry and 3rd Bn Berkshires. Under the more sweeping Haldane Reforms in 1908, the Militia was replaced by the Special Reserve, a semi-professional force whose role was to provide reinforcement drafts for Regular units serving overseas in wartime (similar to the former Militia Reserve). The former RSGLI became the 3rd (Reserve) Battalion, Gloucestershire Regiment (Note: The Army List continued to show the battalion as the 3rd (Royal South Gloucester Militia).) on 7 June 1908, while the 4th Bn was disbanded on 31 July.

=== World War I ===
The 3rd (Reserve) Battalion was mobilised on the outbreak of war on 4 August 1914 and served in the UK throughout World War I, initially guarding Woolwich Arsenal and the huge dumps of explosives distributed nearby, later at Gravesend and then Sittingbourne in the Thames & Medway Garrison. All the while the battalion fulfilled its other purpose by training and forming drafts of reservists, recruits and returning wounded for the Regular battalions of the Gloucesters fighting on the Western Front. The SR also formed reserve battalions for the 'Kitchener's Army' units being formed: 3rd (Reserve) Bn Gloucesters formed 11th (Reserve) Bn. Thousands of men would have passed through the ranks of these battalions during the war. The 3rd Battalion was disembodied on 9 August 1919 when the remaining personnel were drafted to the 1st Bn.

=== Postwar ===
The SR resumed its old title of Militia in 1921 and then became the Supplementary Reserve in 1924, but like most militia battalions the 3rd Gloucestershires remained in abeyance after World War I. By the time of his death in 1938, Col William Burges (as honorary colonel) was the only remaining officer listed for the battalion. The Militia was formally disbanded in April 1953.

== Heritage and ceremonial ==
=== Precedence ===
In September 1759 it was ordered that militia regiments on service together were to take their relative precedence from the date of their arrival in camp. In 1760 this was altered to a system of drawing lots where regiments did duty together. During the War of American Independence the counties were given an order of precedence determined by ballot each year, beginning in 1778. In the French Revolutionary War the order balloted for in 1793 (Gloucestershire was 8th) remained in force until 1802, and another drawing took place at the start of the Napoleonic War (Gloucestershire was 7th), which remained in force until 1833. In that year the King drew the ballots for individual regiments and the resulting list remained in force with minor amendments until the end of the militia; the regiments raised before the peace of February 1763 took the first 37 places, the South Gloucesters becoming No 23, but the North Gloucesters (independent from April 1763) became No 69.

=== Uniforms and insignia ===
The Cirencester contingent of Gloucestershire levies who served in the North of England in 1570 were supplied with blue caps with a yellow band, a blue coat with yellow facings, and yellow stockings. The names of the 'White', 'Green', 'Blue' and 'Red' militia regiments of 1697 probably relate to their Regimental colours rather than their uniforms.

When the Gloucestershire Militia regiment was raised in 1761, both battalions wore red coats with blue facings. Officers wore gold lace, changed to silver in 1805 in line with normal militia practice. Drummers often wore 'reversed colours' (ie coats of the regimental facing colour, faced red), but the two Gloucester Militia regiments appear to have clothed their drummers in white coats faced red. By 1820 the drummers wore red faced with blue, appropriate for 'Royal' regiments, which did not reverse their colours.

The Gloucestershire Local Militia units wore uniforms that approximated to the 'Regular' militia: red with blue facings. Each had its own pattern buttons and pouch belt plates.

The two Gloucestershire militia regiments changed their facings to white when they became battalions of the Glosters in 1881, and the uniform thereafter was the same as the Regulars.

== See also ==
- Trained bands
- Militia (English)
- Militia (Great Britain)
- Militia (United Kingdom)
- Special Reserve
- Royal South Gloucestershire Light Infantry Militia
- Royal North Gloucestershire Militia
- Gloucestershire Regiment
