= Elizabeth Brydges =

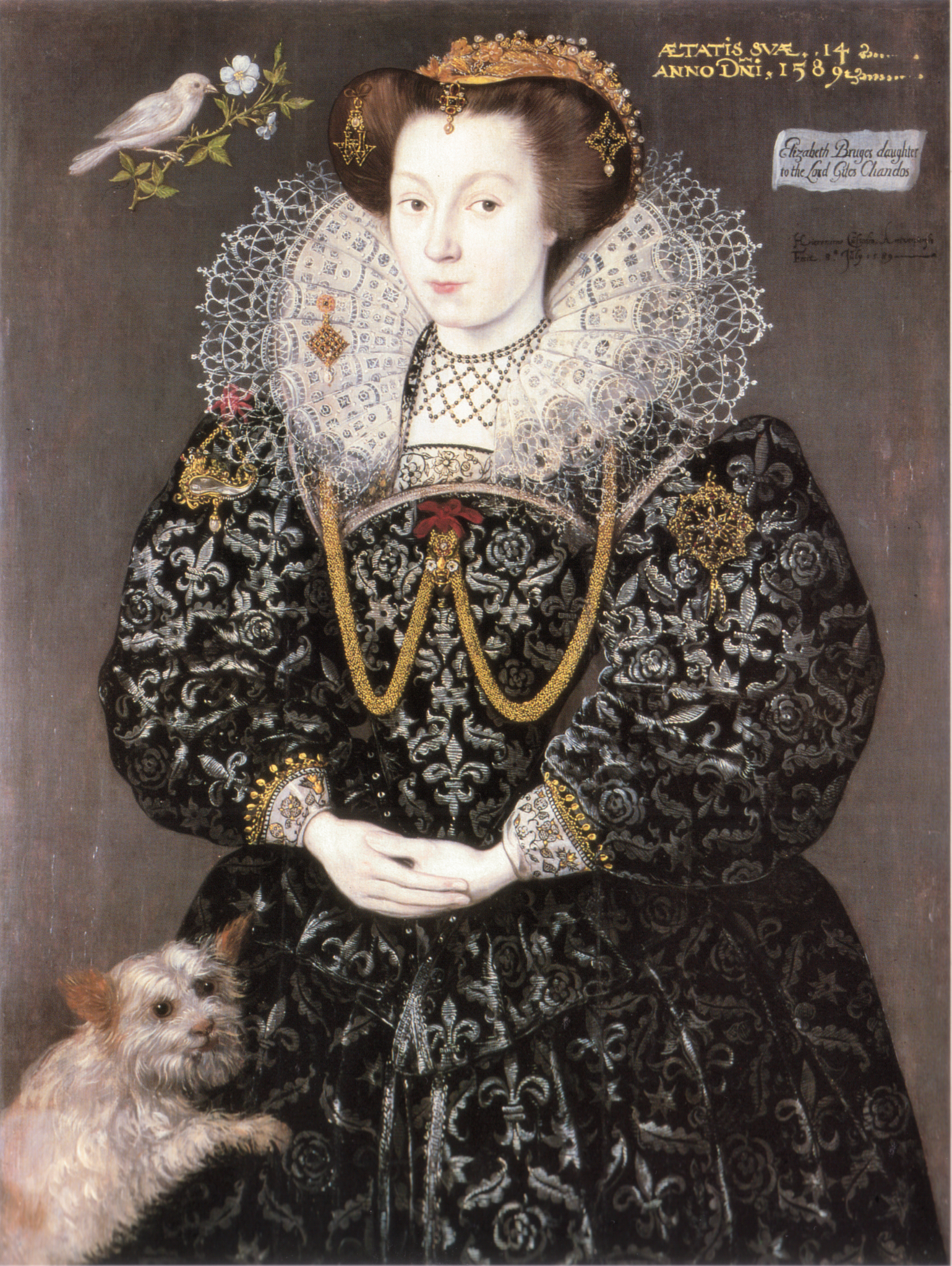
Elizabeth Brydges, aged 14, daughter of the 3rd Baron Chandos and maid of honour to Elizabeth I, 1589.

Elizabeth Brydges (c. 1575–1617) was a courtier and aristocrat, Maid of Honour to Elizabeth I, and victim of bigamy. She was a daughter of Giles Brydges, 3rd Baron Chandos, and Frances Clinton, who lived at Sudeley Castle.

== Life at Court ==
An entertainment for Queen Elizabeth at Sudeley in 1592 presented Elizabeth Brydges as Daphne, articulate, loyal, and chaste. In the pageant "Daphne" escaped from the laurel tree and ran to the queen. Soon after she joined the royal household as a Maiden of Honour.

In December 1593 it was said the "young Earl of Bedford was paying his addresses to Mrs Bridges, the lord Chandos' heir." At court in the 1590s, she obtained money from Charles Lister of New Windsor (d. 1613) and promised to marry him, and he complained in 1598 that he had loaned her more than £3000 and bankrupted himself. Brydges invested £150 of Lister's money in the Earl of Essex's assault on Cadiz. Around this time Brydges may have had some kind of affair with Essex, possibly to be identified as the woman noted by Rowland Whyte as "his fairest B."

One day in 1597 the "fair Mistress Brydges" and "Mrs Russell" (Elizabeth Russell, daughter of Elizabeth Cooke, Lady Russell) took physic, perhaps pretending to be ill to avoid their work, and went together through the privy galleries of the palace to watch men "playing at balloon". Queen Elizabeth was very angry and used "words and blows" against Brydges, and both women were suspended from their duties for three days and had to lodge outside the palace. Rowland Whyte hinted that the queen's storms of anger had arisen from another cause, perhaps Essex's interest in Brydges.

In January 1600, as a New Year's Day gift, Brydges gave Queen Elizabeth a doublet of network lawn, cut and tufted up with white knit-work, flourished with silver. During the entertainment at Harefield in August 1602, she was assigned a dozen points (clothing toggles) in the lottery with these verses; "You are in every point a lover true, And therefore fortune gives the points to you."

Elizabeth Brydges bought some of her clothes, and possibly her New Year's Day gifts, from an embroiderer James Sympson. Later, he claimed his bills from 1593, 1596, and 1597 remained unpaid. Sympson charged her £1 for stiffening (starching) and smoothing two skirts of a petticoat, £2 for altering a gown of white silver chamlet, £10 for supplying a new gown of dove colour satin, cut and razed with tinsel, £1 for cobweb lace upon a pair of sleeves of needlework, and 13 shillings four pence for a pair of sleeves of cloth of silver wrought about with strawberry leaves. A "suffkyn" or snoskyn, a kind of muff, of cloth of gold of dove colour cost £5, and could have been a suitable New Year's Day gift.

She was a co-heir of her father Baron Chandos, who died in 1594 with no sons. In June 1602 her cousin, Grey Brydges, who became Baron Chandos, disputed her claims on the family estate, and he attacked and injured her representative Ambrose Willoughby during a legal meeting. Grey's father, William Brydges, 4th Baron Chandos died in November 1602, and the estate was settled and a plan for Elizabeth and Grey to marry was abandoned.

After the death of Queen Elizabeth, Brydges, Lady Finch, and other women went to see King James at Theobalds where, according to Anne Clifford as a sign of the changing times, they were "all lousy" by waiting in Sir Thomas Erskine's chamber. In June 1603 "Mistress Bridges" went to meet the new queen, Anne of Denmark, riding from London with the Countess of Warwick and Anne Vavasour, the Countess of Cumberland and Anne Clifford joined them at Dingley Hall.

== Married life ==
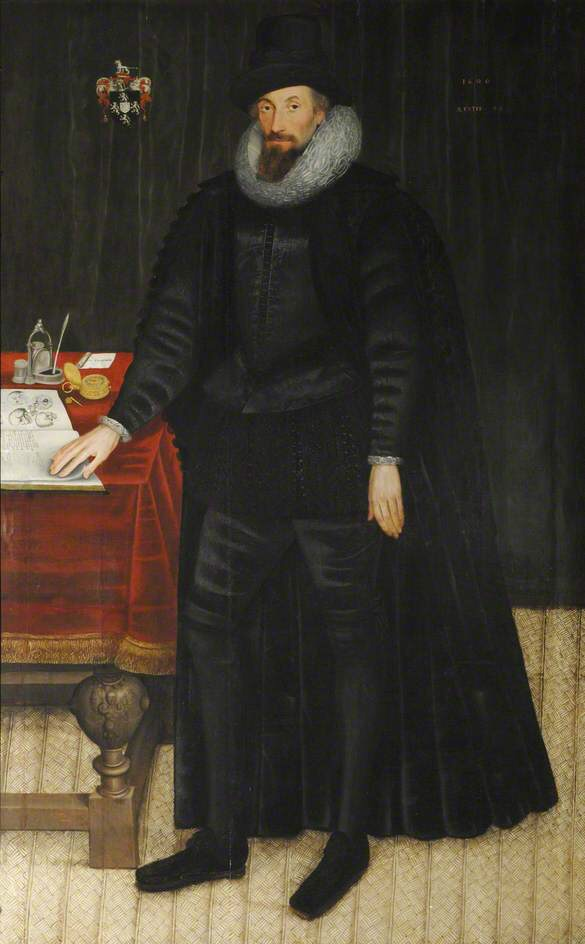
Brydges was suspected of having an affair with Sir William Paddy

Later in 1603 she married Sir John Kennedy, a Scottish member of the household of King James recently naturalised by Parliament as an Englishman. Marriages between Scottish and English courtiers and aristocrats were intended by the King to promote Anglo-Scottish unity. Kennedy however was already married and determined to get through Brydges's money. Her dowry was said to have been £16,500. She pursued a legal claim for her share of the Chandos estate and Sudeley in 1603.

In 1605, Kennedy refused to pay a disputed bill for embroidered garments bought by Elizabeth in the 1590s, claiming they had already paid. The items are detailed in a Chancery bill. Kennedy's exact identity may be obscure. A John Kennedy had been a cup bearer in the Scottish household of Anne of Denmark, and John Kennedy, "apparent of Baltersan" was described as a royal servant in 1601. Anne of Denmark was discouraged from appointing a "Mr Kennedy" as her chamberlain in 1603.

The king is said to have written a letter of recommendation in Kennedy's favour to Brydges' mother Lady Frances, and certainly wrote in 1604 to Grey Brydges, who disapproved of the marriage, instructing him to be kind to them. However, at some point, Kennedy's previous marriage was discovered, and the couple separated. Kennedy was still in favour at court and took part in the masque The Hue and Cry After Cupid on 9 February 1608, so presumably his troubles started in earnest after that date.

Elizabeth made Kennedy move out of their house at Barn Elms. On 3 September 1609 she was asleep at midnight and a physician William Paddy was also in the house, when Kennedy attacked with a band of "furious Scots". According to Dudley Carleton the raiders were equipped with hot irons ready to mutilate Paddy, suspected to be having an affair with Brydges. They escaped via the back door in a state of undress and found safety in the house of her cousin Elizabeth, wife of Arthur Gorges at Chelsea. Gorges wrote that she arrived "lyker to dye than lyve". Brydges had been unwell, a list of Kennedy's debts includes sums for Brydges's lodging, her servant, and expenses for her physic and pregnancy. Her child, Francis Kennedy, had died in November 1608.

Accounts vary about the status of the marriage, some stating that Sir John's first wife was dead. In September 1609, Brydges complained to Archbishop of Canterbury about Kennedy's cruelty, and adulteries, and that he had a wife living when he married her. The circumstances were obscure at the time, and in November 1609 the King and the Chancellor of Scotland, Alexander Seton, 1st Earl of Dunfermline, discussed how Kennedy should make a solemn oath about his first wedding, which might then reveal if it were possible to dissolve the present marriage as was wished, or not. On 26 September 1609 Viscount Lisle wrote, "My Lady Kennedy's cause has been heard before the council, but she disclaims that name and writes herself Elizabeth Bridges, pretending a former marriage in Sir John Kennedy". An undated petition to the king for her divorce mentions an unfavourable court decision in Scotland.

John Chamberlain heard she was divorced in October 1611, and that she might marry the poet Henry Reynolds who was secretary to the Lord Chamberlain and a friend of Michael Drayton. Reynolds was soon looking elsewhere for a bride.

She died on 7 October 1617 at Westminster. She was in fits or convulsions which led some to suspect she had poisoned herself.

An old version of her story lays emphasis on Brydges as a spendthrift and Kennedy unable to satisfy her wants, seeking to extricate himself from the marriage by any means, with the help of the lawyer Francis Bacon. However, Kennedy's known involvement with Bacon was in the years after the marriage break-up. In 1621 Bacon was accused of corruption in the case of Kennedy against the jeweller and financier Peter Vanlore, for accepting his gift of a cabinet worth £800, which he later offered to Kennedy's creditor Timothy Pinkney.

In 1615 Kennedy and Sir George Belgrave were put in the Gatehouse Prison for falsely accusing a gentleman of slandering the Duke of Lennox and the Scots at court. Kennedy died in 1622, leaving a will appointing his "only and naturall daughter Dorothy Kennedy" and the Duke of Lennox as his executors. When he died Dorothy was still a minor, so Barbara Ruthven was appointed administrator. In August 1623 a "cadet" of Sir John Kennedy was discussed as owner of the Barn Elms property.

== Portraits ==
Hieronimo Custodis painted her portrait dated 1589 with her age recorded as 14. A portrait of Sir John Kennedy dated 1614 formerly attributed to Cornelius Johnson, also at Woburn Abbey, shows a woman's portrait hidden behind a curtain hanging in the background. In another portrait at Woburn of Elizabeth Brydges, attributed in the nineteenth-century to Daniel Mytens or more plausibly Marcus Gheeraerts the Younger, her stomacher is ornamented with six-pointed stars edged with pearls. There is also a miniature by Isaac Oliver.
