= Dorothy Bray, Baroness Chandos =

English noblewoman and courtier (c.1524–1605)

Dorothy Bray (Braye)
- Baroness Chandos
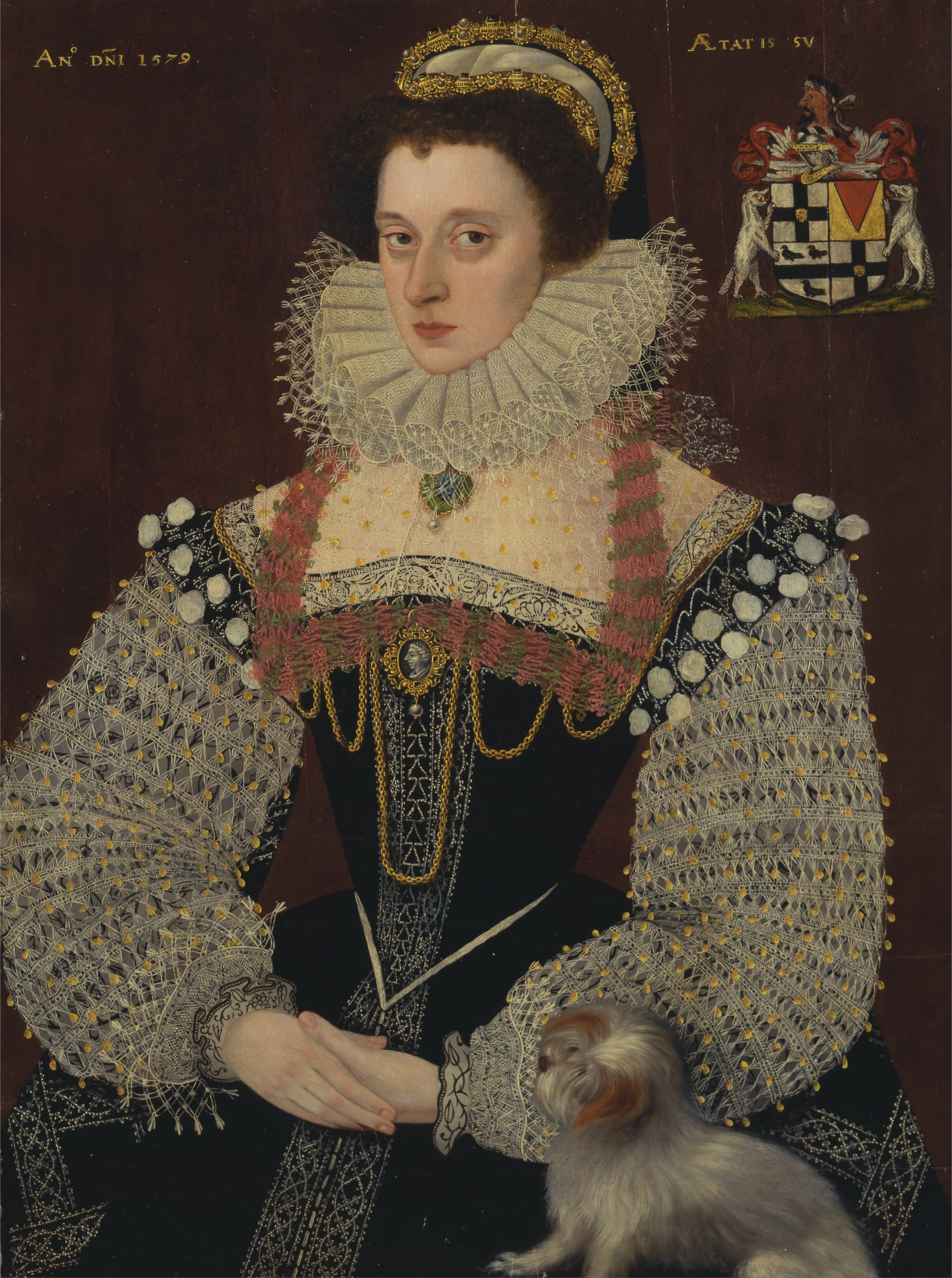
- Portrait by John Bettes the Younger, alleged to be that of Dorothy Braye, Baroness Chandos, c. 1578
- Born: c. 1524; Eaton Bray, Bedfordshire, England
- Died: October 31, 1605 (aged 80–81); Minety, Wiltshire, England
- Buried: Rotherfield Greys Church
- Spouses: Edmund Brydges, 2nd Baron Chandos; William Knollys MP
- Issue: Mary Brydges; Katherine Brydges; Eleanor Brydges; Giles Brydges, 3rd Baron Chandos; William Brydges, 4th Baron Chandos
- Father: Sir Edmund Braye, 1st Baron Braye
- Mother: Jane Halliwell
- Occupation: Maid of Honour

Dorothy Bray (or Braye), Baroness Chandos (c. 1524 – 31 October 1605) was an English noblewoman, who served as a Maid of Honour to three queens consort of King Henry VIII of England; Anne of Cleves, Catherine Howard, and Catherine Parr. From 1541 to 1543, she had an affair with the latter's married brother, William Parr, 1st Marquess of Northampton.

In 1546, Dorothy married her first husband Edmund Brydges, 2nd Baron Chandos.

== Family ==
Dorothy was born in about 1524 at Eaton Bray, Bedfordshire, the youngest daughter and child of Sir Edmund Braye, 1st Baron Braye, and Jane Halliwell. She had a brother, John Braye, 2nd Baron Braye, of whom she was one of his co-heirs, along with her five older sisters. The eldest, Anne, Baroness Cobham was 23 years her senior.

== At the English royal court ==
Dorothy first came to court in 1540, where she served as a Maid of Honour to Anne of Cleves, fourth wife of Henry VIII. When that marriage was annulled, Dorothy went on to serve in the same capacity, Anne's successor, Catherine Howard, whom the King had married in July 1540.

In 1541, Dorothy embarked on a love affair with William Parr, Baron Parr of Kendal, who would later hold the title of 1st Marquess of Northampton, after Baron Parr's wife, Anne Bourchier, 7th Baroness Bourchier had created a scandal when she ran off with her lover, John Lyngfield, and shortly afterwards bore him an illegitimate child.

Dorothy's affair with Parr lasted until 1543, when he began to court her niece, Elizabeth Brooke, who had also been one of Catherine Howard's Maids of Honour up until the Queen's execution for High treason. It was during that time (1543) that King Henry himself was courting Parr's sister, Catherine, whom he married in July. Dorothy entered the new Queen's household as one of her Maids of Honour.

== Marriages and issue ==
Sometime in about 1546, she married her first husband, Edmund Brydges, son of John Brydges, 1st Baron Chandos. Together they had five children:

- Mary Brydges
- Katherine Brydges (died before December 1597), married William Sandys, 3rd Baron Sandys of the Vyne, by whom she had one daughter, Elizabeth.
- Eleanor Brydges, married George Giffard
- Giles Brydges, 3rd Baron Chandos (1547- 21 February 1594), married Frances Clinton de Fiennes (1553–1623), daughter of Edward Clinton, 1st Earl of Lincoln and Ursula Stourton, by whom he had two daughters.
- William Brydges, 4th Baron Chandos (c.1552- 18 November 1602), married Mary Hopton, by whom he had one son, Grey Brydges, 5th Baron Chandos, and a daughter, Frances Brydges.

On 12 April 1557, when her husband succeeded to his title, Dorothy was styled Baroness Chandos; in later years, she became known as "Old Lady Chandos".

They made their home at Sudeley Castle in Gloucestershire.

On 11 March 1573, Edmund died and he was succeeded by their eldest son, Giles. The following year, Queen Elizabeth visited Dorothy at Sudeley Castle.

Her second husband, William Knollys MP, was considerably younger than Dorothy (17–20 years). The date of their marriage was not recorded.

A portrait of a woman painted by John Bettes the Younger in about 1578, is allegedly that of Dorothy.

== Death ==
Dorothy died in Minty, Gloucestershire, on 31 October 1605 at the age of 81. She was buried in Rotherfield Greys Church, Oxfordshire, where her effigy can be seen. Her grandson Grey Brydges, 5th Baron Chandos inherited her estate.

Less than two months after Dorothy's death, William Knollys married his second wife, Lady Elizabeth Howard. It was uncertain as to whether Elizabeth's two sons were fathered by William, and as a result they were not permitted to take their seats as Earls of Banbury in the House of Lords.
