= Frances Brydges, Lady Chandos =

English aristocrat

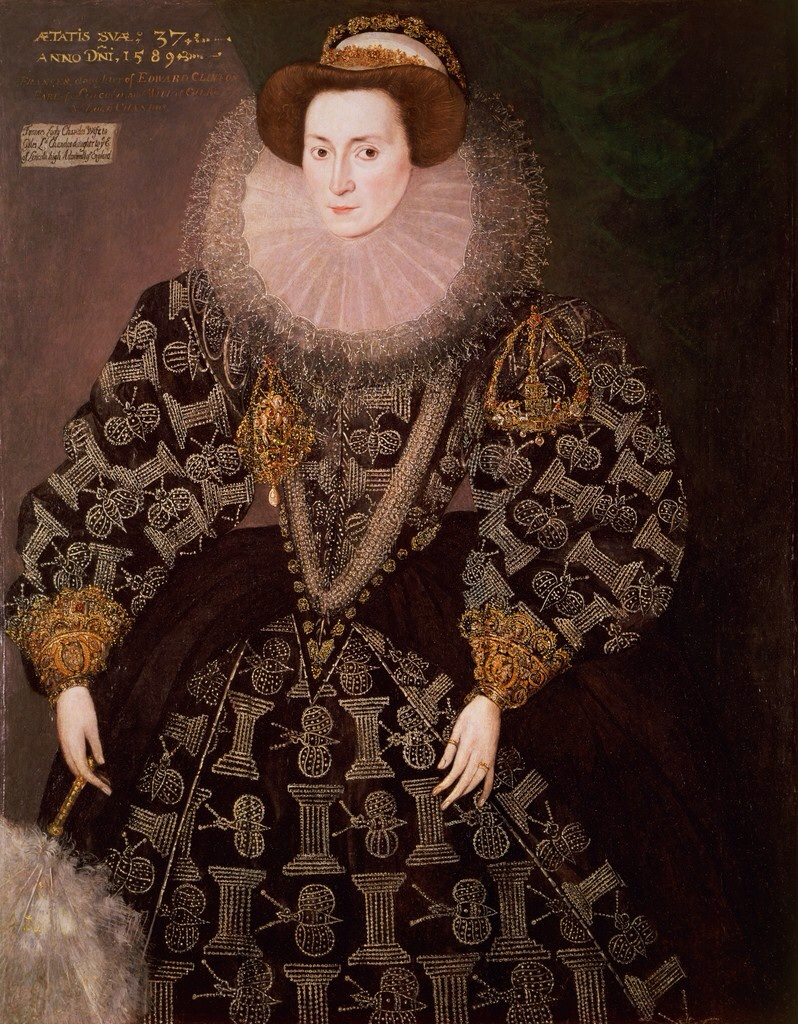
Frances Brydges, née Clinton, Lady Chandos, by Hieronimo Custodis, 1589, Woburn

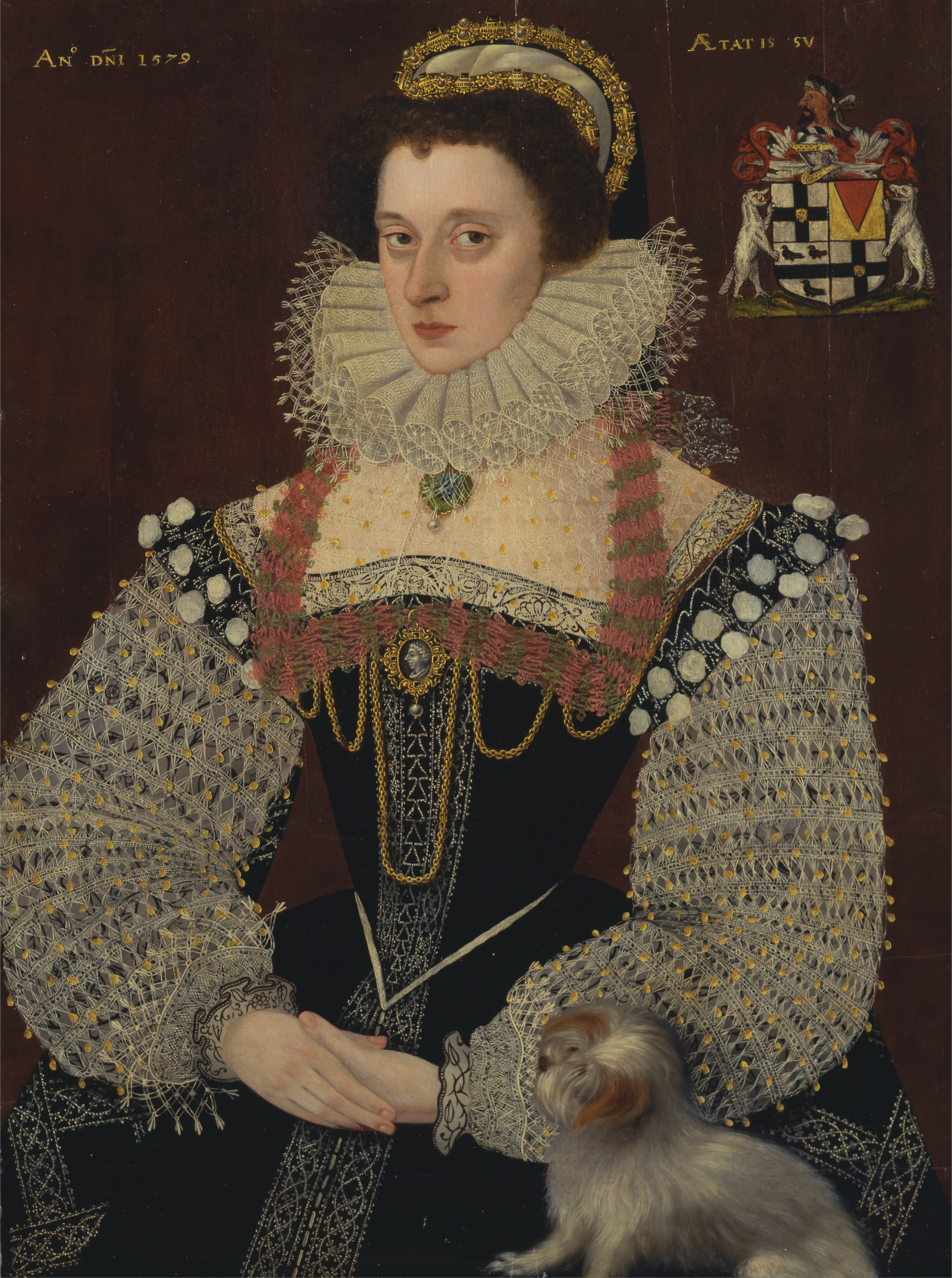
Frances Brydges, 1579, George Gower, Yale Center for British Art

Frances Brydges, Lady Chandos née Clinton (1552–1623) was an English aristocrat.

She was a daughter of Edward Clinton, 1st Earl of Lincoln and his second wife Ursula Stourton, a daughter of William Stourton, 7th Baron Stourton. She was born at Scrivelsby, Lincolnshire.

She married Giles Brydges, 3rd Baron Chandos, and lived at Sudeley Castle. They entertained Elizabeth I at Sudeley in September 1592 with an entertainment based on the theme of Apollo and Daphne. A part of the entertainment was printed in, Speeches delivered to her Majestie this last progresse, at the Right Honorable the Lady Russels, at Bissam, the Right Honorable the Lord Chandos at Sudley, at the Right Honorourable the Lord Norris at Ricote (Oxford: Joseph Barnes, 1592).

She died on 12 September 1623 at Woburn Abbey, the home of her daughter, and was buried in the Bedford Chapel at St Michael's, Chenies.

Her portrait dated 1589 by Hieronimo Custodis is kept at Woburn. Her clothes are embroidered with pearls in patterns of moths and pillars. On her sleeve she wears a large pendant showing a scene of Diana and Actaeon and another pinned to her bodice depicts Perseus and Andromeda.

An earlier portrait of Frances, Lady Chandos, by George Gower is dated 1579, the sitter was formerly thought to be Frances' mother-in-law Dorothy Bray, Baroness Chandos.

Her children included:

- Elizabeth Brydges (died 1617), Maid of Honour to Elizabeth I, she married Sir John Kennedy, but it was discovered he had a wife already in Scotland.
- Catherine Brydges (died 1657), married Francis Russell, 4th Earl of Bedford
- John Brydges, died young
- Charles Brydges, died young
