= John Bridgeman (judge) =

English barrister and Chief Justice of Chester (1568/9–1638)

Sir John Bridgeman, SL (1568/69 – 5 February 1638) was a barrister of the Inner Temple, serjeant-at-law and local magnate in the West of England during the early 17th century.

== Early career ==
Bridgeman came from a minor gentry family settled at Littledean, Gloucestershire. He matriculated from Magdalen College, Oxford in June 1582, and after some years at Clifford's Inn, was admitted to the Inner Temple in June 1591. Sometime during this period, he married Frances Daunt. When her brother Giles died in 1596, he became embroiled in a dispute with her uncle Thomas Daunt over the manor of Owlpen. He lost the case when he was accused of forging deeds before Sir Edward Coke, the Attorney General. They had at least two children:

- George Bridgeman
- Anne Bridgeman, married John Winford

Bridgeman was called to the bar in 1600. Most of his work was in the Court of Common Pleas, a report of whose proceedings between 1613 and 1621 he compiled. In 1613, he purchased the manor of Nympsfield, Gloucestershire, with Luke Garnon. He was counsel for the city of Gloucester in 1614, and in 1615 he was made a bencher of the Inner Temple. In 1622, he served as counsel for Exeter in a successful attempt to block the inclusion of Bishop Valentine Carey in the city's commission of the peace, and was engaged as counsel by Lord Zouche.

1623 saw a number of advancements for Bridgeman. He was appointed to the Council of the Marches on 30 June 1623, made a serjeant-at-law in October 1623, and knighted on 7 December 1623. With the assistance of Sir Thomas Coventry, a fellow student at the Inner Temple, he was appointed to the vacant office of Chief Justice of Chester in February 1626.

== Judicial activities in Wales ==
As Chief Justice of Chester, he retained, ex officio, his place on the Council in the Marches, and regularly served as deputy for the two presidents during his tenure (Northampton and Bridgewater). He regularly served as a justice of the peace in Wales and the Marches, and as recorder for Gloucester (1628), Shrewsbury, Ludlow, and Wenlock. Bridgeman seems to have been assiduous and devoted to his numerous duties.

In 1628, he and his son George jointly purchased Prinknash Park, near Gloucester, which then became the family home.

In 1637, Bridgeman was compelled to take severe measures to end pilgrimages to St Winefride's Well, Flintshire, considered a hotbed of recusancy by the government. He died in 1638 at Ludlow. He seems to have been a harsh and unpopular judge, as Ralph Gibbon composed the following pasquinade upon his death:

Here lies Sir John Bridgeman clad in his clay;
God said to the devil, Sirrah, take him away.

He is buried in Ludlow's St Laurence's Church, where the monument to him and his wife is attributed to court sculptor Francesco Fanelli.

== Notes ==
Political offices
Preceded by The Lord Chandos	Custos Rotulorum of Gloucestershire; 1621–1638	Succeeded by The Lord Coventry
Legal offices
Preceded by Sir Thomas Chamberlayne	Chief Justice of Chester; 1626–1638	Succeeded by Sir Thomas Milward
