= Custos Rotulorum of Gloucestershire =

This is a list of people who have served as Custos Rotulorum of Gloucestershire.

- Sir Edmund Tame bef. 1544–1544
- Sir Anthony Kingston 1544?–1556
- Sir Nicholas Arnold bef. 1558–1580
- Sir Thomas Throckmorton bef. 1584 – 1602 (deprived of office)
- Sir John Poyntz 1602 – aft. 1608
- Grey Brydges, 5th Baron Chandos bef. 1621–1621
- Sir John Bridgeman 1621–1638
- Thomas Coventry, 1st Baron Coventry 1638–1640
- vacant?
- Interregnum
- George Berkeley, 1st Earl of Berkeley 1660–1689
- Charles Berkeley, 2nd Earl of Berkeley 1689–1710

For later custodes rotulorum, see Lord Lieutenant of Gloucestershire.
