= William Brydges, 4th Baron Chandos =

English peer

William Brydges, 4th Baron Chandos (c. 1552 – 1602) was an English peer and politician.

He was the younger son and heir of Edmund Brydges, 2nd Baron Chandos and Dorothy, the youngest daughter and child of Sir Edmund Braye, 1st Baron Braye.

Until he succeeded his brother Giles to the bulk of the family estates in Gloucestershire, Wiltshire and Worcestershire, Brydges followed the comparatively obscure existence of a younger son. In Parliament he sat for Cricklade, the stewardship of which was in his family, and twice he represented Gloucestershire, where the influence of his brother was sufficient to secure the seat.

In 1588, he was captain of a company of the Gloucestershire Trained Bands in Queen Elizabeth I's army facing the invasion threat of the Spanish Armada.

He succeeded his elder brother as Baron Chandos, and served as Lord Lieutenant of Gloucestershire and Member of Parliament for Cricklade.

== Family ==
Chandos married Mary Hopton (d. 1624), daughter of Sir Owen Hopton of Cockfield, Yoxford, and Anne Echingham. Their children included;

- Grey Brydges, his heir.
- Beatrix Brydges (d. 1602), married Sir Henry Poole of Sapperton, MP for Cirencester.
- Frances Brydges, married firstly, Sir Thomas Smith of Parson's Green, Master of Requests, and secondly, Thomas Cecil, 1st Earl of Exeter.
- Joan or Eleanor Brydges (d. 1616) married Sir Ambrose or Sir Thomas Turville, cupbearer to Anne of Denmark.

Parliament of England
Preceded by Sir Nicholas Arnold	Member of Parliament for Cricklade; 1572	Succeeded by Rowland Leigh
Political offices
Preceded by The Lord Chandos	Lord Lieutenant of Gloucestershire; 1595–1602	Succeeded by The Lord Berkeley
Peerage of England
Preceded by Giles Brydges	Baron Chandos; 2nd creation 1594–1602	Succeeded by Grey Brydges
