= George Throckmorton =

16th-century English politician (1480 – 1552)

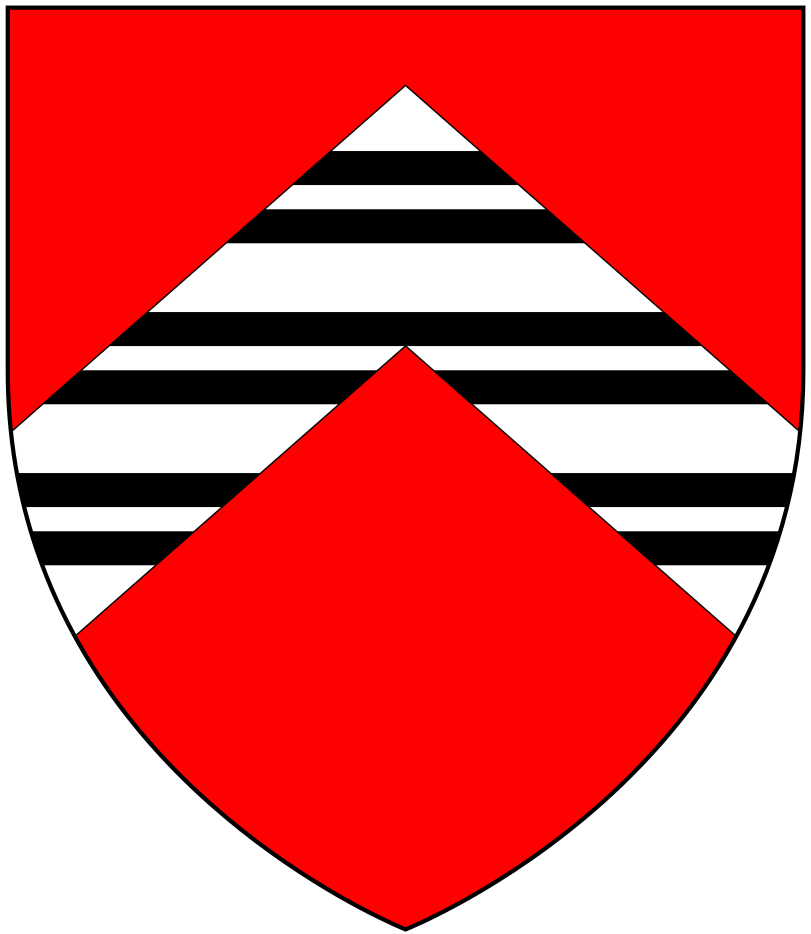
Arms of Throckmorton: Gules, on a chevron argent three bars gemelles sable

Sir George Throckmorton (c. 1480 – 6 August 1552) of Coughton Court in Warwickshire, England, was a Member of Parliament during the reign of King Henry VIII.

== Origins ==
Born before 1489 in Worcestershire, Throckmorton was the eldest son and heir of Robert Throckmorton of Coughton Court, a soldier, courtier, and Councillor to King Henry VII, by his wife Catherine Marrow, a daughter of William Marowe (or Marrow), Lord Mayor of London. The Throckmorton family (originally "de Throckmorton") took its surname from the manor of Throckmorton in the parish of Fladbury, Worcestershire, which from the 12th century they held under the overlordship of the Bishop of Worcester. They acquired the manor of Coughton by marriage in the early 15th century.

Throckmorton attended the Field of Cloth of Gold in 1520.

Throckmorton was an outspoken critic of King Henry VIII's separation from Catherine of Aragon and spoke against it before the House of Commons.

== Marriage and issue ==
Arms of Vaux: Chequy argent and gules, on a chevron azure three roses or

In 1512, Throckmorton married Katherine Vaux, the eldest daughter of Nicholas Vaux, 1st Baron Vaux of Harrowden by his first wife Elizabeth FitzHugh.

=== Sons ===
- Robert Throckmorton (c. 1513 - 12 February 1581) of Coughton Court, eldest son and heir, who married firstly, in about 1527, Muriel Berkeley (died 1542). He married secondly Elizabeth Hussey (c.1510-1554), widow of Walter Hungerford, 1st Baron Hungerford of Heytesbury, and daughter of John Hussey, 1st Baron Hussey of Sleaford.
- Kenelm Throckmorton (c. 1512 - 1585), 2nd son, who married and had issue.
- Clement Throckmorton (c. 1512 – 14 December 1573), of Haseley in Warwickshire, who married Katherine Neville, eldest daughter of Edward Neville of Addington Park in Kent.
- Sir Nicholas Throckmorton (1515–1571), father of Elizabeth "Bess'" Throckmorton, a lady-in-waiting to Queen Elizabeth I and married Sir Walter Raleigh the explorer.
- Thomas Throckmorton, (born c. 1522).
- Sir John Throckmorton (c. 1524 - 22 May 1580), father of the conspirator Francis Throckmorton.
- Anthony Throckmorton (born c. 1528).
- George Throckmorton, (c. 1533 – 1612).

=== Daughters ===
- Elizabeth Throckmorton, who married thrice, firstly to John Gifford, secondly to William Lygon and thirdly to George Peyto.
- Mary Throckmorton (born c.1530), who married Sir John Huband;
- Katherine Throckmorton, whose husband's first name was Thomas;
- Anne Throckmorton (c. 1532-21 Dec 1553), who married John Digby;
- Margaret Throckmorton (b. circa 1536), who married firstly a member of the Catesby family, and secondly Brian Cave.
- Katherine Throckmorton (c. 1532-21 Dec 1553), who married firstly Thomas Winter, and secondly Thomas Smith.
- Margery Throckmorton(c. 1532-21 Dec 1553)who married Ralph Griffin in 1550 and had one son, Edward Griffin born 18 Feb 1551.
- Amy Throckmorton.
- Elizabeth Throckmorton.

== Death and legacy ==
Throckmorton died on 12 August 1552 and was buried in Coughton Church, where the monument he designed survives.

== Notes ==
Legal offices
Preceded by –	Justice of Peace in Warwickshire; 1510 – 6 August 1552	Succeeded by -
Parliament of England
Preceded by Sir Robert Throckmorton	Member of Parliament of England; 1529	Succeeded by Robert Throckmorton
