= Giles Brydges, 3rd Baron Chandos =

English courtier

The Right Honourable Giles Brydges 3rd Baron Chandos
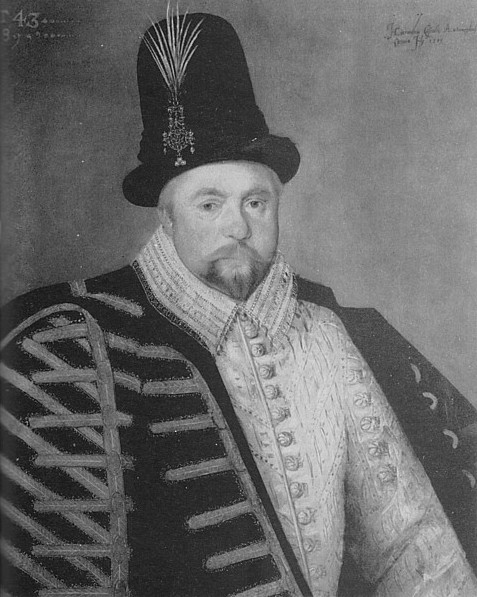
- Giles Brydges, 3rd Baron Chandos, 1589

Lord Lieutenant of Gloucestershire
- In office 1586–1594
- Monarch: Elizabeth I
- Preceded by: Edmund Brydges, 2nd Baron Chandos
- Succeeded by: William Brydges, 4th Baron Chandos

Member of Parliament for Cricklade
- In office 1571–1571
- Preceded by: Sir Nicholas Arnold

Member of Parliament for Gloucestershire
- In office 1572–1573

Personal details
- Born: c. 1548 Sudeley Castle
- Died: 21 February 1594 Sudeley Castle
- Spouse: Lady Frances Clinton
- Children: Elizabeth Brydges; Catherine Brydges; John Brydges; Charles Brydges
- Parent(s): Edmund Brydges, 2nd Baron Chandos; Hon. Dorothy Bray

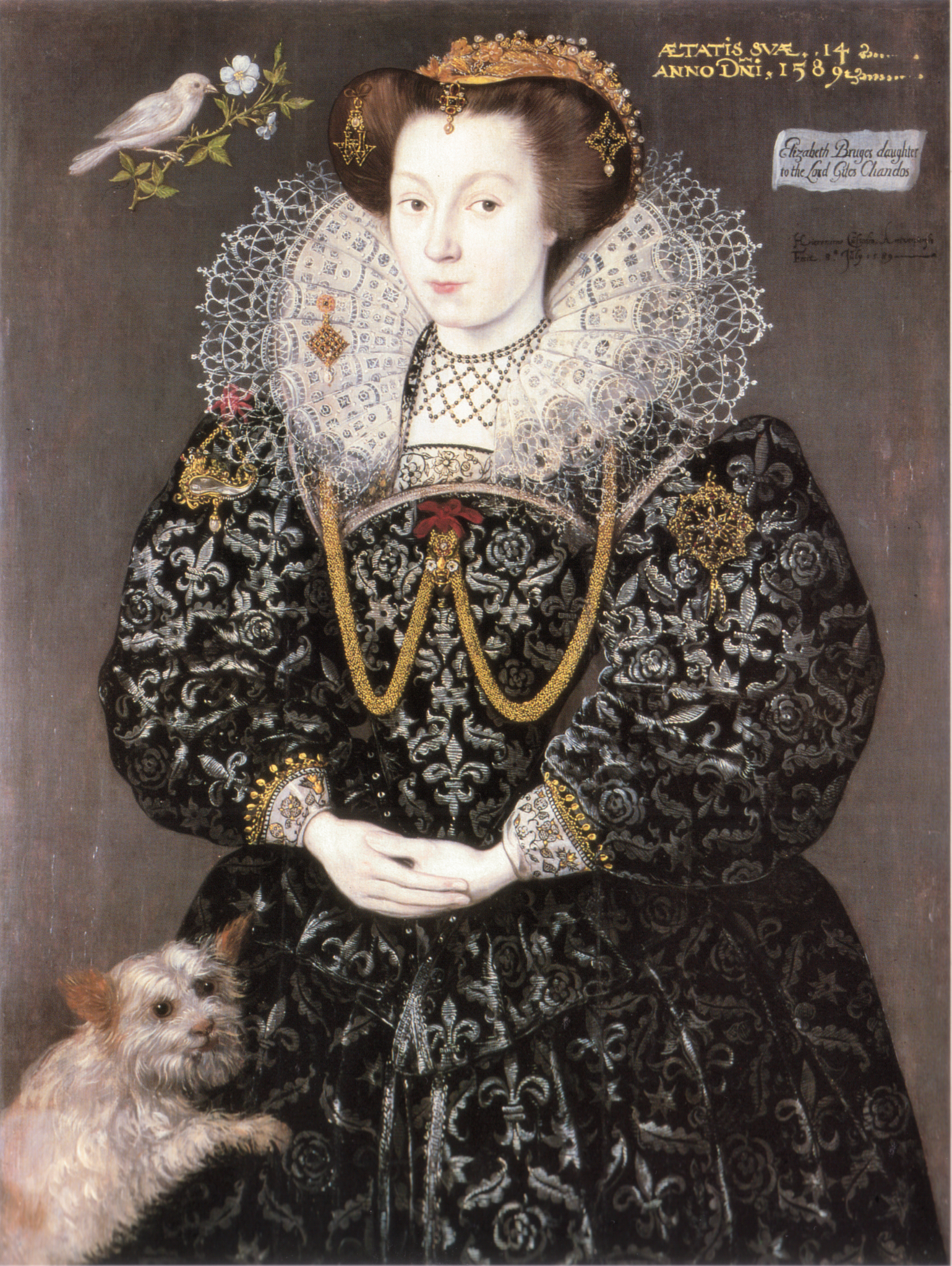
Signed and dated portrait of Elizabeth Brydges, aged 14, daughter of the 3rd Baron Chandos and maid of honour to Elizabeth I, 1589.

Giles Brydges, 3rd Baron Chandos of Sudeley (c. 1548 – 21 February 1594) was an English courtier in the reign of Elizabeth I.

== Life ==
He was born at Sudeley Manor, Gloucestershire, the son of Edmund Brydges, 2nd Baron Chandos and his wife Hon. Dorothy Bray. Brydges was member of parliament for Cricklade in 1571 and for Gloucestershire from 1572 to 1573. He succeeded his father as 3rd Baron Chandos of Sudeley on 11 March 1573 and held the office of Lord-Lieutenant of Gloucestershire in 1586. He entertained Queen Elizabeth at Sudeley Castle in 1592.

Chandos died on 21 February 1594 without male issue and was therefore succeeded by his brother William who became the fourth Baron Chandos of Sudeley. He is buried in the Chapel of St. Mary at Sudeley Castle in Winchcombe, England.

== Family ==
He married Lady Frances Clinton (Scrivelsby, Lincolnshire, 1553 – Woburn Abbey, Bedfordshire, 12 September 1623), daughter of Edward Clinton, 1st Earl of Lincoln and his second wife Ursula Stourton before 1573. According to Joan Barbara Greenbaum Goldsmith's unpublished PhD dissertation, All the Queen's Women: the changing place and perception of aristocratic women in Elizabethan England, 1558-1620, Frances and her husband separated during the 1590s. She died at Woburn Abbey, home of her daughter Catherine, Countess of Bedford.

They had four children of whom only two daughters survived:

- Elizabeth Brydges (c. 1578–1617), Maid of Honour to Elizabeth I, married Sir John Kennedy. She died without issue.
- Catherine Brydges (c. 1580–1656/7), married Francis Russell, 4th Earl of Bedford and had issue.
- John Brydges, died young.
- Charles Brydges, died young.

Portraits of Chandos, his wife, and his daughter Elizabeth by Hieronimo Custodis are in the collection of the Duke of Bedford at Woburn Abbey.

== Notes ==
Parliament of England
Preceded by Nicholas St. John; Anthony Throckmorton	Member of Parliament for Cricklade; 1571; With: Sir Nicholas Arnold	Succeeded by William Brydges; John Higford
Unknown	Member of Parliament for Gloucestershire; 1572–1573	Unknown
Political offices
Preceded by The 2nd Lord Chandos	Lord Lieutenant of Gloucestershire; 1586–1594	Succeeded by The 4th Lord Chandos
Peerage of England
Preceded by Edmund Brydges	Baron Chandos; 2nd creation 1573–1594	Succeeded by William Brydges
