= Ambrose Turvile =

English courtier and cupbearer (1581–1628)

Sir Ambrose Turvile (1581–1628) was a courtier and cupbearer to Anne of Denmark.

Some older genealogy references refer to him as Sir Thomas Turville.

He was the son of Geoffrey Turville, of Towerbank, All Hallows, Barking, London, and Mary Blakney or Blakeney (d. 1642) of Sparham, Norfolk. His mother was married three times.

The Turvile family estates were at Thurlaston, Leicestershire, however Ambrose's father was a younger son working at the Tower of London.

His sister Ann Turvile married Sir John Leeke of Edmonton. His step-sister by his mother's second marriage to William St Barbe, Ursula St Barbe (1587-1670) married Sir Francis Verney (d. 1615), a son of his mother's third husband Sir Edmund Verney (d. 1599) and his second wife Audrey Gardner (d. 1588) widow of Sir Peter Carew. After Francis's death, in 1619 Ursula married William son of Sir William Clark of Hitcham, and thirdly John Chicely.

Ambrose was knighted by James VI and I on 11 May 1603 and became Member of Parliament for Minehead in 1604. He died in 1628.

== Court service ==
Ambrose was a cupbearer or sewer in the household of Anne of Denmark. He bought the office from Sir Archibald Murray. His mother, now after her third marriage Lady Mary Verney, joined him as a gentlewoman in the queen's privy chamber. He was again a cupbearer for Henrietta Maria.

His half-brother Edmund Verney (1590-1642) followed him into court service as a cupbearer to Henry Frederick, Prince of Wales in 1611, with a recommendation from Princess Elizabeth solicited by Mary Verney. The letter mentioned his half-brother, Sir Francis Verney, who had become a Barbary corsair and was said to have converted to Islam. Edmund Verney was later a gentleman of the privy chamber to Prince Charles.

== Family ==
Ambrose married Eleanor (or Joan) Brydges, daughter of William Brydges, 4th Baron Chandos and Mary Hopton, and sister of the Frances Brydges, second wife of Thomas Cecil, 1st Earl of Exeter. She died of smallpox in July 1616. Their children included;

- Sir Frederick Turvile, married Frances Ashburnham daughter of Elizabeth Richardson, 1st Lady Cramond.
- Sir Francis Turvile (d. 1623), buried at Langley, Berkshire.
