= George Berkeley, 8th Baron Berkeley =

English nobleman

His wall monument, St Dunstan's Church, Cranford

George Berkeley, 8th Baron Berkeley, KB (1601 – 10 August 1658) was a seventeenth-century English nobleman and a prominent patron of literature in his generation.

== Family ==
George Berkeley, baptized 26 October 1601 at Low Leyton, Essex, was the only surviving son of Sir Thomas Berkeley (11 July 1575 – 22 November 1611) and Elizabeth Carey, daughter and sole heir of George Carey, 2nd Baron Hunsdon.

He was the paternal grandson of Henry Berkeley, 7th Baron Berkeley (d. 26 November 1613), by his first wife, Katherine Howard (d. 7 April 1596), third daughter of Henry Howard, Earl of Surrey and Frances de Vere, daughter of John de Vere, 15th Earl of Oxford and Elizabeth Trussell.

== Career ==
Berkeley's childhood was spent in Warwickshire, where he was a pupil of the translator, Philemon Holland of Coventry, and of Henry Ashwood.

He succeeded to his titles of Baron Berkeley of Berkeley, Mowbray, Segrave, & Breuse of Gower at the death of his grandfather, Henry Berkeley, 7th Baron Berkeley, on 26 November 1613. His family seat was at Berkeley Castle in Gloucestershire. He was made a Knight of the Order of the Bath on 4 November 1616, when Prince Charles was made Prince of Wales. He was educated at Christ Church, Oxford, and received his M.A. degree from the university in 1623. He was made a member of the Council of Wales and the Marches in 1633.

Berkeley supported a range of important writers in the Jacobean and Caroline eras. A number of significant figures dedicated their works to him in gratitude for his patronage—;or in hope of receiving it. These included Robert Burton, who dedicated The Anatomy of Melancholy to Berkeley upon its publication in 1621. Berkeley was a notable patron of English Renaissance drama: Philip Massinger dedicated his play The Renegado to Berkeley on its 1630 publication, as James Shirley did his The Young Admiral in 1637. John Webster dedicated The Duchess of Malfi to Berkeley in 1623. The wording of Webster's dedication suggests that Webster was seeking Berkeley's patronage rather than acknowledging support already given; it is not known to what degree the supplication was effective.

Through both his own and his wife's families Berkeley was connected with established traditions of support for literature. His maternal grandfather had backed the Lord Chamberlain's Men, the acting company of William Shakespeare. Berkeley himself has been described as "a friend of the King's Men." His wife was connected to Katherine Stanhope, the dedicatee of Massinger's The Duke of Milan.

At his death in 1658, Berkeley was succeeded as 9th Baron Berkeley by his second son, also named George Berkeley.

(Note: members of the Berkeley family, the descendants of Robert Fitzharding, are usually referred to by the Berkeley surname. The 8th Baron is George Berkeley in many sources. In his own era, however, in the dedications of contemporaneous works such as The Duchess of Malfi, he is identified as George Harding.)

== Marriage and issue ==
Berkeley married, on 13 April 1614, Elizabeth Stanhope (d. 1669), the second daughter and coheir of Sir Michael Stanhope of Sudbourne, Suffolk, by Anne Reade (b. 21 December 1604), the daughter of Sir William Reade of Osterley, Middlesex. The marriage produced three children, but had broken down by 1630:

- Charles (1623–41) drowned, when returning to England from France.
- Elizabeth (1624–61) married Edward, eldest son of John Coke of Holkham, Norfolk
- George Berkeley, 1st Earl of Berkeley

== Notes ==
Peerage of England
Preceded by Henry Berkeley	Baron Berkeley; 1613–1658	Succeeded by George Berkeley
