= Henry Reynolds (poet) =

English schoolmaster, poet and literary critic

Henry Reynolds (1564–1632) was an English schoolmaster poet and literary critic of the seventeenth century.

Born in Suffolk, he is known for two works: Aminta Englisht of 1628, a translation of Tasso, and Mythomystes, a 1632 critical work on poetry considered to be heavily influenced by the Neoplatonism of the early Italian Renaissance. He was the dedicatee of a 1627 poem by Michael Drayton.

In 1611 he was rumoured to be planning to marry Elizabeth Brydges, and then the widow of a Mr Evans a clerk of Parliament.

Otherwise there is sparse biographical information.

== Works ==
- Aminta, Englisht. The Henry Reynolds translation (1972). Edited by Clifford Davidson, appendix by Robert Dean. ISBN 0-87423-007-1
- Mythomystes (1972) Scolar Press reprint ISBN 0-85417-856-2, ISBN 978-0-85417-856-8
