= Thomas Brydges =

English landowner and politician

Sir Thomas Brydges (died 14 November 1559) was an English landowner, a royal office holder and MP for Oxfordshire in first parliament of Elizabeth I (January 1559).

== Biography ==
Brydges was the second son of Sir Giles Brydges (died 1511) of Coberley, Gloucestershire, and his wife, Isabel Baynham. His elder brother was John, Lord Chandos, and his patronage at court helped Thomas Brydges' career.

As a substantial landowner and member of the Oxfordshire gentry Brydges carried out various duties for his sovereign. In 1544 he mustered troops for the French campaign, and he was later posted to Boulogne (besieged during the campaign) as surveyor. He was in 1548 steward of the hundred of Chadlington and of the royal manors of Burford and Minster Lovell, and keeper of Wychwood Forest and of the parks of Langley and Cornbury.

In 1554 as deputy lieutenant of the Tower (a post he held under his brother who was the Lieutenant) he was present at the execution of Lady Jane Grey. He had been well rewarded by King Edward VI's regime for his loyalty and was granted many abbey lands. He remained loyal to the Tudor dynasty and during the reign of Mary I as Justice of the Peace in Oxfordshire, he attended the burning of Thomas Cranmer at Oxford in 1556 .

In 1558, during the first year of Queen Elizabeth's reign he represented Oxfordshire in her first parliament. He resided at Cornbury, and when he died the next year was buried at Chadlington.

== Family ==
Brydges married first Jane, daughter and coheir of John Sydenham of Orchard, Somerset. His second wife, mentioned in his will, was named Anne. His son Thomas was drowned off London Bridge on 10 August 1553.

== Notes ==
Political offices
Preceded by Sir William Rainsford	High Sheriff of Berkshire and Oxfordshire; 1556–1557	Succeeded by John Denton
