= Anthony Throckmorton =

16th-century English politician

Anthony Throckmorton (Throgmorton) (1528 – 1592) was a royal courtier, landowner and recusant. He served as an MP in one Elizabethan parliament.

== Life ==
Throckmorton was one of the younger sons of Sir George Throckmorton of Coughton and his wife Katherine Vaux, the eldest daughter of Nicholas Vaux of Harrowden by his first wife Elizabeth FitzHugh.

He became a courtier and in 1553 was made keeper of Haseley Park, Warwickshire by Mary I. He also joined The Mercers' Company from whom he leased properties in London. By April 1555 he had married Katherine (d. 1593) daughter and co-heir of William Willington (d. 1555) of Barcheston, Warwickshire and widow of Richard Kempe and William Catesby of Lapworth, Warwickshire. Through her second husband Katherine held the manor of Chastleton, Oxfordshire for life and this became their main residence outside London.

In 1563 he sat as MP for Cricklade, a borough where his relation by marriage Edmund Brydges, 2nd Baron Chandos dominated elections. He was a recusant, being presented in 1577 for non-attendance at Church. He also suffered periodic bouts of imprisonment in the last 15 years of his life, in part perhaps due to his relationship to his nephew, the conspirator Francis Throckmorton. (Katherine was also grandmother of the future conspirator Robert Catesby.)

He died in 1592, leaving a will that affirmed his Catholic faith. Despite the harsh financial penalties imposed on recusants, he remained a wealthy man.

== Children ==
Anthony and Katherine had at least four sons and five daughters as follows:

- Thomas Throckmorton (1555–1598).
- John Throckmorton, (1555).
- George Throckmorton, (1567–1612).
- Robert Throckmorton, (1569–1577).
- Anne Throckmorton
- Mary Throckmorton (1556–1643), who married John Stratford of Farmcote, Gloucestershire.
- Katherine Throckmorton married Robert Acton of Ribbesford, Worcs.
- Margaret Throckmorton (born 1571).
- Elizabeth Throckmorton (1573–1636) married Richard Acton, brother of Robert.
