= Grey Brydges, 5th Baron Chandos =

English courtier

Grey Brydges
- Baron Chandos of Sudeley
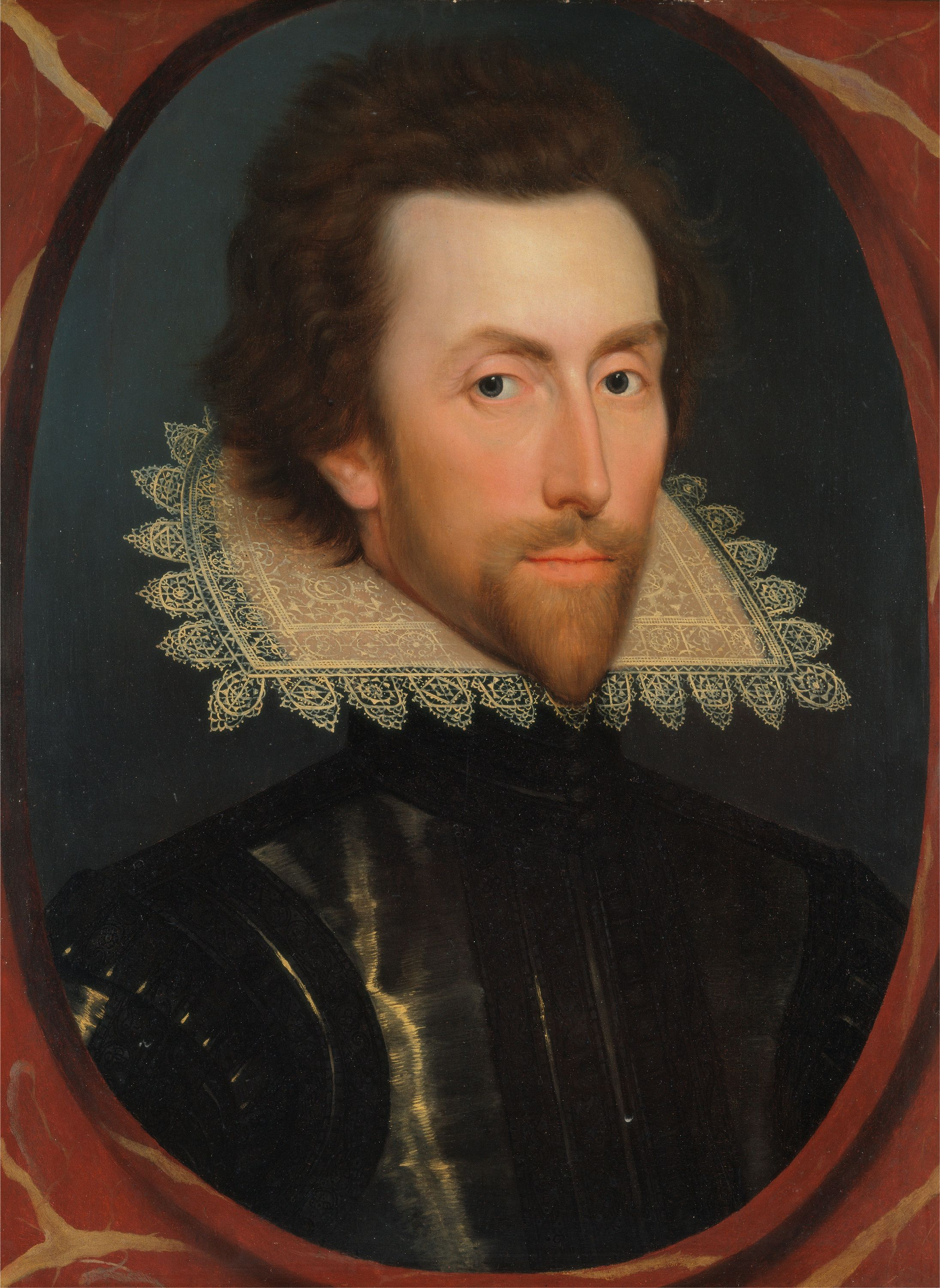
- Grey Brydges, 5th Baron Chandos
- Tenure: 18 November 1602 – 10 August 1621
- Predecessor: William Brydges, 4th Baron Chandos
- Successor: George Brydges, 6th Baron Chandos
- Born: c. 1580
- Died: 10 August 1621 (aged 41); Spa, Belgium
- Buried: Sudeley Castle
- Residence: Sudeley Castle
- Spouse: Lady Anne Stanley
- Issue: Anne Brydges; Elizabeth Brydges, Countess of Castlehaven; George Brydges, 6th Baron Chandos; William Brydges, 7th Baron Chandos
- Parents: William Brydges, 4th Baron Chandos; Mary Hopton

Grey Brydges, 5th Baron Chandos (c. 1580 – 10 August 1621) of Sudeley Castle in Gloucestershire, was an English nobleman and courtier.

== Early life ==
He was the only son of William Brydges, 4th Baron Chandos, who died on 18 November 1602, and Mary Hopton, who was daughter of Sir Owen Hopton. He was M.P. for Cricklade, in 1597.

Brydges and his family were friendly with Robert Devereux, 2nd Earl of Essex. His father visited Essex at Essex House on the Sunday morning (8 February 1601) of Essex's insurrection, but he was not deemed by the government to be implicated in the conspiracy. The son, Grey Brydges, was, however, suspected of immediate complicity, and was sent to the Fleet Prison with Henry Cuffe and others; but he was soon released.

== Courtier and grandee ==
Grey Brydges succeeded his father as Baron Chandos in 1602, attended King James I of England's initial parliament on 19 March 1604, and was made Knight of the Bath, when Prince Charles Stewart was created Duke of York in January 1605. He visited Oxford with King James I, and was granted the degree of M.A. on 30 August 1605. On 2 July 1609, he was appointed keeper of Ditton Park, Buckinghamshire, for life. He attended the funeral of Henry Frederick, Prince of Wales, in 1612. Grey also took an active part in the court masques and tournaments. It was reported at court on 9 September 1613 that a duel was to be fought by him and the King's favourite, Lord James Hay. He became Lord Lieutenant of Gloucestershire and was called the "King of the Cotswolds", owing to his generosity and his magnificent style of living at his residence, Sudeley Castle.

== Traveller ==
In 1608 he went travelling with Degory Wheare. In 1610 he was appointed one of the officers under Sir Edward Cecil in command of an expedition to the Low Countries, in the War of the Jülich succession. The Emperor Rudolph II's forces were besieging Juliers, and the English had combined with Holland and France to protect the town. Sir Edward Herbert was Chandos's companion through this campaign. Chandos lodged at Juliers with Sir Horace Vere, but does not seem to have taken much part in the fighting. Afterwards he attended Antoine de Pluvinel's academy in Paris, and then went to Blois.

== Later life ==
On 23 July 1612, Grey Brydges visited Spa in the Low Countries, for his health; he had been there before during the Jülich campaign. On 14 July 1616, there was some talk of making him President of Wales, and on 8 November 1617, he was appointed to receive ambassadors from Muscovy, then in England. His health was still failing, and after trying in 1618, the waters of Newenham Mills in Warwickshire, he returned to Spa, where he died suddenly on 10 August 1621, while taking in the waters there. His body was brought to Sudeley Castle, and buried there. An elegy for him was written by Sir John Beaumont.

== Horae Subsecivae ==
Chandos has been regarded by Horace Walpole and others as the author of some essays, Horae Subsecivae. These were published by Edward Blount, and from topical references would appear to have been written about 1615. The attribution is moot: Michael Lort and Samuel Egerton Brydges supported Walpole's view. Anthony à Wood and White Kennett had earlier stated that Gilbert Cavendish, eldest son of William Cavendish, 1st Earl of Devonshire, was the author of the work. Copies are extant with the name of Lord Chandos inscribed on the title page in seventeenth-century handwriting.

Edmond Malone and Thomas Park, the editor of Walpole, attributed the book on the grounds of Gilbert's age to William, a brother. A modern view agrees to the extent that 10 of the essays can be shown to have been written by William (for his father) in 1615, at a time when Thomas Hobbes was his tutor. (There is another view, which is that this collection is Hobbes's own work.) The published essays come as 12 shorter pieces (the 10 by William being among those); and four longer ones, now attributed one to William (on flattery, based on a piece from 1611) and three to Hobbes.

== Family ==
On 28 February 1607, he married Lady Anne Stanley, daughter of Ferdinando Stanley, 5th Earl of Derby and Lady Alice Spencer. His wife Anne, a great-great-granddaughter of King Henry VIII's sister, Princess Mary Tudor, had been heiress presumptive to the throne of England; she was, however, passed over for King James VI of Scotland.

The couple had the following five children:

- Robert Brydges (b. 1611), died young.
- Anne Brydges (b. 1612): she did marry, reputedly to a Mr Torteson but little is known about her later life and whether there were any issue. Issue has never been ruled out, there is little firm evidence about her life after childhood.
- Elizabeth Brydges (1619–1678), married her stepbrother, James Tuchet, 3rd Earl of Castlehaven.
- George Brydges, 6th Baron Chandos (1620–1654), married firstly, Lady Susan Montagu, daughter of Henry Montagu, 1st Earl of Manchester; married secondly, Lady Jane Savage, daughter of John Savage, 2nd Earl Rivers. From both his wives, he had altogether six daughters, but no sons.
- William Brydges, 7th Baron Chandos (1621–1676), married Susan Kerr. No issue.

== Notes ==
Attribution

This article incorporates text from a publication now in the public domain: "Brydges, Grey". Dictionary of National Biography. London: Smith, Elder & Co. 1885–1900.

Political offices
Preceded by The Lord Berkeley	Lord Lieutenant of Gloucestershire; 1613–1621	Succeeded by The Earl of Northampton
Preceded by Sir John Poyntz	Custos Rotulorum of Gloucestershire; Date unknown – 1621	Succeeded by John Bridgeman
Peerage of England
Preceded by William Brydges	Baron Chandos; 2nd creation 1602–1621	Succeeded by George Brydges
