= Hieronimo Custodis =

Flemish painter

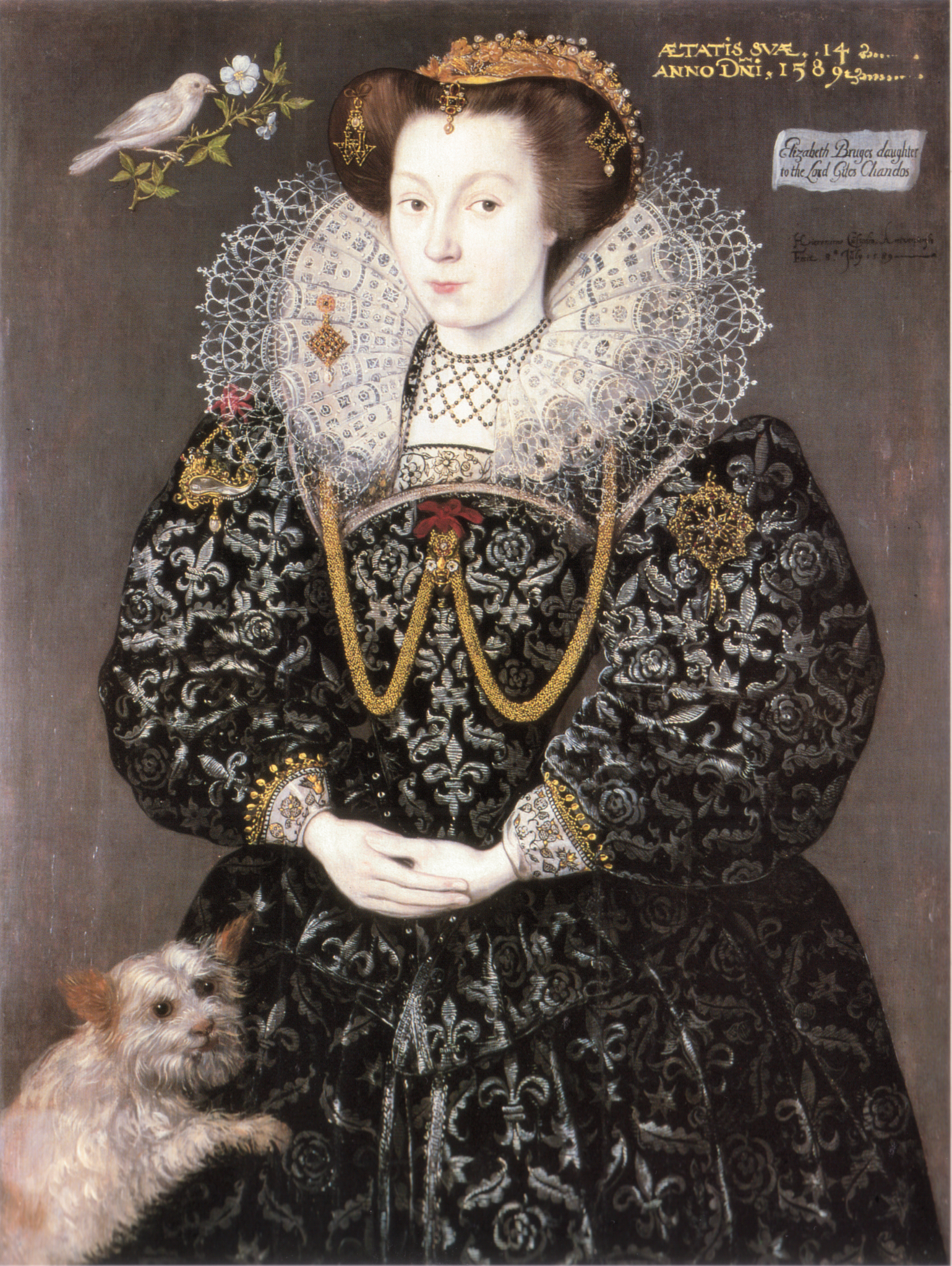
Signed and dated portrait of Elizabeth Brydges, aged 14, daughter of Giles Brydges, 3rd Baron Chandos, and maid of honour to Elizabeth I, 1589

Hieronimo Custodis (also spelled Hieronymus, Heironimos) (died c. 1593) was a Flemish portrait painter active in England in the reign of Elizabeth I.

== Life and work ==
A native of Antwerp, Custodis was one of many Flemish artists of the Tudor court who had fled to England to avoid the persecution of Protestants in the Spanish Netherlands. He is thought to have arrived in England sometime after the fall of Antwerp to the forces of the Duke of Parma in 1585.

Three English portraits by Custodis signed and dated 1589 firmly establish him as resident in London by that year. Sir Roy Strong attributes a portrait of Sir Henry Bromley dated 1587 to Custodis, suggesting an earlier arrival, and has verified the recent attribution of a portrait of the young Edward Talbot dated 1586 to Custodis. In 1591, he was living in the parish of St Bodolph-without-Aldgate where "Jacobus the son of Ieronyme Custodis A Paynter" was baptised on 2 March. He is assumed to have died in 1593, as all of his known works are dated between 1589 and 1593, and his widow remarried that year.

Custodis's unsigned but dated works are identified by "palaeographical peculiarities" in the inscriptions which can be closely matched to those in his signed portraits.

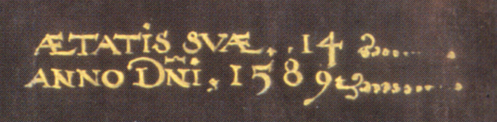
Characteristic inscription by Custodis, from the signed and dated portrait of Elizabeth Brydges

== Gallery ==
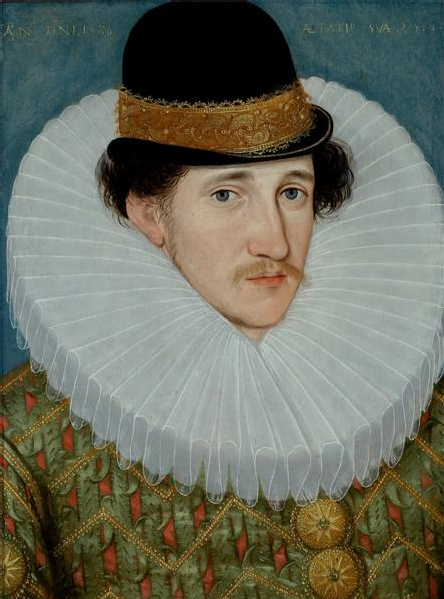
Edward Talbot, later 8th Earl of Shrewsbury, dated 1586

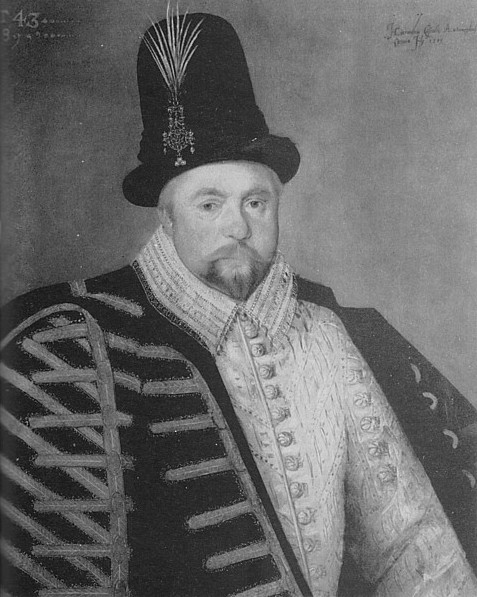
Giles Brydges, 3rd Baron Chandos, signed and dated 1589

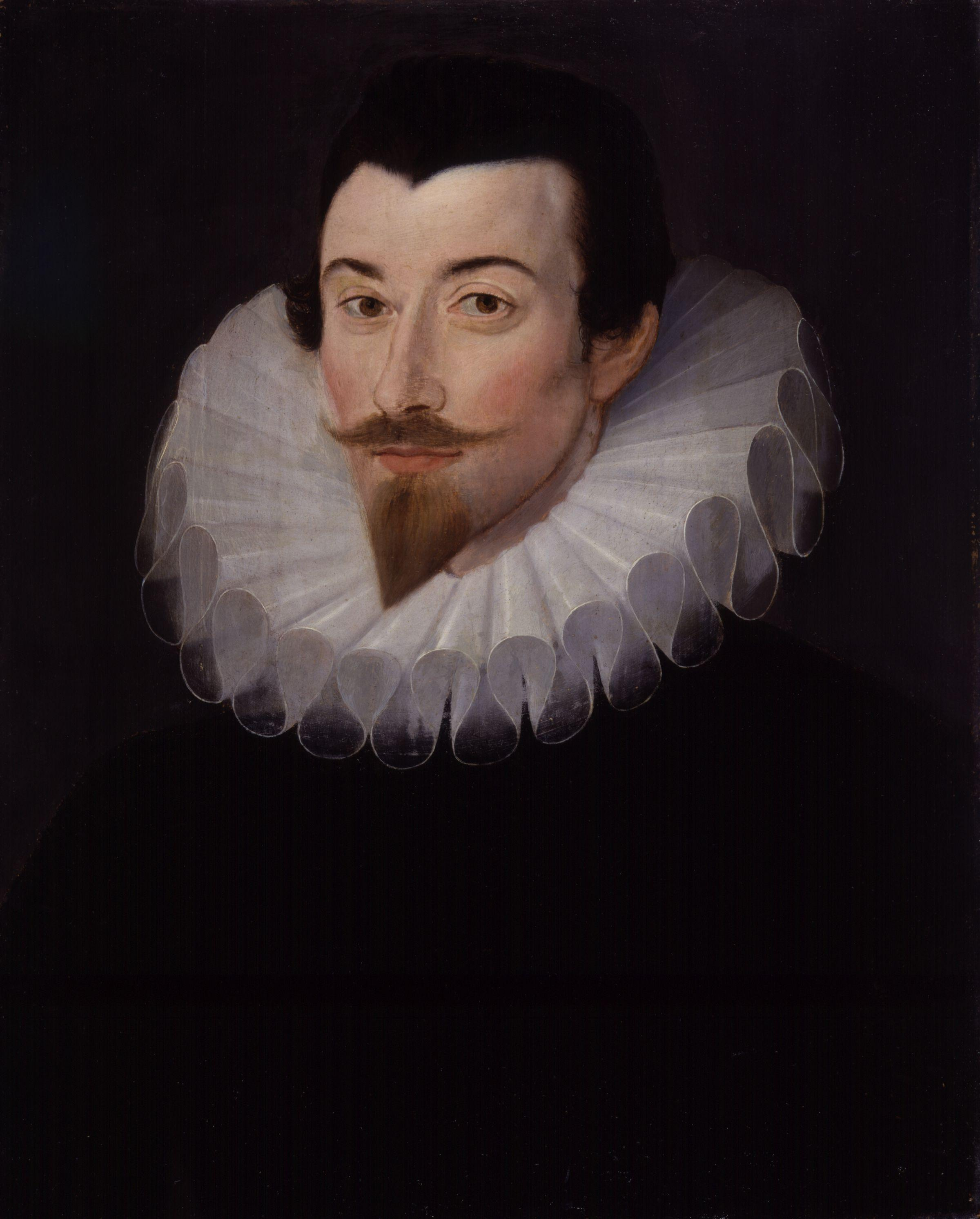
Sir John Harington of Kelston, c. 1590–93

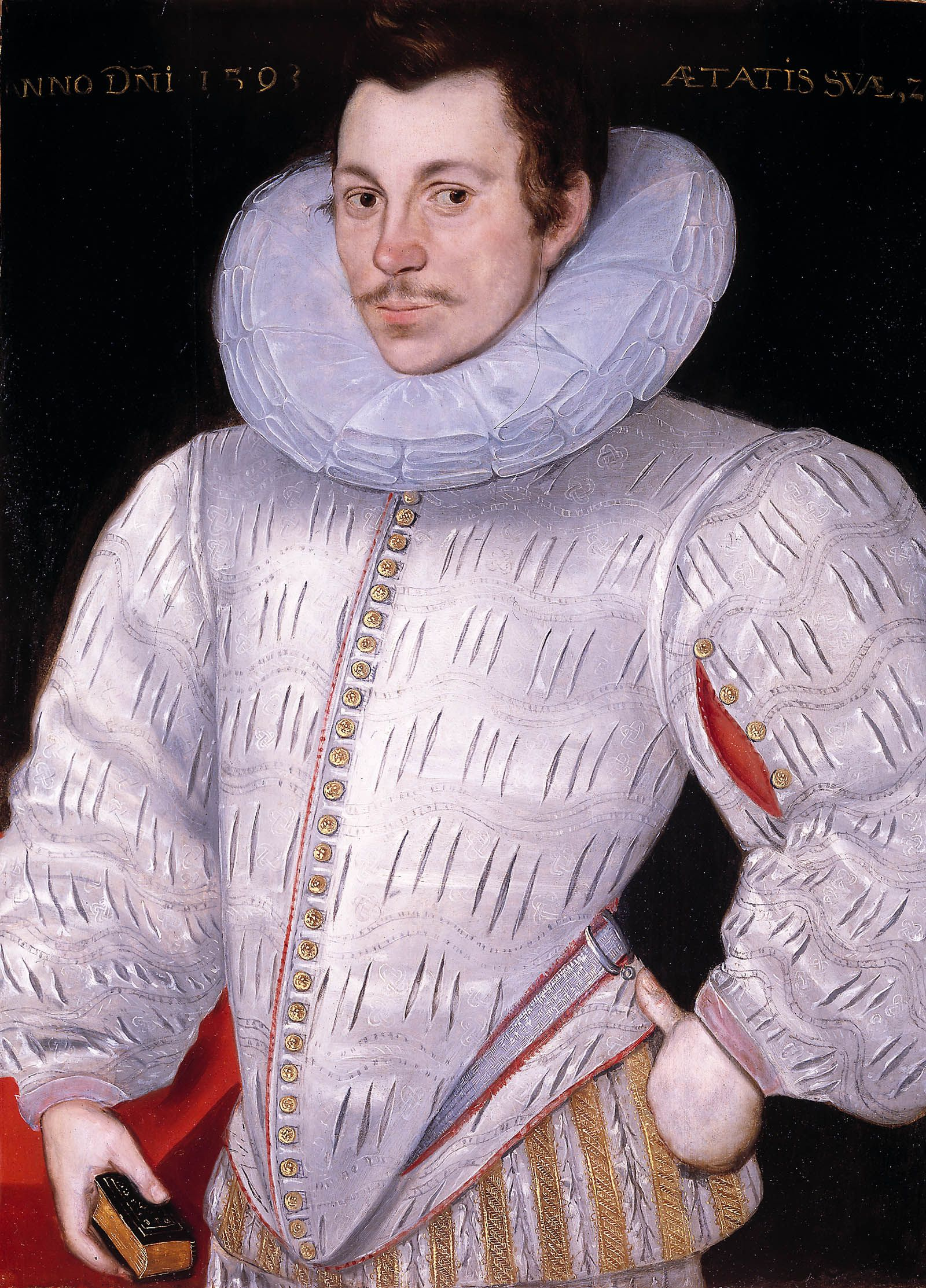
Sir John Ashburnham, 1593
