= George Brydges, 6th Baron Chandos =

English peer

The Right Honourable The Lord Chandos
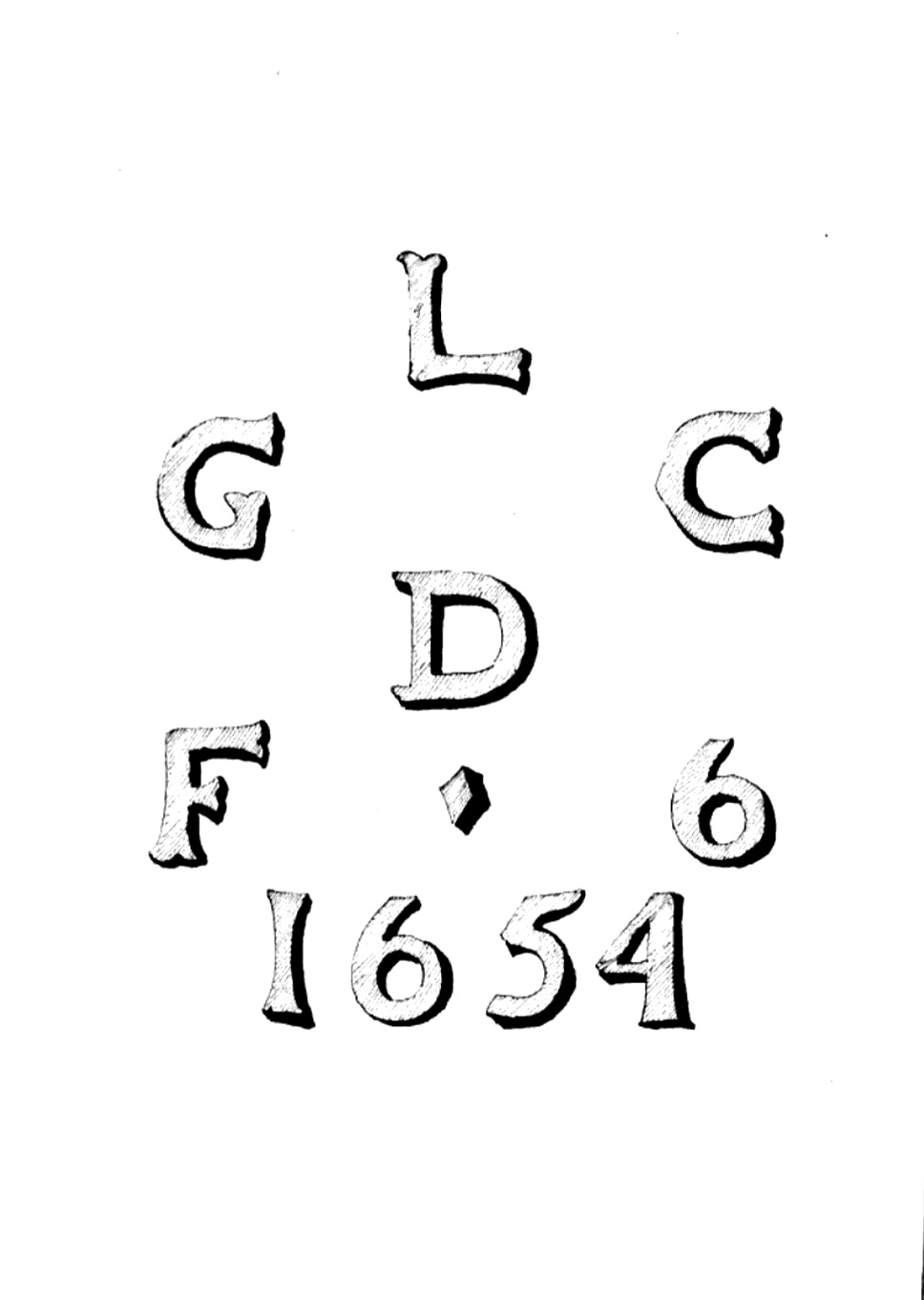
- Inscription on the leaden coffin of George Brydges, 6th Baron Chandos of Sudeley Inscription on the lead coffin of George Brydges

Lord Lieutenant of Gloucestershire
- In office 1641–1642
- Monarch: Charles I
- Preceded by: Spencer Compton, 2nd Earl of Northampton
- Succeeded by: English Interregnum

Personal details
- Born: 9 August 1620 Sudeley Castle, Kingdom of England
- Died: 6 February 1655 (aged 34) London, The Protectorate
- Resting place: St. Mary's Church, Sudeley Castle
- Spouses: Jane Savage; Susan Montagu
- Children: Lucy Brydges, 1st Viscountess Lisburne; Mary Brydges; Elizabeth Brydges, 2nd Countess of Inchiquin
- Parents: Grey Brydges, 5th Baron Chandos; Lady Anne Stanley

Military service
- Allegiance: Royalist
- Battles/wars: First English Civil War: Siege of Cirencester; Siege of Gloucester; First Battle of Newbury

George Brydges, 6th Baron Chandos (1620–1655), was an English peer who supported Charles I in the English Civil War.

== Life ==
He was born 9 August 1620, the elder son of Grey Brydges, 5th Baron Chandos (c. 1580 – 10 August 1621) and Lady Anne Stanley. His mother was the great-granddaughter of King Henry VIII's sister, Mary Tudor. Following his father's unexpected death in 1621, which left his mother with four young children and a modest income, his mother married the recently widowed Mervyn Tuchet, 2nd Earl of Castlehaven. George spent much of his childhood in the care of his maternal grandmother Alice Spencer, Countess of Derby. Following his death, Henry Montagu, 1st Earl of Manchester became his guardian. In February 1638 he went abroad to finish his education.

According to his later account, on reaching 21 and the end of his wardship he had an estate worth £3,120 per annum. His actual income was significantly reduced by the need to provide annuities for his mother and younger brother.

Through his possession of Sudeley Castle George was an important landowner in Gloucestershire, although his youth meant that he had not established himself as a political force. At the outbreak of the Civil War he received a Commission of array from the king. His attempt to execute this in Cirencester met with considerable opposition and he had to flee from the town. Rather than remain at Sudeley, a strategic stronghold, he went with men and plate to join the king, but remained an important figure in the royalist administration of the county. He subsequently distinguished himself at the first Battle of Newbury in 1643. However, following his failure to be appointed colonel-general by Prince Rupert of the Rhine in 1644 after the failure of the siege despite support from the Court, 'out of pure weariness of the fatigue' he went to London to seek a composition with parliament. By petitioning to compound then, his eventual fine was only for a tenth of his estate rather than a third.

In 1649, after the end of the civil war, Parliament ordered the slighting of Sudeley Castle, to ensure that it could never again be used as a military post. In 1650, he received some financial compensation for the loss of the castle but not enough for reconstruction. The castle remained semi-derelict. On the death of his mother in 1647, Lord Chandos had inherited Harefield Place, Middlesex. Two daughters were baptised at Harefield in 1650 and 1651 and his wife was buried there in 1652.

In 1651 he corresponded with Charles II, raising hopes that he would again act as a royalist leader in Gloucestershire. He was arrested in April 1651, but although bailed he fled abroad in May 1652 after killing Colonel Henry Compton, son of Sir Henry Compton in one of the first recorded duels at Putney. He returned the following year and was convicted of manslaughter and burned in the hand 'a strange doom for a nobleman'.

On 6 February 1655, he died of smallpox at his house in Covent Garden, and was buried at Sudeley. As he had a number of daughters but no male heir, he was succeeded by his younger brother William.

== Family ==
He married twice:

1. Lady Susan Montagu (d. 1652), daughter of his guardian Henry Montagu, 1st Earl of Manchester

2. Lady Jane Savage, daughter of John Savage, 2nd Earl Rivers. She was left a substantial estate by her husband, including his Gloucestershire estates and the manor of Haresfield. By her, he had a daughter, Lucy, who married Adam Loftus, 1st Viscount Lisburne. She subsequently married Sir William Sedley and George Pitt.

Political offices
Preceded by The Earl of Northampton	Lord Lieutenant of Gloucestershire; 1641–1642 with The Earl of Northampton	English Interregnum
Peerage of England
Preceded by Grey Brydges	Baron Chandos; 2nd creation 1621–1655	Succeeded by William Brydges
