= Edmund Brydges, 2nd Baron Chandos =

English politician and Baron

The Right Honourable Edmund Brydges 2nd Baron Chandos of Sudeley, KG
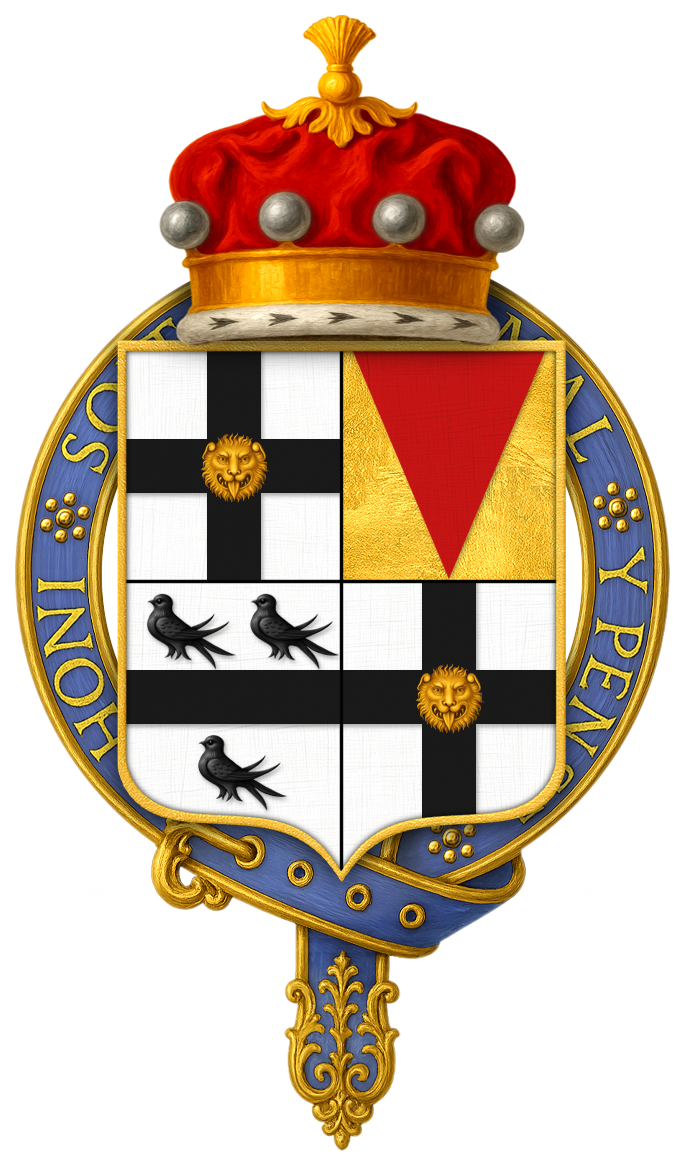
- Quartered arms of Sir Edmund Brydges

Vice-Admiral of Gloucestershire
- In office 1559–1573
- Monarch: Queen Elizabeth I
- Succeeded by: Giles Brydges, 3rd Baron Chandos

Lord Lieutenant of Gloucestershire
- In office 1559–1573
- Monarch: Queen Elizabeth I
- Succeeded by: Giles Brydges, 3rd Baron Chandos

Member of Parliament for Wootton Bassett
- In office 1545–1547
- Monarch: King Henry VIII

Constable of Sudeley Castle
- In office 1542–1573
- Preceded by: John Brydges, 1st Baron Chandos

Personal details
- Born: bef. 1522
- Died: 11 March 1573 Sudeley Castle
- Spouse: Dorothy Bray, Baroness Chandos
- Children: Giles Brydges, 3rd Baron Chandos; Catherine Brydges, Baroness Sandys; Eleanor Brydges of Chillington; William Brydges, 4th Baron Chandos
- Parents: John Brydges, 1st Baron Chandos; Elizabeth Gray

Military service
- Battles/wars: Italian War of 1542-46: Sieges of Boulogne; Rough Wooing: Battle of Pinkie

Edmund Brydges, 2nd Baron Chandos (before 1522 – 11 March 1573) was an English peer and politician. He was a Knight of the Garter, Baron Chandos, Lord Lieutenant of Gloucestershire and Vice-Admiral of Gloucestershire.

== Life ==
He was the eldest son and heir of John Brydges, 1st Baron Chandos of Sudeley Manor, Gloucestershire and Elizabeth Grey, daughter of Edmund Grey, 9th Lord Grey of Wilton. He succeeded to the barony on 12 April 1557 upon the death of his father.

He served in the army in France in 1544 and then in Scotland, being knighted in 1547 at the Battle of Pinkie Cleugh. He was elected Member of Parliament for Wootton Bassett in 1545 and knight of the shire for Gloucestershire in 1553. He was elevated to Knight of the Garter in 1572.

He was the first husband of Dorothy Bray, who, several years prior to their marriage in 1546, had engaged in a love affair at court with William Parr, 1st Marquess of Northampton. Chandos and Dorothy together had five sons and a daughter.

Chandos died in 1573 and was succeeded by his eldest son Giles Brydges, 3rd Baron Chandos and, after the death of Giles in 1594, by his younger son William Brydges, 4th Baron Chandos.

Peerage of England
Preceded by John Brydges	Baron Chandos; 2nd creation 1557–1573	Succeeded by Giles Brydges
