= Lord Lieutenant of Gloucestershire =

Civil post in Gloucestershire, England

This is a list of people who have served as Lord Lieutenant of Gloucestershire. Since 1694, all the Lord Lieutenants have also been Custos Rotulorum of Gloucestershire.

- Edmund Brydges, 2nd Baron Chandos 1559–?
- Giles Brydges, 3rd Baron Chandos 17 November 1586 – 1 February 1594
- William Brydges, 4th Baron Chandos 9 September 1595 – 18 November 1602
- Henry Berkeley, 7th Baron Berkeley 13 August 1603 – 20 November 1613
- Grey Brydges, 5th Baron Chandos 23 December 1613 – 10 August 1621
- William Compton, 1st Earl of Northampton 16 March 1622 – 24 June 1630
- Spencer Compton, 2nd Earl of Northampton 17 July 1630 – 1642 jointly with
- George Brydges, 6th Baron Chandos 3 August 1641 – 1642
- William Fiennes, 1st Viscount Saye and Sele 1642 (Parliamentary)
- Interregnum
- Henry Somerset, 1st Duke of Beaufort 30 July 1660 – 1689
- Charles Gerard, 1st Earl of Macclesfield 22 March 1689 – 7 January 1694
- Charles Berkeley, 2nd Earl of Berkeley 25 May 1694 – 24 September 1710
- James Berkeley, 3rd Earl of Berkeley 30 November 1710 – 1712
- Henry Somerset, 2nd Duke of Beaufort 6 March 1712 – 24 May 1714
- James Berkeley, 3rd Earl of Berkeley 21 October 1714 – 17 August 1736
- Augustus Berkeley, 4th Earl of Berkeley 21 April 1737 – 9 January 1755
- Matthew Ducie Moreton, 2nd Baron Ducie 19 February 1755 – 1758
- John Howe, 2nd Baron Chedworth 13 November 1758 – 9 May 1762
- Norborne Berkeley, 4th Baron Botetourt 4 June 1762 – 1766
- Frederick Augustus Berkeley, 5th Earl of Berkeley 5 July 1766 – 8 August 1810
- Henry Somerset, 6th Duke of Beaufort 15 September 1810 – 2 December 1835
- William Berkeley, 1st Baron Segrave 18 December 1835 – 10 October 1857 (created Earl FitzHardinge in 1841)
- Henry Reynolds-Moreton, 3rd Earl of Ducie 13 November 1857 – 1911†
- William Lygon, 7th Earl Beauchamp 17 July 1911 – 1931†
- Henry Somerset, 10th Duke of Beaufort 6 November 1931 – 5 February 1984†
- Martin Gibbs 1984–1992
- Sir Henry Elwes 17 February 1992 – 24 October 2010
- Dame Janet Trotter 25 October 2010 – 29 October 2018
- Edward Gillespie 29 October 2018 –

† Lord Lieutenant of the County of Gloucester, and of the City and County of the City of Gloucester, and of the City and County of the City of Bristol.

== Deputy lieutenants ==
A deputy lieutenant of Gloucestershire is commissioned by the Lord Lieutenant of Gloucestershire. Deputy lieutenants support the work of the lord-lieutenant. There can be several deputy lieutenants at any time, depending on the population of the county. Their appointment does not terminate with the changing of the lord-lieutenant, but they usually retire at age 75.

=== 19th Century ===
- 10 March 1831: Maurice Fitzgerald Stephens
- 12 March 1831: Robert Canning.
- 24 March 1831: John Lewsley Codrington
- 5 April 1831: John Dela Field Phelps
