= John Brydges, 1st Baron Chandos =

English courtier, army officer and politician (1492–1557)

The Right Honourable The Lord Chandos
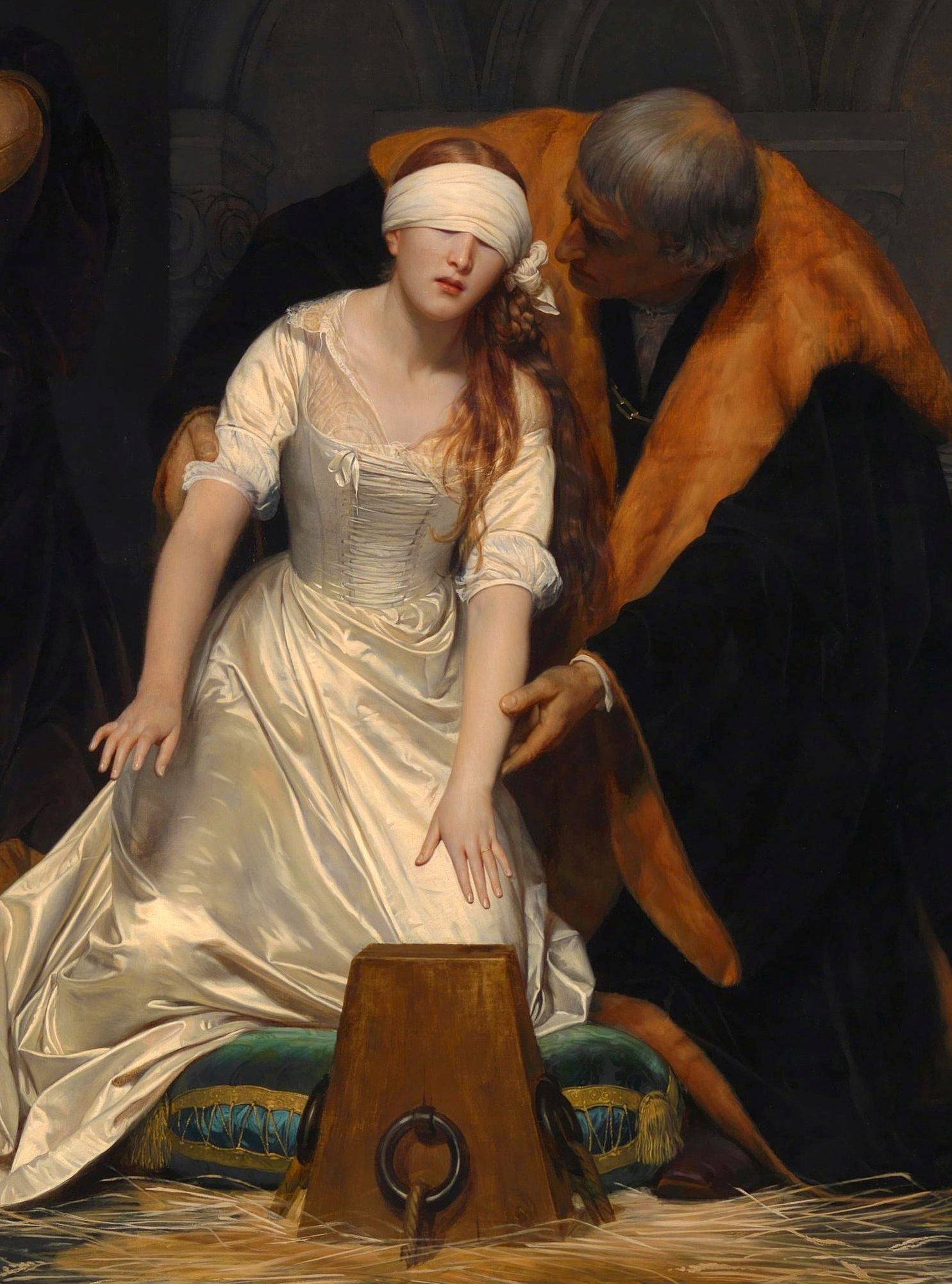
- 1833 depiction of Chandos (right) in The Execution of Lady Jane Grey

Lieutenant of the Tower of London
- In office 1554–1554
- Monarch: Mary I
- Preceded by: Sir Edward Warner
- Succeeded by: Sir Thomas Brydges

Groom of the Chamber
- In office 1539–1539
- Monarch: Henry VIII

Constable of Sudeley Castle
- In office 1538–1557
- Succeeded by: Edmund Brydges, 2nd Baron Chandos

High Sheriff of Wiltshire
- In office 1537–1537
- Preceded by: Sir Henry Long
- Succeeded by: Sir Anthony Hungerford

Personal details
- Born: 9 March 1492 Old Coberley Hall, Coberley, Gloucestershire
- Died: 12 April 1557 (aged 65) Sudeley Castle
- Spouse: Elizabeth Gray
- Children: Edmund Brydges, 2nd Baron Chandos; Katherine Brydges; Elizabeth Brydges; Frances Brydges; Henry Brydges; Charles Brydges
- Parents: Sir Giles Brydges; Isabel Baynham

Military service
- Allegiance: Kingdom of England
- Battles/wars: War of the League of Cambrai: Siege of Thérouanne; Siege of Tournai; Battle of the Spurs; Italian War of 1542-46: Sieges of Boulogne; Pilgrimage of Grace 1536 Wyatt's Rebellion 1554

John Brydges, 1st Baron Chandos (9 March 1492 – 12 April 1557) was an English courtier, army officer and politician. His last name is also sometimes spelt Brugge or Bruges. He was a prominent figure at the English court during the reigns of Kings Henry VIII and Edward VI and of Queen Mary I.

== Biography ==
He was born at Coberley, Gloucestershire, the son of Sir Giles Brydges of Coberley (c. 1462 – 1511) and Isabel Baynham. His father was a knight of the body to Henry VII and his brother Thomas Brydges of Cornbury, Oxfordshire also held public office and served as an MP. Bridges inherited his father's Oxfordshire and Wiltshire estates as a minor in 1511, and was for two years the ward of Sir Edward Darrell.

He was knighted in 1513 after serving in France with Charles Brandon at Terouenne and Tournai. He attended Henry VIII on all subsequent state occasions in England and France (presumably including the famous meeting with Francis I of France at the Field of the Cloth of Gold, where Gloucestershire was represented by, amongst others, a Sir John Brydges).

His election in 1529 as junior knight of the shire for Gloucestershire was a tribute to his standing both locally and at court, but it was doubtless assisted by his influential connections, through his mother with the Baynhams and through his wife with the noble house of Grey of Wilton.

Brydges was High Sheriff of Wiltshire for 1537, and took part in suppressing the rebellion of Sir Thomas Wyatt in 1554. As Lieutenant of the Tower of London during the earlier part of Queen Mary's reign, he had the custody not only of Lady Jane Grey and of Thomas Wyatt, but for a short time, of the Queen's half-sister as well, the Princess Elizabeth Tudor (who would later become Queen Elizabeth I of England).

In 1554, Queen Mary I gave Sudeley Castle to John Brydges and created him Baron Chandos of Sudeley on 8 April 1554. The castle remained his property throughout her reign and the reign of Queen Elizabeth I as well and then passed down to his descendants. It was at Sudeley Castle that Queen Elizabeth was entertained three times. Also, later on in 1592, a spectacular three-day feast was held there to celebrate the anniversary of the defeat of the Spanish Armada.

== Family ==
It was around 1512 when Brydges married Elizabeth Grey, daughter of Edmund Grey, 9th Baron Grey de Wilton (died 1511), and Florence Hastings, eldest daughter of Sir Ralph Hastings. They had eleven children.

Their son Edmund succeeded to the Chandos barony on his father's death. Their son Charles married Jane, daughter of Sir Edward Carne. Their daughter Katherine became a gentlewoman to Mary I, and married Edward Sutton, 4th Baron Dudley.

== Death ==
He died at Sudeley Castle on 12 April 1557 and was buried with heraldic ceremony on 3 May in Sudeley Church. His will, dated 2 March 1556, was proved on 28 May 1557. In his will, he styles himself as Sir John Bruges, Knight, Lord Chandos of Sudeley.

Lady Chandos died on 29 December 1559 and was buried on 6 January 1560.

== Notes ==
Peerage of England
New creation	Baron Chandos; 2nd creation 1554–1557	Succeeded by Edmund Brydges
