= Henry Berkeley, 7th Baron Berkeley =

English peer and politician

Henry Berkeley
- 7th Baron Berkeley
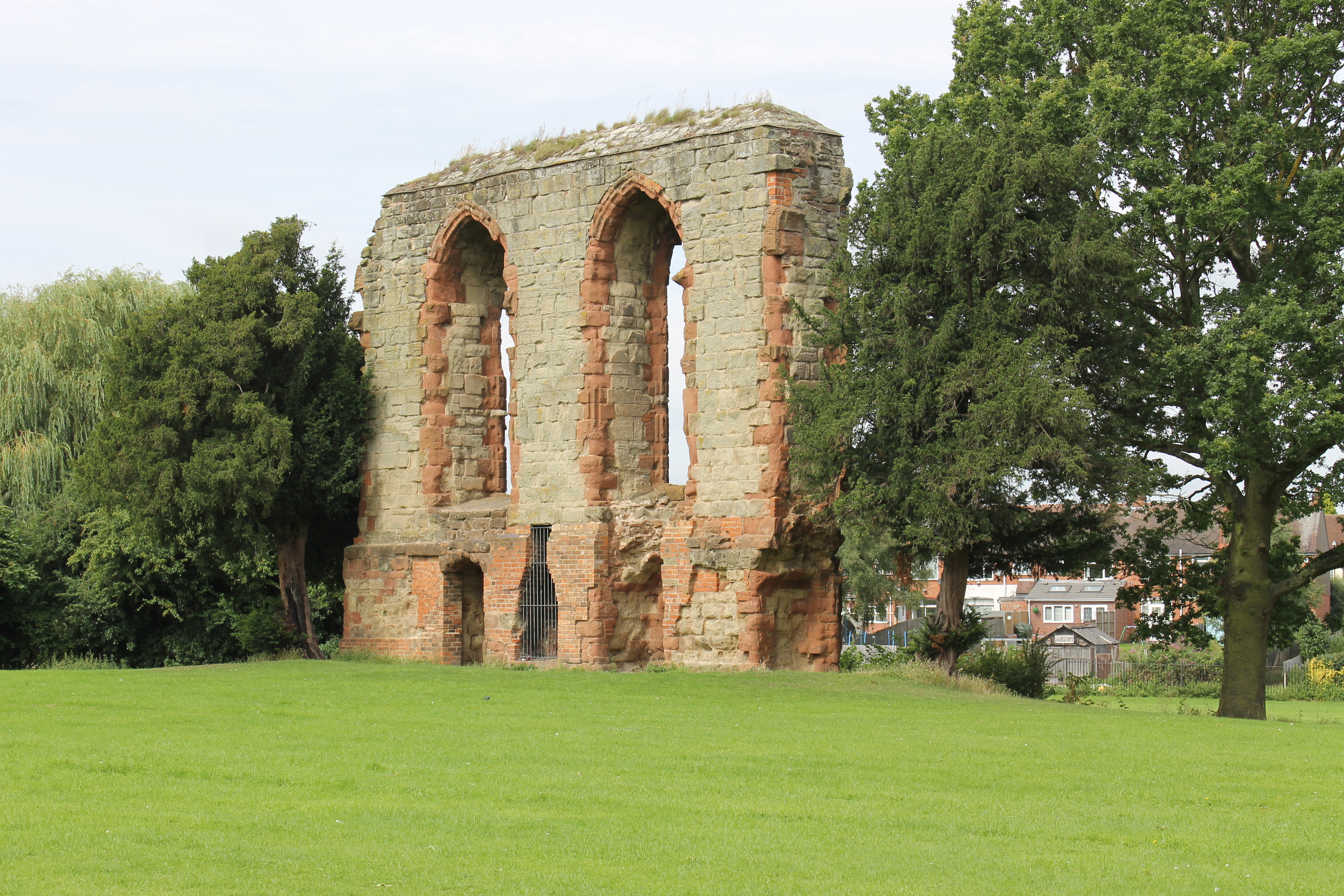
- Remains of Caludon Castle, once the home of Henry Berkeley, 7th Baron Berkeley
- Born: 26 November 1534
- Died: 26 November 1613 (aged 79); Caludon, Warwickshire, England
- Buried: Berkeley, Gloucestershire, England
- Noble family: Berkeley
- Spouses: Katherine Howard; Jane Stanhope
- Issue: Thomas Berkeley
- Father: Thomas Berkeley, 6th Baron Berkeley
- Mother: Anne Savage

Henry Berkeley, 7th Baron Berkeley, KB (26 November 1534 – 26 November 1613) was an English peer and politician. He was Lord Lieutenant and Vice-Admiral of Gloucestershire. He was the grandfather of George Berkeley, 8th Baron Berkeley.

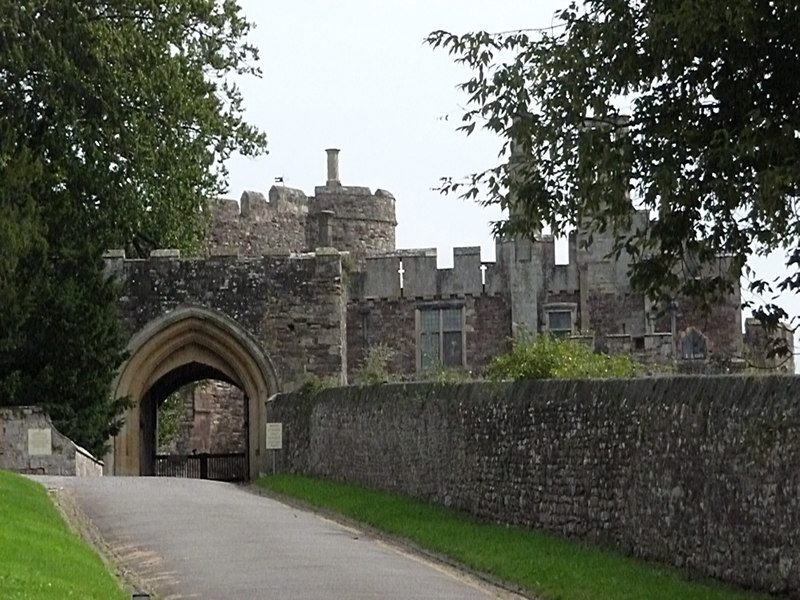
Berkeley Castle today

== Family ==
Henry Berkeley, sometimes called 'Henry the Harmlesse or Posthumous Henry', was born on 26 November 1534, nine weeks and four days after his father's death. He was the son of Thomas Berkeley, 6th Baron Berkeley (c. 1505 – 19 September 1534), and his second wife, Anne Savage (died October 1564), the daughter of Sir John Savage of Frodsham, Cheshire. The 6th Baron had earlier been married to Mary Hastings, the daughter of George Hastings, 1st Earl of Huntingdon, by Anne Stafford (d. March 1533), daughter of Henry Stafford, 2nd Duke of Buckingham, but had no issue by her.

== Career ==
Berkeley was made a Knight of the Bath on 28 September 1553 at the coronation of Mary I. In the following year, Berkeley Castle and other estates were restored to him when the line of male heirs of Henry VII was extinguished. As Simon Adams points out, "in 1487 William, Marquis Berkeley, had granted Berkeley Castle and its related manors to Henry VII and his heirs male. The crown's right having expired with Edward VI, they were restored to Henry, the 7th Lord Berkeley in December 1554." On 13 May 1555, he had livery of his lands, although still underage.

Berkeley is said to have rebuilt Caludon Castle about 1580, which had fallen into disrepair after the banishment from England in 1398 of Thomas Mowbray, 1st Duke of Norfolk, by Richard II.

He was Lord Lieutenant of Gloucestershire from 1603 until his death.

Berkeley died 26 November 1613, leaving a will dated 20 December 1612. He was succeeded by his grandson, George Berkeley, 8th Baron Berkeley. However, according to Andrew Warmington, the 8th Baron's inheritance was much diminished, as his grandfather had '"recently ended the 192-year legal feud over the estates with the Lisle family and their heirs, including the crown", and "due to this and Henry's extraordinary profligacy, the once vast estate had been reduced to twenty-five manors covering about 11,000 acres, mainly in Gloucestershire, with a rental value of some £1200 per year". Contemporaneous mention of this legal feud is made in Leicester's Commonwealth where the anonymous author, alluding to Robert Dudley, 1st Earl of Leicester, writes:

What shall I speak of others, whereof there would be no end? As of his dealing with Mr. Richard Lee for his manor of Hook Norton (if I fail not in the name); with Mr. Lodovick Greville, by seeking to bereave him of all his living at once if the drift had taken place; with George Whitney, in the behalf of Sir Henry Lee, for enforcing him to forgo the Controllership of Woodstock which he holdeth by patent from King Henry VII? With my Lord Berkeley, whom he enforced to yield up his lands to his brother Warwick which his ancestors had held quietly for almost two hundred years together?

As D.C. Peck explains:

Litigation over the Berkeley lands had been going on for two centuries; at this time it was pursued by the Dudleys against Henry (d. 1613), seventh Lord Berkeley, Lord Harry Howard's brother-in-law, from whom they were able to recover several manors. In August 1574, Leicester persuaded the Queen to leave her itinerary and be his guest at Berkeley Castle in its lord's absence, as if it were his own.

== Marriages and issue ==
Berkeley first married, in September 1554, at Kenninghall, Norfolk, Katherine Howard, third daughter of Henry Howard, Earl of Surrey, and Frances de Vere, daughter of John de Vere, 15th Earl of Oxford, and Elizabeth Trussell:

- Sir Thomas Berkeley(1575-1611) predeceased his father leaving a son, George.
- Mary (b. 1557) married John Zouche of Codnor, Derbyshire
- Frances (1561-1595)married George Shirley of Staunton Harold, Leicestershire and was the mother of Sir Henry Shirley and the antiquary Thomas Shirley.

Berkeley's first wife, Katherine, died of dropsy at Caludon on 7 April 1596, and was buried on 20 May near the Drapers Chapel at St Michael's, Coventry. Katherine was fond of field sports, and said to be 'so good an archer at butts with the longbow, as her side, by her, was never the weaker'. She was also fond of falconry, and 'kept commonly a cast or two of merlins, mewed in her own chamber, to the detriment of her gowns and kirtles'.

Berkeley married for a second time, on 9 March 1598 at St Giles, Cripplegate, Jane Stanhope (c. 1547–1618), widow of Sir Roger Townshend (d. 1590), and daughter of Sir Michael Stanhope (d. 1552) of Shelford, Nottinghamshire, by his wife, Anne Rawson, daughter of Nicholas Rawson of Aveley, Essex. Berkeley's second wife, Jane, had two sons by her previous marriage, Sir John Townshend (1567/68–1603) and Sir Robert Townshend (b. 1580). She died at her house in the Barbican on 3 January 1618, leaving a will dated 20 July 1617 which was proved by her grandson, Sir Roger Townshend, 1st Baronet, on 10 March 1618.

== Notes ==
Peerage of England
Preceded by Thomas Berkeley	Baron Berkeley; 1534–1613	Succeeded by George Berkeley
