= Chandos Jubilate =

Anthem by George Frideric Handel

George Frideric Handel

Chandos Jubilate, HWV246, is a common name for a choral composition by George Frideric Handel. It was published as the first of the Chandos Anthems, and is known also as Chandos Anthem No. 1 and as Jubilate in D major. A setting of Psalm 100, "O, be joyful in the Lord", it is the first in a series of church anthems that Handel composed between 1717 and 1718, when he was composer in residence to James Brydges, later 1st Duke of Chandos. The anthem was probably first performed at St. Lawrence's church, Whitchurch, near Brydges' country house. The work is written for a small ensemble of instrumentalists, solo singers and choir, and is approximately twenty minutes in length.

== Background ==
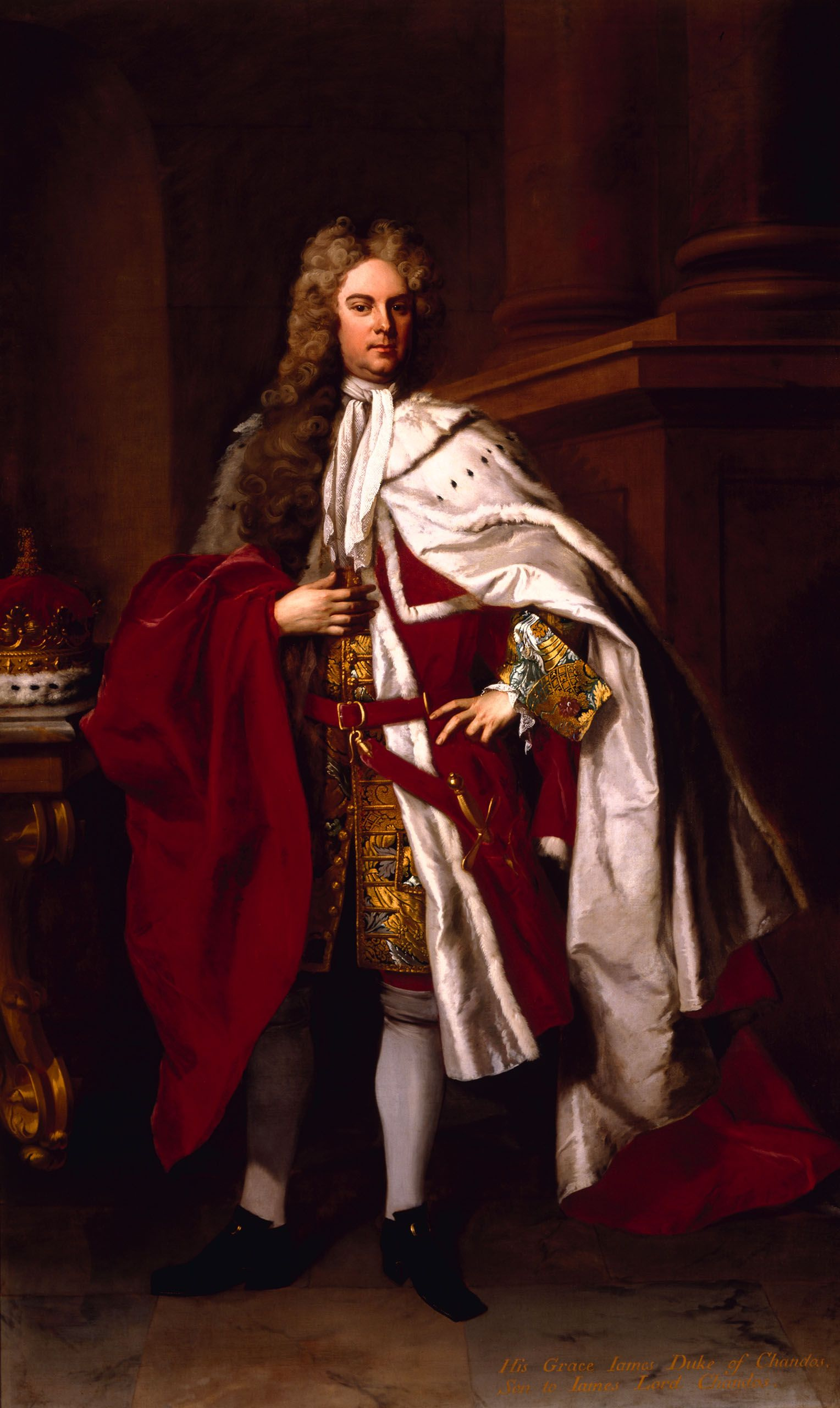
A portrait of James Brydges, 1st Duke of Chandos by Michael Dahl

Handel, born in 1685 in what is now Germany, had spent several years as a young composer in Italy. From 1712 he was resident in London and was mostly focused on composing Italian operas. In 1717 he joined the household of James Brydges, later 1st Duke of Chandos, at his palatial estate, Cannons, in Little Stanmore, as composer in residence. Handel was already a celebrated composer throughout much of Europe and as his first biographer, John Mainwaring, wrote in 1760 "the having of such a composer was an instance of real magnificence such as no private person or subject: nay, such as no prince or potentate on the earth could at that time pretend to." Brydges maintained a number of other composers as well as a small orchestra and an ensemble of singers and part of Handel's duties was to provide music for worship services held in Brydge's private chapel at the nearby church of St. Lawrence, Whitchurch.

== Features of the work ==
This anthem is very unusual in being written for a small choir of soprano, tenor and bass, omitting the usual altos, and two violins, two oboes playing in unison, and basso continuo instruments of cello, bassoon, and double bass, omitting the usual violas. The omission of the usual inner parts gives the music a light texture similar to chamber music. Handel, as often throughout his career, recycled music in this anthem that he had already used in other compositions, notably in this instance the Utrecht Te Deum and Jubilate, originally composed for a grand service of thanksgiving in St. Paul's Cathedral.

== Text and structure ==
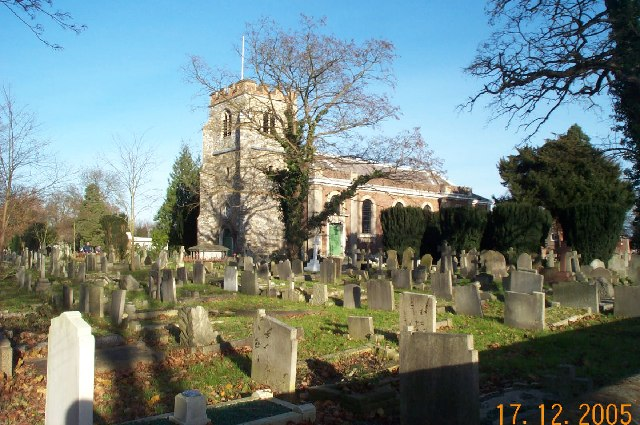
Little Stanmore, Church of St Lawrence, where the Chandos Anthems were first performed

The anthem is a setting of Psalm 100, known as the "Jubilate".

Opening instrumental sonata in the form of a French overture, leading without a pause into:
Tenor solo, then fugal chorus :

Oh be joyful in the Lord, all ye lands,
Serve the Lord with gladness
And come before his presence with a song.

Duet for soprano and bass, with solo violin and solo oboe:

Be sure that the Lord, he is God,
It is He that has made us, and not we ourselves.
We are His people, and the sheep of His pasture.

Polyphonic chorus:

O go your ways into His gates with thanksgiving
And into His courts with praise
Be thankful unto Him, and speak good of His name.

Trio, soprano, tenor and bass:

For the Lord is gracious, His mercy is everlasting
And His truth endures from generation to generation.

Chorus, in block chords:

Glory be to the Father, and to the Son, and to the Holy Ghost

Fugal chorus:

As it was in the beginning, is now, and ever shall be,
World without end,
Amen.

== Selected recording ==
Ian Partridge (Tenor), Lynne Dawson (Soprano), Michael George (Bass), The Sixteen, The Sixteen Orchestra, Harry Christophers (Conductor). CD: Chandos records. Cat # 554. Released 1994.
