= Chandos Anthems =

Set of anthems by George Frideric Handel

- by George Frideric Handel
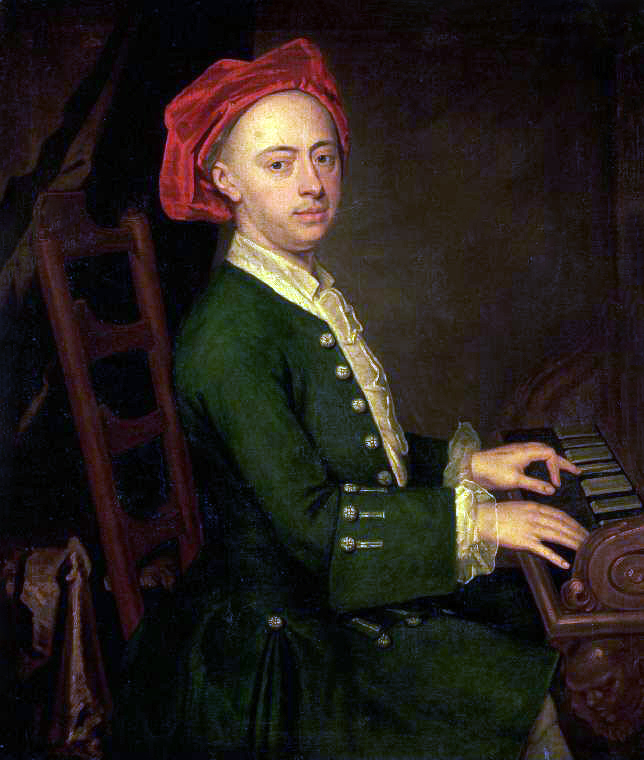
- The Chandos Portrait of Handel
- Other name: Anthems for Cannons
- Catalogue: HWV 246–256
- Year: 1717–18
- Period: Baroque
- Genre: Sacred choral music
- Text: Psalms
- Language: English
- Vocal: STB choir
- Instrumental: Oboe; 2 violins; continuo

Chandos Anthems, HWV 246–256, is the common name of a set of anthems written by George Frideric Handel. These sacred choral compositions number eleven; a twelfth of disputed authorship is not considered here. The texts are psalms and combined psalm verses in English. Handel wrote the anthems as composer in residence at Cannons, the court of James Brydges, who became the First Duke of Chandos in 1719. His chapel was not yet finished, and services were therefore held at St Lawrence in Whitchurch. The scoring is intimate, in keeping with the possibilities there. Some of the anthems rely on earlier works, and some were later revised for other purposes.

The first anthem was published in 1783, others followed in 1784. With a leading Jubilate, an additional closing anthem in different scoring, and in different order, they were published in the Samuel Arnold edition of Handel's works. In the Hallische Händel-Ausgabe, anthems 1 to 11 are titled Anthems for Cannons. Carus-Verlag published an edition in 2009, calling them Cannons Anthems.

== History ==
In 1717, Handel became composer in residence at Cannons in Middlesex, seat of James Brydges, Earl of Carnarvon, who in 1719 became the First Duke of Chandos. Johann Christoph Pepusch was Master of Music, having taken up his post before Handel's arrival.

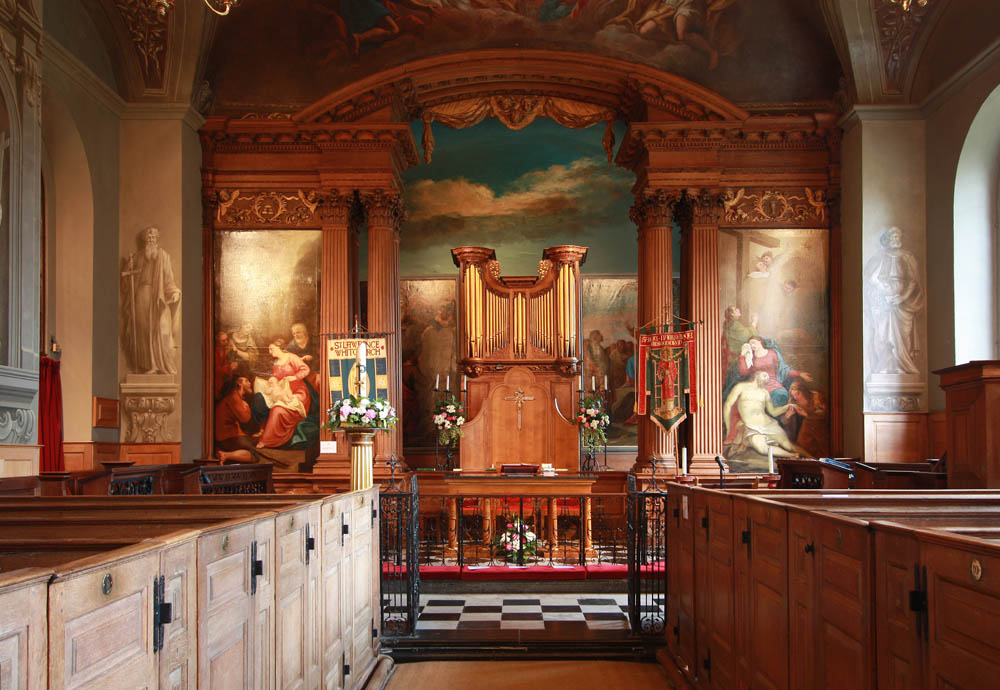
The interior of St Lawrence's Church

During his stay, Handel composed anthems which became known as the Chandos Anthems, for use in Anglican church services. Brydges had a chapel built, but it was still under construction when Handel composed the pieces, and was completed in 1720. Therefore, the court services were held at the parish church St Lawrence in Whitchurch. The church was remodeled to the Earl's baroque taste, finished in 1716. It contains artwork by Louis Laguerre and Antonio Bellucci. The organ used by Handel is at its east end. The organ was modified over the years, but it was restored in 1994, using the surviving parts of the original 1716 single-manual instrument as a reference.

Handel probably selected and compiled the texts himself, drawing from both the Book of Common Prayer (BCP) and from a metrical version of the psalms by Nahum Tate and Nicholas Brady, published as New Version of the Psalms (NVP) in 1696. Handel used three types of selection, on top of setting a complete psalm, firstly a shortened psalm, secondly a shortened psalm with an added verse from a different psalm, and often, most advanced, a compilation of verses from several different psalms. Setting a psalm completely was familiar to him from older models, and he used it in his own settings of psalms in Latin in 1707, and in No. 1, setting the complete Psalm 100. He used the first method in setting Psalm 51, for example, in No. 3. Handel perhaps composed the anthems in pairs, sometimes reusing older material.

Ten of the anthems were published in 1784, today's numbers 2 to 11, in different order. No. 1, the Chandos Jubilate, was left out, possibly because the Utrecht Jubilate was published earlier. In the Samuel Arnold edition of Handel's works, there were twelve anthems, one in two versions, and a No. 12 added, O praise the Lord, ye angels of his. It is debated if this work was composed by Handel. Friedrich Chrysander's edition of Handel's works names these anthems simply Psalmen, and in the Hallische Händel-Ausgabe by Bärenreiter, they are titled Anthems for Cannons. Carus-Verlag published an edition of the individual anthems in 2009, calling them Cannons Anthems.

== Scoring ==
The scoring of the anthems adjusts to the musicians available at the church, resulting, with only few exceptions, in a three-part choir of soprano, tenor and bass, and similarly an orchestra without violas, with oboes playing in unison, two violins and basso continuo. The light texture gives the music the character of chamber music. Handel reused material in some of the anthems that he had composed before, such as Utrecht Jubilate, which had been performed in a thanksgiving service for the Peace of Utrecht at St. Paul's Cathedral.

=== Anthems ===
| No. | HWV | Title | Notes | Text |
|---|---|---|---|---|
| 1 | 246 | O be joyful in the LORD | Chandos Jubilate or Cannons Jubilate in D major | Psalm 100 (Jubilate) |
| 2 | 247 | In the LORD put I my trust | Transcribed for orchestra by Edward Elgar in 1923 as the Overture in D minor, and by Stokowski in 1924 | Psalms 9, 11, 12, & 13 (NVP) |
| 3 | 248 | Have mercy upon me | | Psalm 51 (Miserere). |
| 4 | 249b | O come, let us sing unto the LORD | Partly based on "O sing unto the LORD a new song" (HWV 249a). The overture was later reused in Handel's oboe concerto No. 2 | Psalms 93 & 96 (BCP) |
| 5 | 250a | I will magnify thee | Two movements added later. The overture was later reused in Handel's oboe concerto No. 2 | Psalms 144 & 145 |
| 6 | 251b | As pants the hart | Believed to be one of the first Chandos Anthems composed, orchestrated version of HWV 251a | Psalm 42 |
| 7 | 252 | My song shall be alway | Partly derived from the "Te Deum in D" (HWV 280) | Psalm 89 |
| 8 | 253 | O come, let us sing unto the LORD | | Psalms 95 (Venite), 96, 97, 99, 103 (BCP) |
| 9 | 254 | O praise the LORD with one consent | | Psalms 117, 135, 148 (NVP) |
| 10 | 255 | The LORD is my light | | Psalms 18, 20, 27, 28, 29, 30, 34, 45 |
| 11 | 256a | Let God arise | First movement of symphony added later | Psalms 68 & 76 |

Many movements rely on earlier music, and several were later expanded in new context.

== Legacy ==
Romain Rolland wrote that these anthems (or Psalms) stood, in relation to Handel's oratorios, much the same way that the Italian cantatas stood to his operas: "splendid sketches of the more monumental works". John A. Davis wrote that they contain "almost every type and style of Handel's music", and thus "present a rather comprehensive panorama of the composer's creative output".

== Recordings ==
Eleven Chandos Anthems were recorded in 1987-89 by The Sixteen, conducted by Harry Christophers.

The Chandos Anthems are sometimes sung by larger forces than Handel intended, as for example in a well-received recording of three of the anthems in 2009 by the Choir of Trinity College, Cambridge. The choir, directed by Stephen Layton, has 40 members.
