= Handel at Cannons =

Period in the life of G. F. Handel

George Frideric Handel was the house composer at Cannons from August 1717 until February 1719. The Chandos Anthems and other important works by Handel were conceived, written or first performed at Cannons.

Cannons was a large house in Middlesex, the seat of James Brydges, 1st Duke of Chandos who was a patron of Handel. The duke, a flute player, had a private orchestra, consisting of 24 instrumentalists. Johann Christoph Pepusch was the Master of Music at Cannons from 1716 and he saw the size of the musical establishment at first expand and then decline in the 1720s in response to Brydges' losses in the South Sea Bubble, a financial crash which took place in 1720.

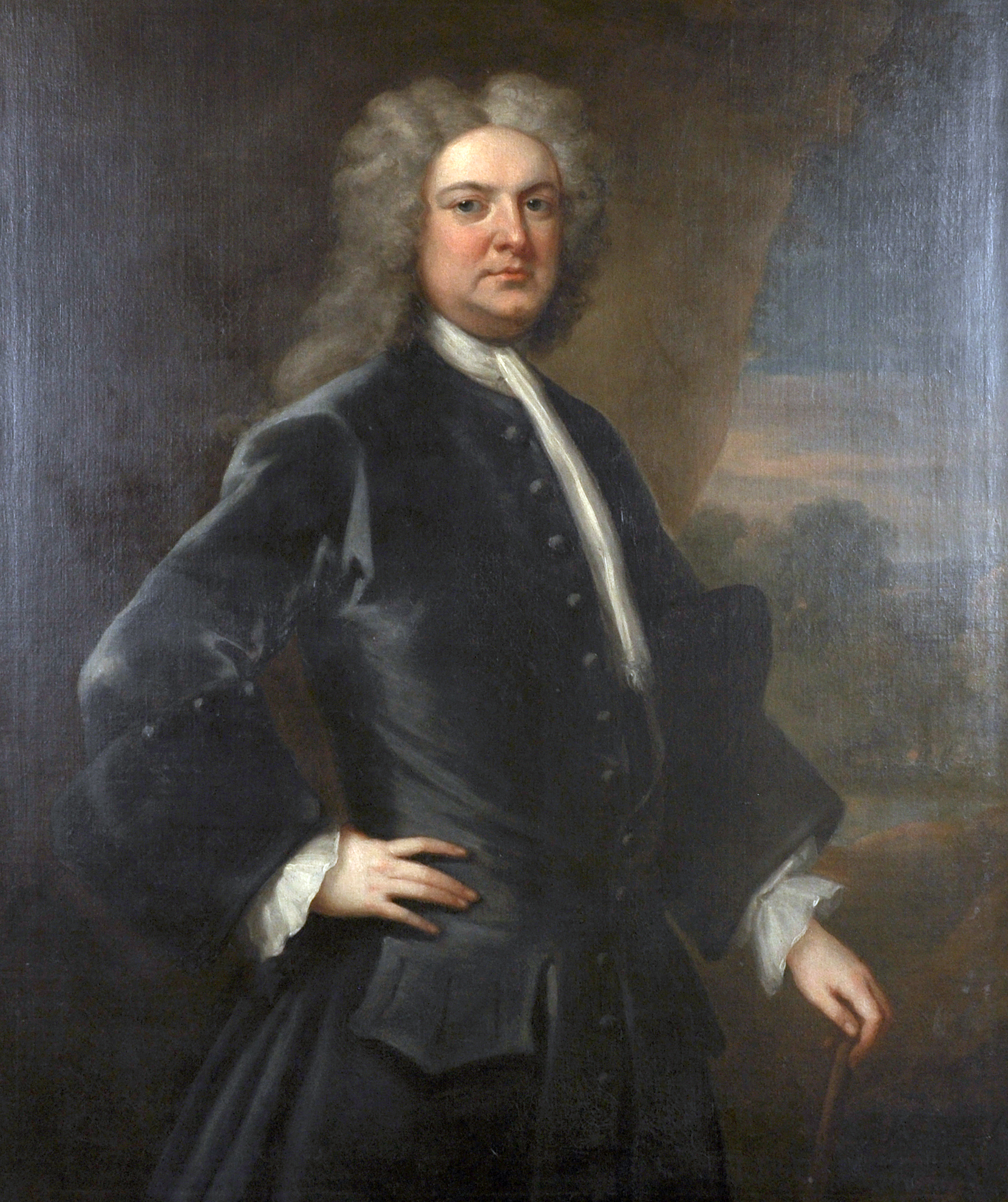
James Brydges, 1st Duke of Chandos (1673-1744), Handel's patron at Cannons, painted by John Vanderbank in 1722.

== Handel's move to Cannons ==
Handel settled in England in 1712, but appears not to have maintained his own household in London until 1723. He attracted the patronage of noblemen such as Richard Boyle, 3rd Earl of Burlington, and he was based at Burlington House before becoming Cannons' resident composer from 1717 to 1718. It has been suggested that the move to Cannons was related to the fact that in 1717 there was reduced demand for his services in central London because operatic productions were experiencing a temporary downturn. At the end of Handel's stay at Cannons, the Duke and his friends helped him establish a new opera company in London, the so-called Royal Academy of Music.

== Church music ==
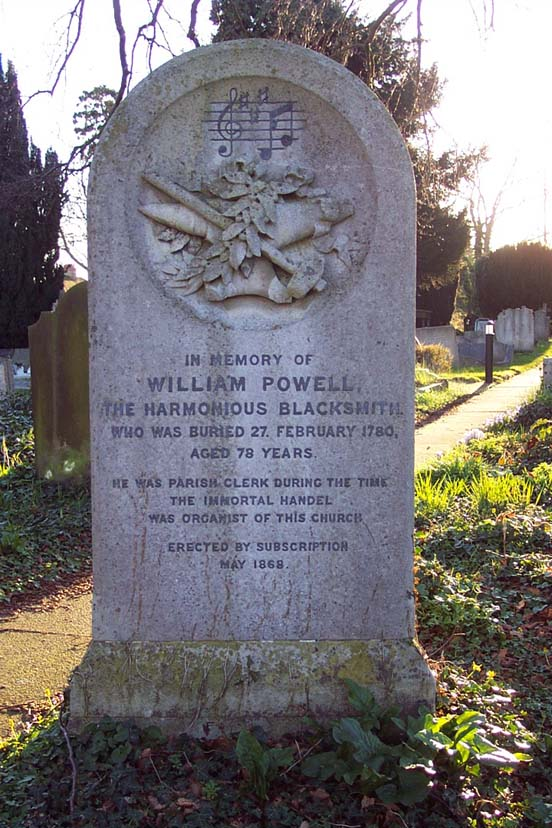
Handel's connection with Cannons is commemorated in this gravestone of questionable accuracy – see The Harmonious Blacksmith

Handel wrote church music for performance at Cannons, the Chandos Te Deum and the Chandos Anthems (settings of texts from the psalms for use in the Anglican liturgy). While Handel was at Cannons, the ducal chapel was still being constructed (it was finished in 1720). The church music was performed at the parish church (St Lawrence, Whitchurch). The church reopened in 1716 after the Duke had reconstructed the building to his baroque taste. St Lawrence still contains artwork by Louis Laguerre and Bellucci (who also worked on the decorative scheme of the house). At the east end of the church is the organ used by Handel. Modernised over the years, it was restored in 1994 using the surviving parts of the original 1716 single-manual organ as the reference point.

== Chandos Anthems ==
The Chandos Anthems were written at a time when the musical establishment at Cannons was still being expanded. The scoring of the anthems varies, with strings predominating including first and second violins (but only occasionally violas), cellos and basses. There is usually a separate part for an oboe, and one for organ. Bassoons occasionally join the cellos and basses.

The number of singers at Handel's disposition is unknown. Although Daniel Defoe referred to the duke having a "full choir" at a slightly later period, it seems that altos were missing from the choir at the start of Handel's tenure at Cannons (see As pants the hart for details of the scoring of one of the earlier anthems).

== Dramatic music ==
Handel's Esther (HWV 50a), which is now recognised as the first English oratorio, was performed by the Cannons musicians as early as 1718. The libretto, based on a tragedy by Jean Racine, was by John Arbuthnot and Alexander Pope, and according to Winton Dean appears to have been given in a semi-staged version although this is not definitively proven in any known document. Handel used several parts of his Brockes Passion in "Esther."

Another premiere in May 1718 is without doubt the masque Acis and Galatea. The libretto was by John Gay, who was to collaborate with Pepusch in "The Beggar's Opera" in 1728. According to tradition, Acis and Galatea was performed in the garden. Appropriately for Cannons, which had expensive water features, the pastoral hero Acis is transformed into a fountain at the end.

== Instrumental music ==
Handel published eight keyboard suites in 1720. It is possible, though unproven, that some of them were written at Cannons. Dating the music is difficult because it was written over a period of years and the composer had been happy to leave it in manuscript until he got wind of a forthcoming unauthorised publication. The Harmonious Blacksmith variations (concluding the 5th suite, in E major) is said to have been written at Cannons.

== See also ==
- As Pants the Hart (Handel)
- The Harmonious Blacksmith
- North London Collegiate School
