= Overture in D minor (Handel, arr. Elgar) =

The Overture in D minor (Handel, arr. Elgar) is a transcription made in 1923 by Sir Edward Elgar of a musical work by George Frideric Handel composed in 1717-18.

The transcription is an arrangement for full orchestra of the overture to Chandos Anthem No. 2 (HWV247) "In the Lord put I my Trust", which Handel wrote when he was resident composer for the Duke of Chandos at Cannons house. Handel also used this music in his concerto grosso in D minor Op. 3 No.5 HWV 316 I. & II.

The conductor Leopold Stokowski also made a transcription of the same overture.

== History ==
The transcription was first performed at the Worcester Festival on 2 September 1923, conducted by the composer. It was recorded a month after the first performance. Elgar's friend W. H. Reed wrote of Elgar's enthusiasm for Handel: '...he would speak of Handel with tears in his eyes... would rub his hands gleefully and look up to heaven at the thought of Handel's genius'. Elgar wrote to John E. West, music editor at Novello & Co., that he had known the overture since he was a little boy and always wanted it to be heard in a large form.

Elgar's arrangement followed his arrangement for small orchestra of Handel’s overture of Ariodante and two orchestrations of works by another composer he admired: he transcribed J. S. Bach's Fugue in C minor in 1921 and the Fantasia in C minor in 1922.

The Overture in D minor was published by Novello & Co. in 1923.

== Instrumentation ==
Handel scored it for a small orchestra with first and second violins, oboe, and basso continuo.

Elgar's arrangement is written for a full symphony orchestra consisting of piccolo, 2 flutes, 2 oboes, cor anglais, 2 clarinets in B♭, bass clarinet, 2 bassoons, contrabassoon, 4 horns in F, 3 trumpets in C, 3 trombones, tuba, 3 timpani, percussion (bass drum, cymbals, side drum), string section, and organ (ad. lib.).
