= The Harmonious Blacksmith =

Composition for harpsichord by George Frideric Handel

Portrait of George Frideric Handel by Balthasar Denner, c. 1726–28

The Harmonious Blacksmith is the popular name of the final movement, Air and variations, of George Frideric Handel's Suite No. 5 in E major, HWV 430, for harpsichord. This instrumental air was one of the first works for harpsichord published by Handel and is made up of four movements. An air is followed by five doubles (variations in the English division style): semiquavers in the right hand; semiquavers in the left hand; semiquaver triplets in the right and left hands; and finally demisemiquavers in both hands.

== Handel's life ==
Around the time of 1720, G. F. Handel had just left his native land of Germany to London, accepting his new position at the Royal Academy of Music. Before that, Handel had already moved to England in 1712, spending his time based at the Burlington House before becoming house composer at Cannons in Middlesex. It has been suggested that the move to Cannons was related to the fact that in 1717 there was reduced demand for his services in central London because operatic productions were experiencing a temporary downturn. At the end of Handel's stay at Cannons, the Duke and his friends helped him establish a new opera company in London, the so-called Royal Academy of Music.

== The eight suites of 1720 ==
The Harmonious Blacksmith (5:00)

Handel published his first eight harpsichord suites in 1720 with the following explanation:

I have been obliged to publish some of the following Lessons, because surrepticious and incorrect Copies of them had got Abroad. I have added several new ones to make the Work more useful, which if it meets with a favourable Reception; I will still proceed to publish more, reckoning it my duty, with my Small Talent, to serve a Nation from which I have receiv'd so Generous a protection

— Handel, preface to the publication of 1720

Among the eight suites published for harpsichord in 1720, Handel published his Suite no. 5 in E major, HWV 430. This suite consists of four movements: The Prelude, Allemande, Courante and Air and Variations; the first three movements having stylised dance rhythms. This suite was promulgated a year after Handel became Master of the Orchestra at the Royal Academy of Music, also known as the first Italian opera company in London. Handel lived the remainder of his life in London after leaving Germany to work as resident composer for Earl of Carnarvon.

== The name ==
There have been a number of explanations proffered as to why this movement was called The Harmonious Blacksmith, and by whom. The name was not given by Handel and was not recorded until early in the 19th century, when the movement became popular on its own (while Handel's music remained popular in England continuously after his death, it was only very selectively known.)

=== An unproven history ===
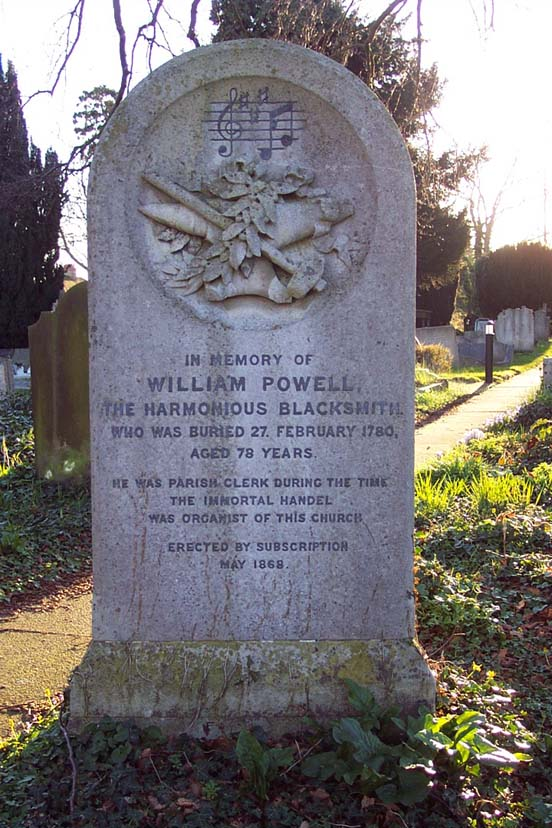
William Powell's infamous grave

The story is that Handel, when working for James Brydges the future Duke of Chandos at Cannons between 1717 and 1718, once took shelter from the rain in a smithy, and was inspired to write his tune upon hearing the hammer on the anvil; the regularly repeated pedal note (B in the right hand) in the first variation, can give the impression of a blacksmith hammering. A variation on the story is that he heard the blacksmith singing the tune which would later become the Air; this explanation fits in nicely with Handel's general technique of borrowing tunes.

The story never appeared in Handel's lifetime and its authenticity is unproven. It is mentioned in a publication called "The Musical Magazine" in 1835. The legend began three-quarters of a century after Handel's death with Richard Clark in his Reminiscences of Handel (1836). Henry Wylde and Richard Clark then found an old anvil in a smithy near Whitchurch, Edgware, and fabricated a story to identify William Powell as the fictitious blacksmith, when, in fact, he had been the parish clerk. They raised a subscription for a wooden memorial to him, and in 1868, the people of Whitchurch subscribed again for a grandiloquent gravestone, still standing. It reads: "In memory of William Powell, the Harmonious Blacksmith, who was buried 27. February 1780, aged 78 years. He was Parish Clerk during the time the immortal Handel was organist of this church. Erected by subscription, May 1868."

Handel had written his harpsichord suites of the 1720 publication before he lived at Cannons, when he was at Adlington Hall in Cheshire, or even earlier still.

=== Another possible history ===
William Lintern was a blacksmith's apprentice from Bath who later took up music and so was The Harmonious Blacksmith. The piece came to be called after him, probably because he published it under that name for reasons outlined in the following extract:

A few months after Clark's publication the writer saw the late J.W. Windsor, Esq., of Bath, a great admirer of Handel and one who knew all his published works. He told the writer that a story of the Blacksmith at Edgware was pure imagination, that the original publisher of Handel's lesson under that name (The Harmonious Blacksmith) was a music seller at Bath, named Lintern, whom he knew personally from buying music at the shop, that he had asked Lintern the reason for this new name, and he had told him that it was a nickname given to himself because, he had been brought up as a blacksmith, although he had afterwards turned to music, and that was the piece he was constantly asked to play. He printed the movement in a detached form, because he could sell a sufficient number of copies to make a profit.

— William Chappell (1809–88), 1889, first edition of Grove's Dictionary of Music

Chappell was a respected musical historian and the story is probably true, but there is no copy of Lintern's edition of the piece in the British Museum, and Mr W. C. Smith, who worked at the museum and was a Handelian specialist of high standing, said that the earliest copy of the piece that he had yet (as of 1940) been able to find under the name The Harmonious Blacksmith was that published by the British Harmonic Institution, arranged as a piano-forte duet, the paper of which bears the watermark '1819'.

== Origins of the music ==
As to the origins of the music, a bourrée by Richard Jones (1680–1740) features almost the same air in a minor key, though it is not known whether Jones preceded Handel or vice versa. A passage in Handel's opera Almira, written in 1704, is very like the Harmonious Blacksmith tune, so it is likely that it was his own.

There also exist several early manuscript versions of this piece, in G major and entitled Chaconne. The overall shape and form of the variations are the same, but the melody as we know it is not yet fully formed, and there are significant improvements to texture and passagework throughout the later published version. Interesting, perhaps, is a complete lack of the insistent repetition of b' (d" through transposition), which has since been commonly associated with the image of a blacksmith striking his anvil.

== Structure ==
The final movement of Handel's Suite No. 5 in E major, HWV 430, consists of the opening theme and five variations, all in E major. "Air and Variations" only modulates from the tonic key to the dominant, with no modal mixture.

=== Theme ===
The theme is in rounded, continuous binary form and is made up of two phrases, with the exposition beginning with the first musical phrase ending on a half cadence and the following phrase ending with a perfect authentic cadence resulting in a parallel period. The music is set in simple meter, with a 4/4 time signature throughout. Moving eighth notes create the foundation for both the right and left hand. Upon completion of the first phrase, the tonic key is reestablished and the right hand begins to play sixteenth notes until a perfect authentic cadence in measure ten, followed by recapitulation of the second phrase. The first measure outlines the tonic and dominant chords, followed in the next measure by a repeat of tonic and dominant chords until the fourth beat, where Handel applies a secondary dominant that leads to a [B major] chord on the first beat of the third measure. This initial motive is repeated in measures three and four, ending the first phrase on a half cadence. The second phrase begins on the tonic chord arpeggiated, followed by a IV chord. This I to IV is repeated until measure five, where the dominant chord is added to the progression, creating a common I, IV, V, I chord progression. This new phrase retains the same chord progression in measures seven and eight, ending the second phrase on a perfect authentic cadence.

=== Variation One ===
Variation one includes the same motivic ideas and adds arpeggiation of the chords with focus on the tonic and dominant key, B major. Both phrases are made up of five measures, with the first ending on a half cadence and the final phrase of the variation ending on a perfect authentic cadence.

=== Variation Two ===
The melody is switched between hands and is now played in the right hand with the left hand arpeggiating the harmonic chordal progression. The left hand plays sixteenth notes throughout this variation and the right hand only plays eighth notes, with the addition of trills in the second phrase. The motivic structure remains the same, with focus on only the tonic and dominant keys.

=== Variation Three ===
The third variation introduces the new musical idea of sixteenth note triplets in the right hand, with the left hand playing the melody in eighth notes. Variation three has the same progression and division of musical sections, but the melody is no longer in the right hand, with the left hand arpeggiating a harmony identical in structure to the theme and both preceding variations.

=== Variation Four ===
The penultimate variation trades the melody to the right hand, with the left hand playing sixteenth note triplets. This variation is almost identical in structure to its predecessor, with the roles of the hands switching.

=== Variation Five ===
The fifth, and final, variation consists of impressive scale work that is played by both hands, with each run of thirty-second notes being returned with another set of thirty-second notes in the following beat, usually played by the opposite hand. The same progression and structural ideas are maintained throughout this variation, ending on a descending E major scale starting on the dominant, resulting in a final perfect authentic cadence.

== Literary mention ==
Pip, the main character in Great Expectations, by Charles Dickens, is fondly given the nickname of Handel by the character Herbert Pocket, in honour of Pip's upbringing as a blacksmith, and in honour of this music: "We are so harmonious- and you have been a blacksmith".

Saint Dunstan is named as the Harmonious Blacksmith in the 18th century poem "The Devil and Saint Dunstan".

The piece is mentioned in Siegfried Sassoon's semi-autobiographical work Memoirs of a Fox Hunting Man. Aunt Evelyn is heard to be playing the piece one evening and the author recalls this happy memory during his time at the Front.

== Musical influence ==
The Italian guitarist-composer Mauro Giuliani used the theme as the basis for his Variazioni su un tema di Handel ("The Harmonious Blacksmith"), Op. 107, for solo guitar in 1828.

The German composer Louis Spohr used the theme as the basis for a variation movement in his Octet in E major, Op. 32.

The theme is referenced at the beginning of the finale of Francis Poulenc's Concert champêtre.

The Australian-born composer and pianist Percy Grainger based one of his most famous works on this melody. He first wrote his Variations on Handel's ‘The Harmonious Blacksmith’ in 1911. Shortly after, he used the first sixteen bars of his set of variations to create one of his most beloved pieces, Handel in the Strand. He wrote that the music “seemed to reflect both Handel and English musical comedy”, hence the title. The composer made various versions of the work, most notably, a piano solo version (1930).

Composer-conductor Igor Markevitch composed Variations, Fugue, and Envoi on a Theme of Handel for piano, based on this melody. Published in 1942 at the age of 30, it was his last published composition.
