= St Lawrence's Church, Whitchurch =

Coordinates: 51.60838°N 0.28931°W

St Lawrence's, Whitchurch
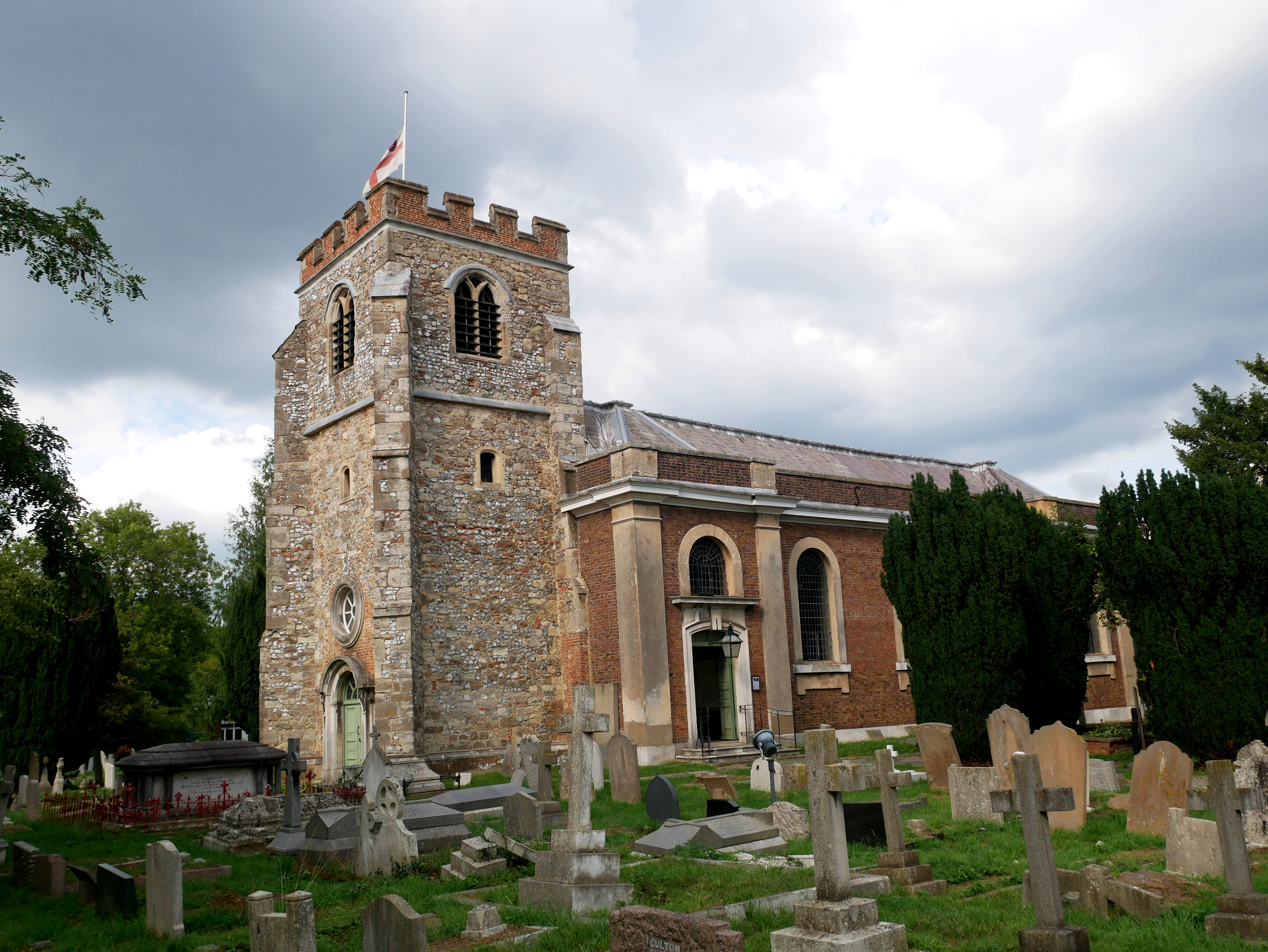
- St Lawrence's in 2022
- St Lawrence's, Whitchurch
- Location: Whitchurch Lane
- Country: England
- Denomination: Church of England
- Website: http://www.littlestanmore.org/

Architecture
- Style: Continental Baroque
- Years built: Tower Circa 1400 Nave reconstructed 1715

Administration
- Province: Canterbury
- Diocese: London
- Archdeaconry: Northolt
- Deanery: Harrow

Clergy
- Archbishop: Justin Welby
- Rector: Fr Paul Reece SSC

St. Lawrence, Whitchurch, is a Church of England parish church in Little Stanmore in the London Borough of Harrow, England. The building is Grade I listed. It retains a stone tower dating from ca. 1360, but the main body of the building was constructed in the 18th century in Baroque style.

== History ==
The original medieval church was reconstructed by the architect John James, working for a wealthy client James Brydges. Brydges, who was later 1st Duke of Chandos, started rebuilding the church and Cannons, his nearby country house, around the time he succeeded his father as ninth Baron Chandos in 1714. Brydges had a habit of changing his architect and in 1715 John James was replaced as architect for the house by James Gibbs, who may have been involved in the completion of the church prior to its reopening in 1716.

Brydges later constructed a private chapel in the house, but he continued to take a personal interest in the church, where he had a gallery for the use of himself and his entourage. He had the right to nominate the vicar, and chose John Theophilus Desaguliers FRS, noted for his achievements in water engineering, who served as his chaplain and engineering consultant.

== Description ==
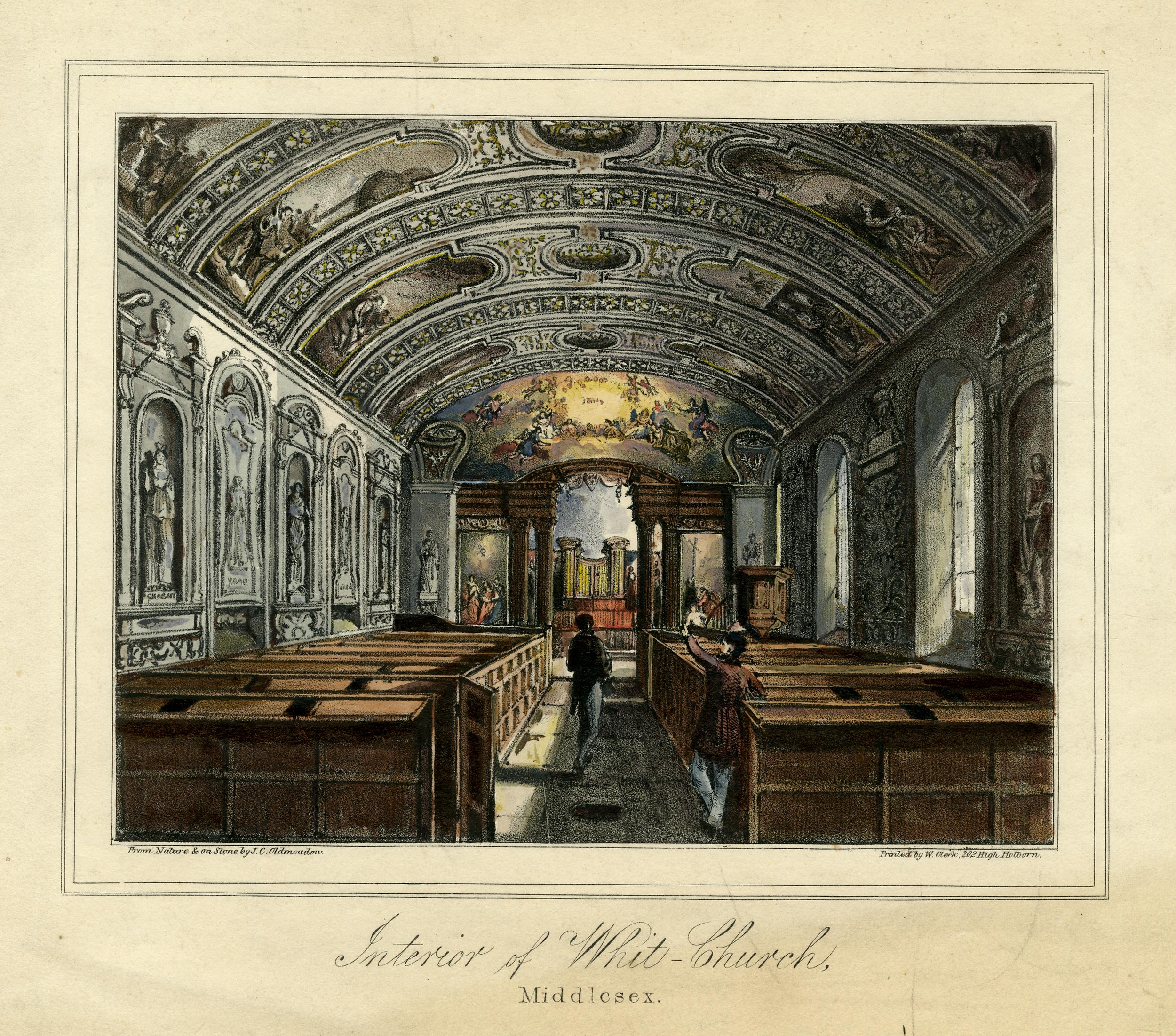
Interior of Whit-Church, circa 1840

The highly decorated interior of the church is unusual in England, Continental Baroque rather than English Baroque in style.

=== Decoration ===
The decorative painter Louis Laguerre and other painters worked on both the church and the house.

== The Chandos Mausoleum ==
Towards the end of his life Brydges had lost much of his wealth, but in 1735 he had a mausoleum, designed by Gibbs in a European Baroque manner, attached to the East end of the church. Burials here include the 1st Duke of Chandos and his namesake James Brydges, 3rd Duke of Chandos.

The centrepiece, documented by Grinling Gibbons, 1717, is a Baroque monument to the first duke and his first two wives. Prior to the construction of the mausoleum, this monument was located in the church. Like the church itself, the mausoleum is remarkable for wall-paintings, in this case by Gaetano Brunetti.

== The organ and the Handel connection ==
Handel was employed by Brydges in 1717/18 as his composer-in-residence. This resulted in a number of works including the Chandos Anthems (settings of texts from the psalms for use in the Anglican liturgy). The church is believed to be where the Chandos Anthems were first performed.

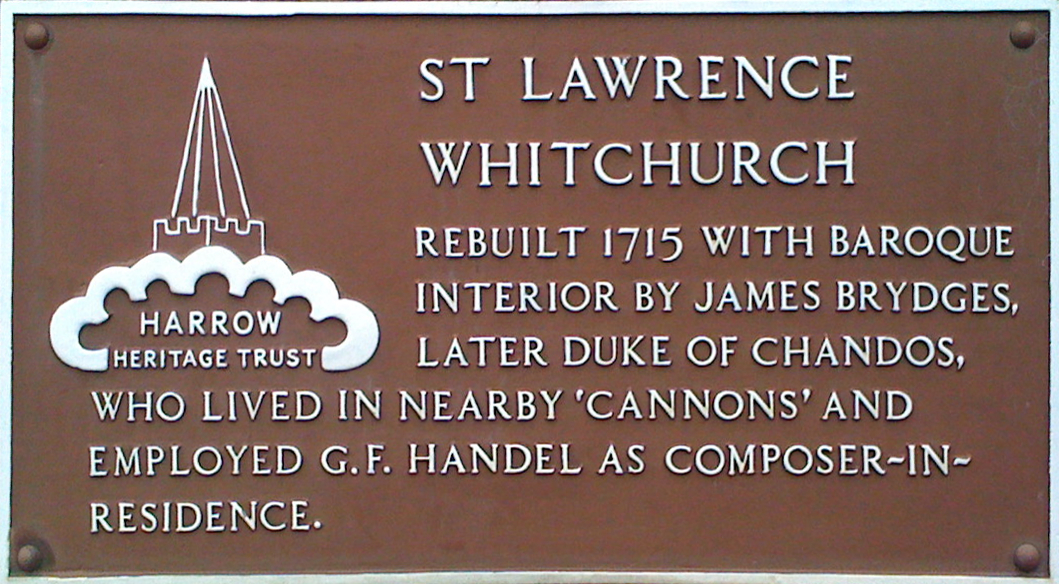
Plaque

At the east end of the church is the organ, which is recognised as a historic instrument by the British Institute of Organ Studies. It is assumed to have been played by Handel. Having been modernised over the years, it was reconstructed in 1994 by Goetze and Gwynn, a firm specialising in pre-Victorian organs. The surviving parts of the original 1716 single-manual instrument were used as the reference point for this reconstruction. The organ is used for recitals as well as services, and has been recorded, for example in Handel's organ concertos. The action (mechanism) is reportedly rather noisy.

Composer William Carter was organist at St Lawrence's Church from 1850 through 1854.

== See also ==
- Canons Park
- Handel at Cannons
