= Louis Laguerre =

French painter

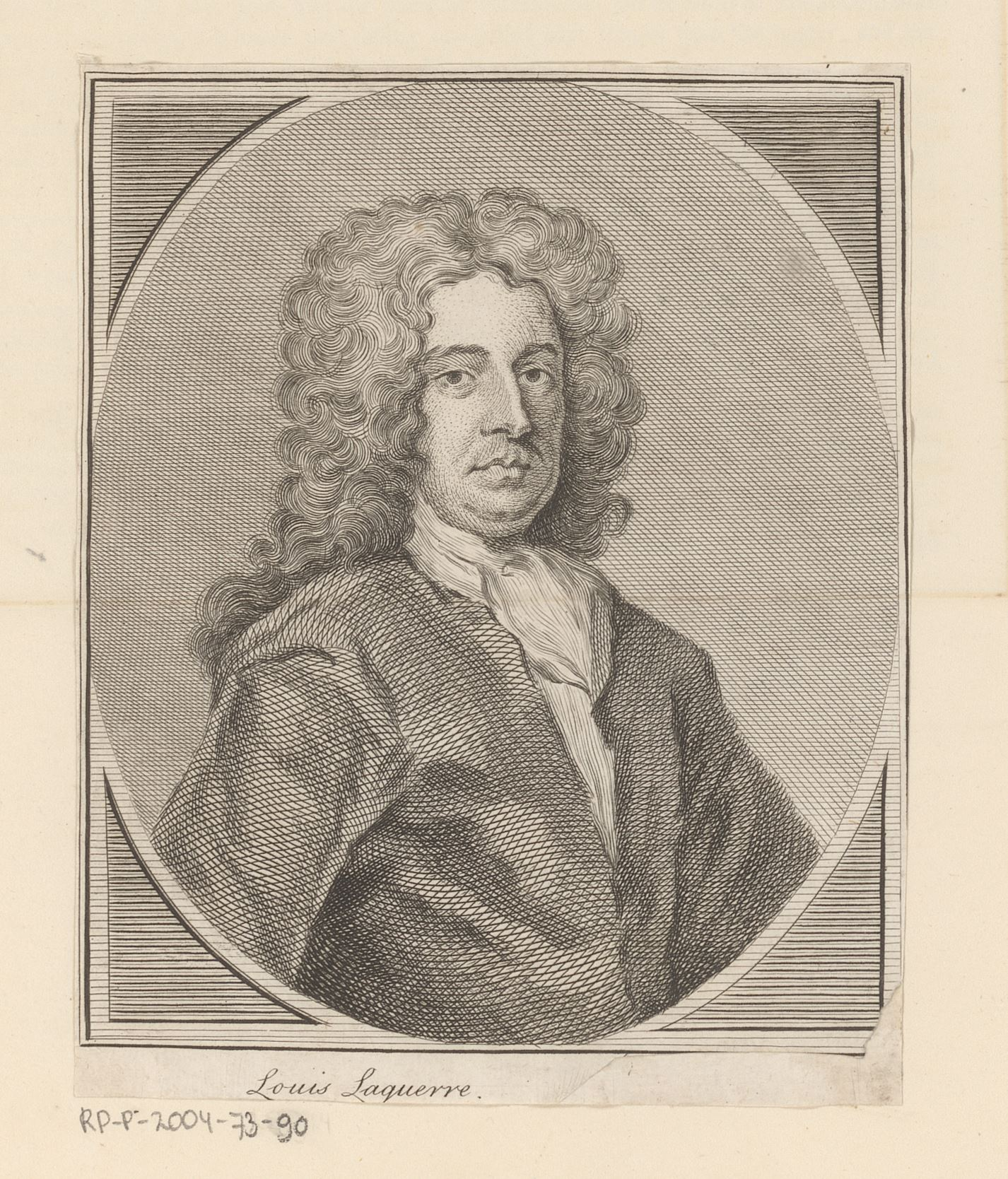
Portrait attributed to Alexander Bannerman

Louis Laguerre (1663 – 20 April 1721) was a French decorative painter who worked mainly in England.

== Biography ==
Born in Versailles in 1663, Laguerre trained at the Académie royale de peinture et de sculpture under Charles Le Brun and came to England in 1683, where he first worked with Antonio Verrio, and then on his own. He rivalled with Sir James Thornhill in the field of history painting, primarily decorating the great houses of the nobility. His wall paintings can be found in Blenheim Palace, Marlborough House, Petworth House, Burghley House, Fetcham Park House and Chatsworth House. In the 1980s, a restoration project revealed work by Laguerre at Frogmore House also. His subject matter included English victories over the armies of Louis XIV; at Hampton Court Palace he carried out work for William III of England, for whom he depicted the Labours of Hercules.

Laguerre painted religious subjects at St Lawrence's Church, Whitchurch, London. In 1731 Alexander Pope wrote,

On painted ceilings you devoutly stare

Where sprawl the saints of Verrio or Laguerre...

which was taken by some contemporaries to be a reference to Laguerre's work for James Brydges, 1st Duke of Chandos at this church and the nearby Cannons House.

Laguerre was also a director of Godfrey Kneller's London Academy of Drawing and Painting, founded in the autumn of 1711. He died in London on 20 April 1721. His father-in-law was Jean Tijou.

== Selected works ==
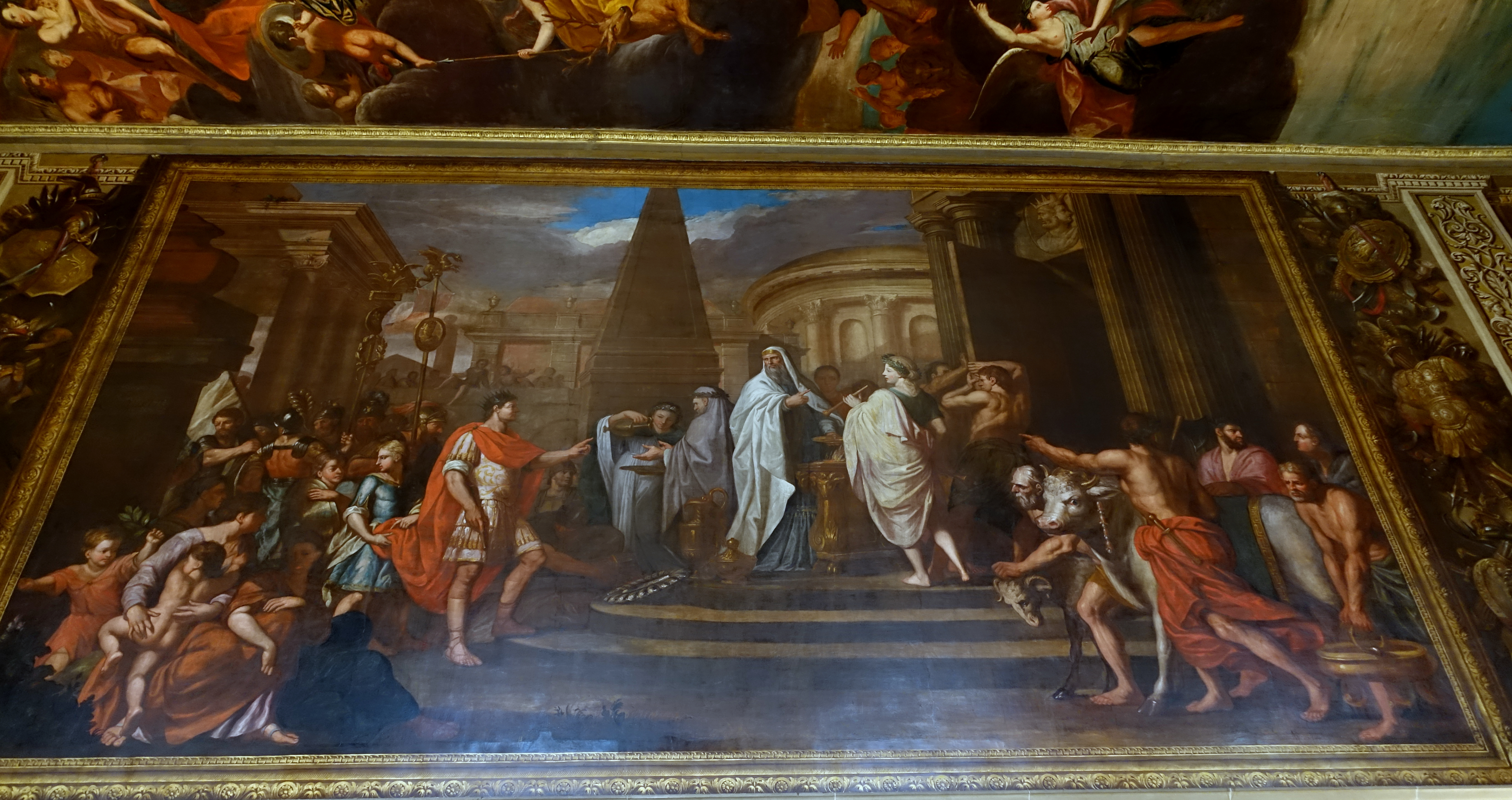
Julius Caesar sacrificing before going to the Senate, 1692-1694, oil on plaster - Painted Hall, Chatsworth House

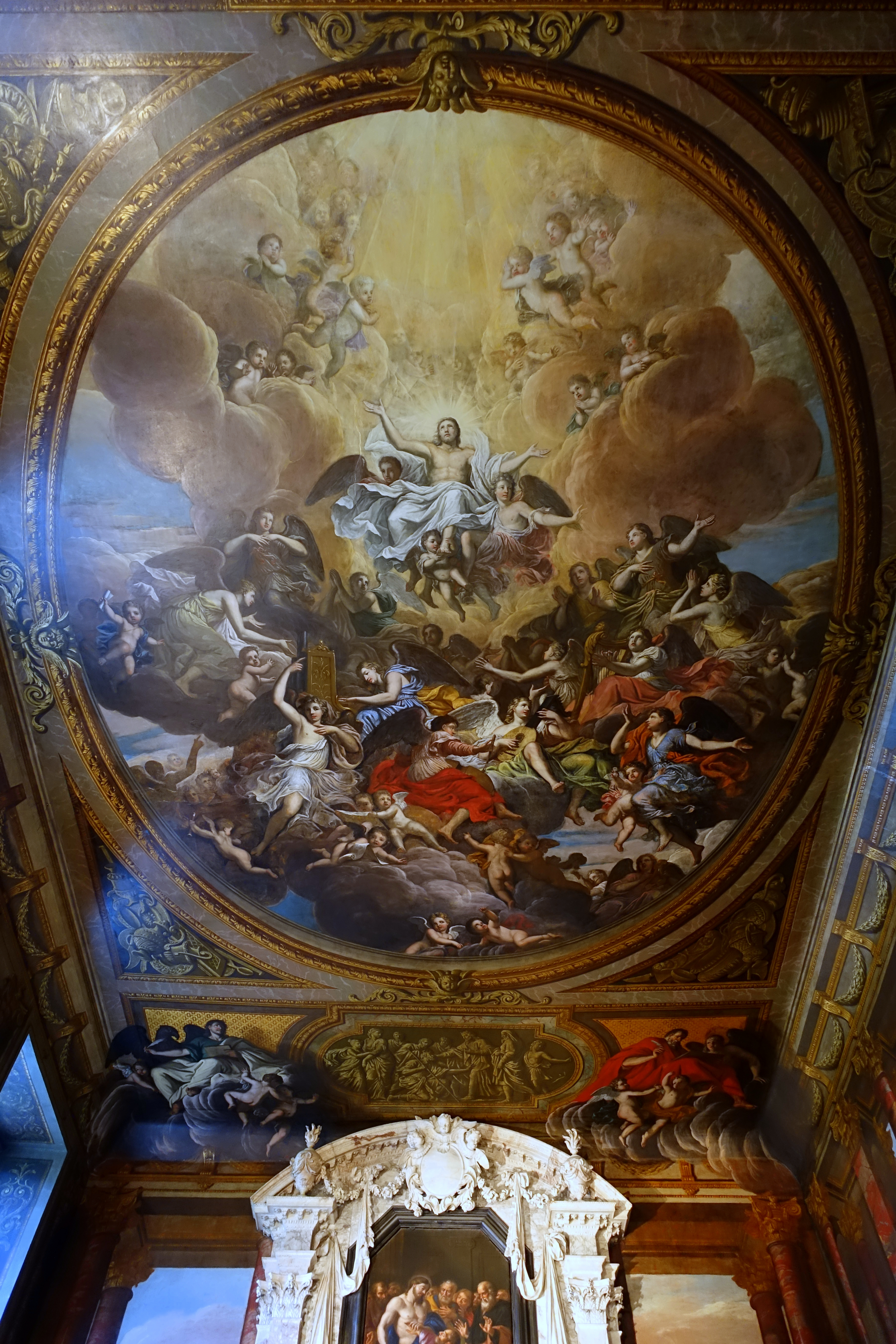
Christ rising into Heaven, c.1688-1693 - Chapel, Chatsworth House

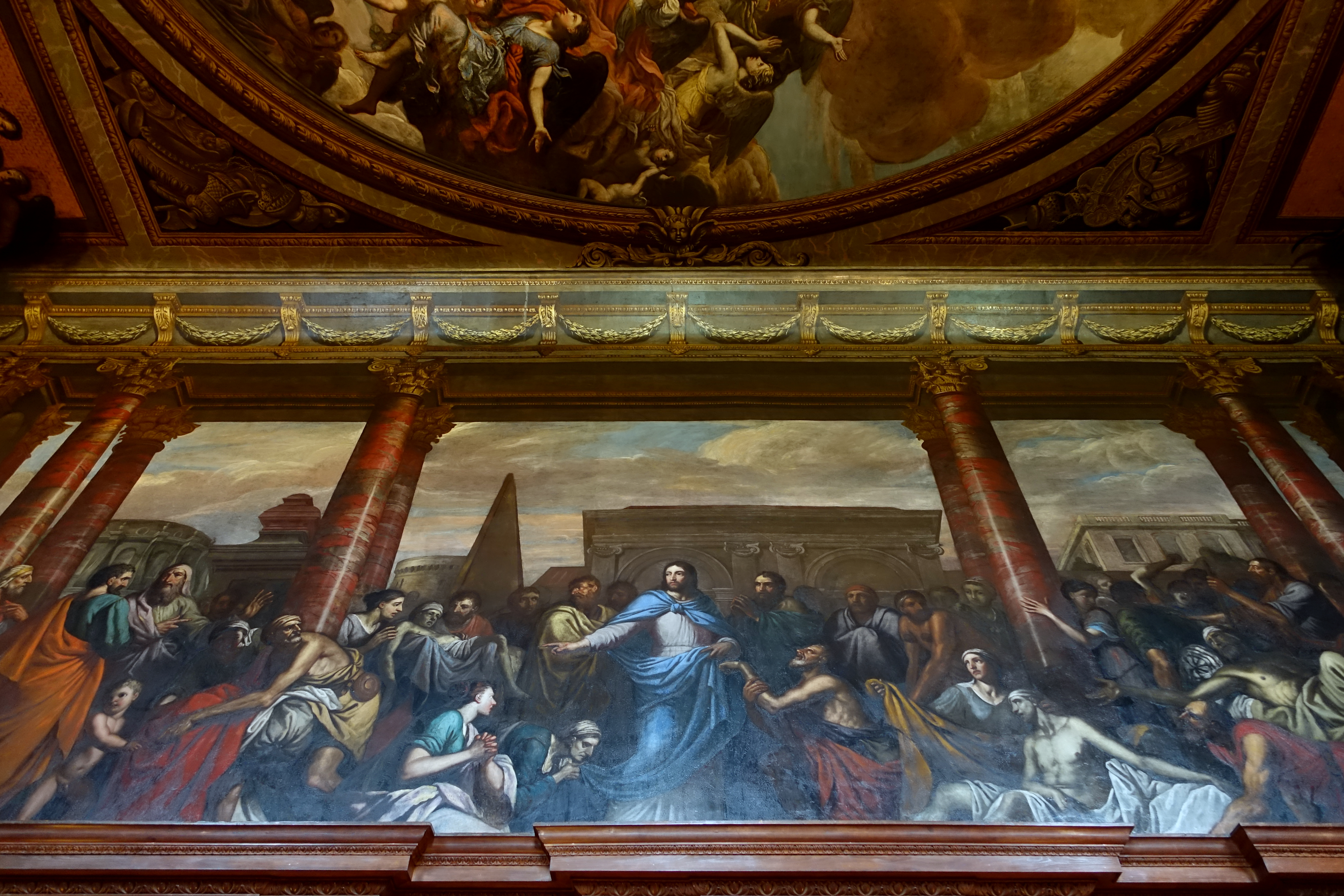
File:Christ healing the Sick, c.1688-1693 - Chapel, Chatsworth House

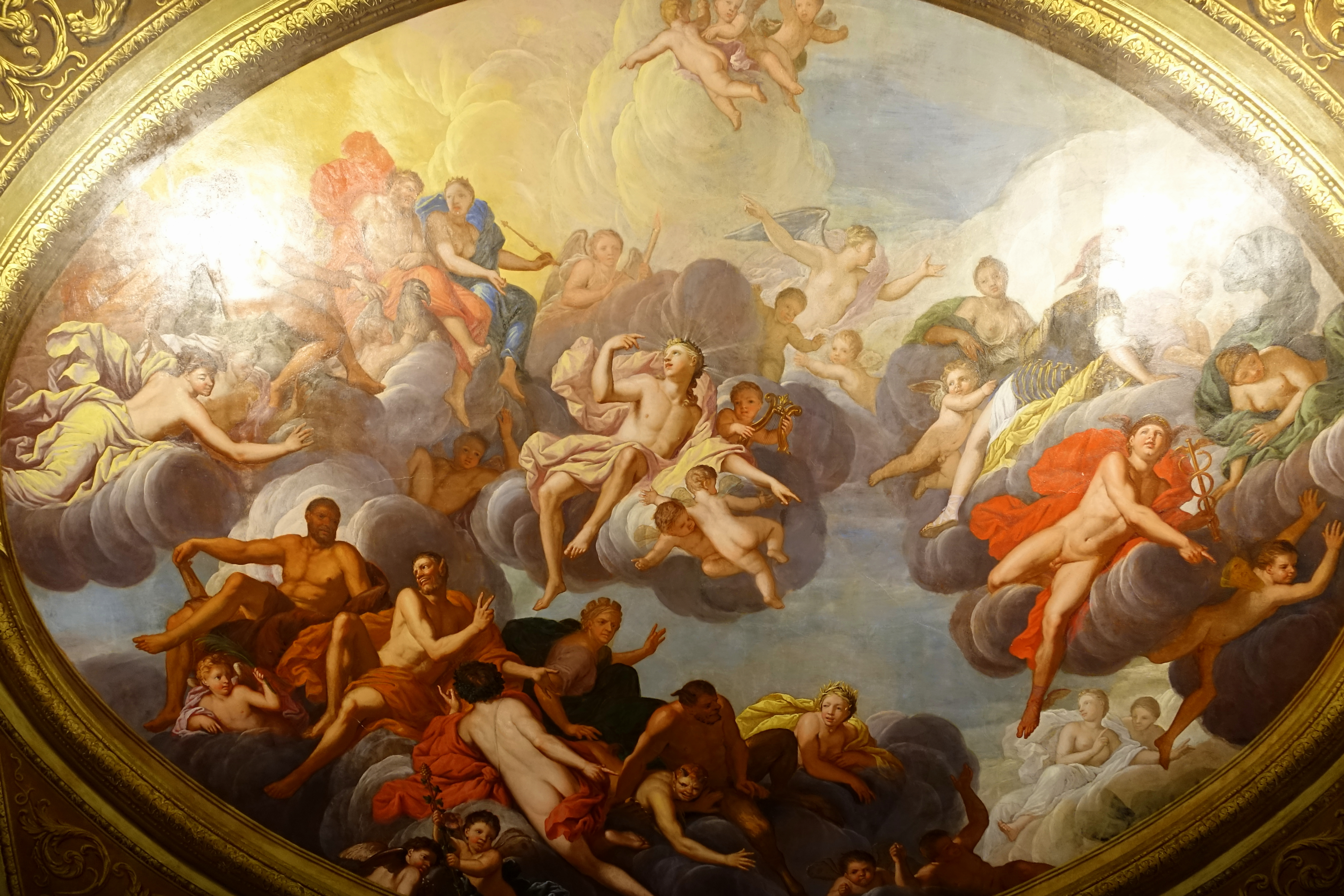
An Assembly of the Gods, c.1688-1693 - State Drawing Room, Chatsworth House

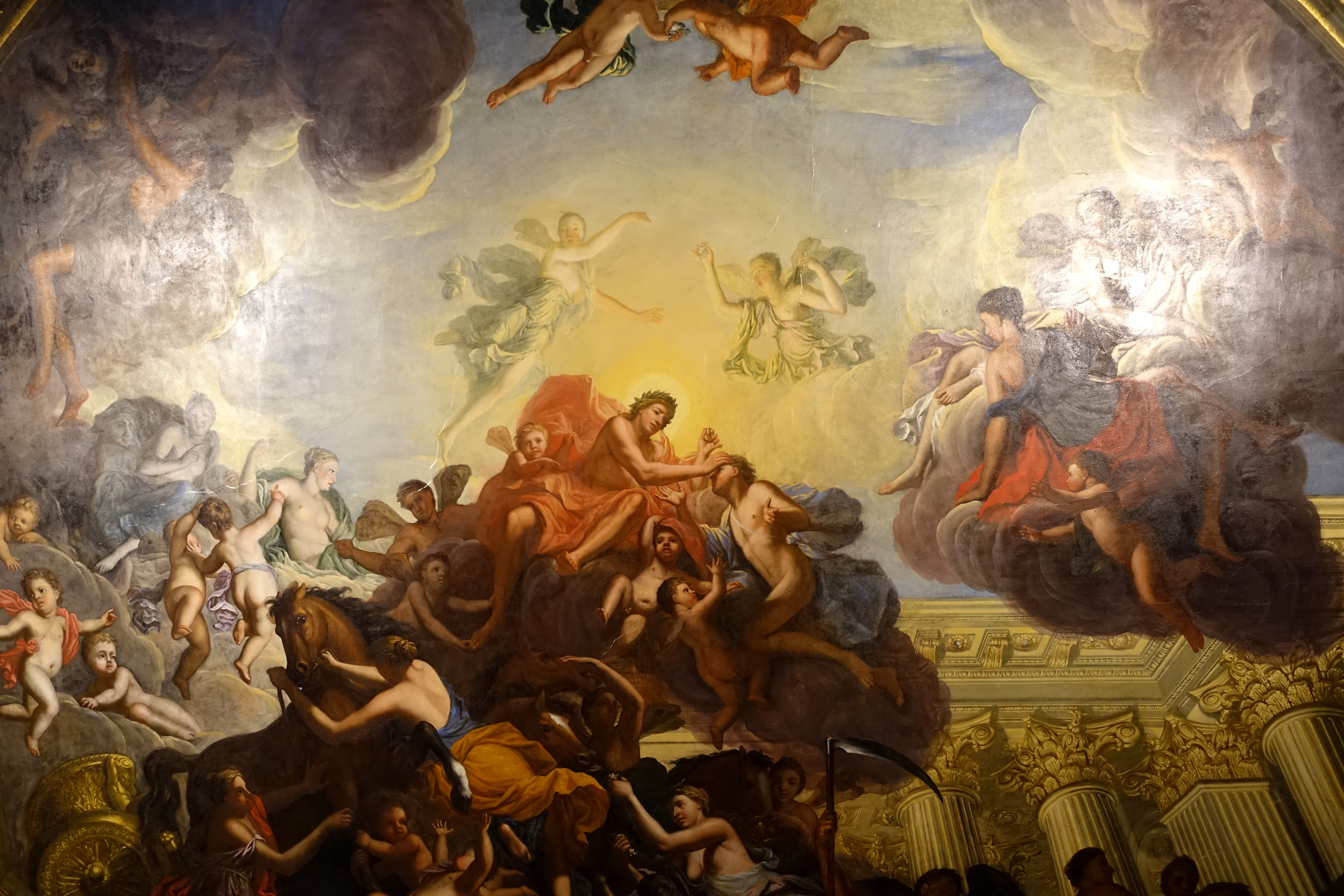
Phaeton and Apollo, c.1688-1693 - State Music Room, Chatsworth House

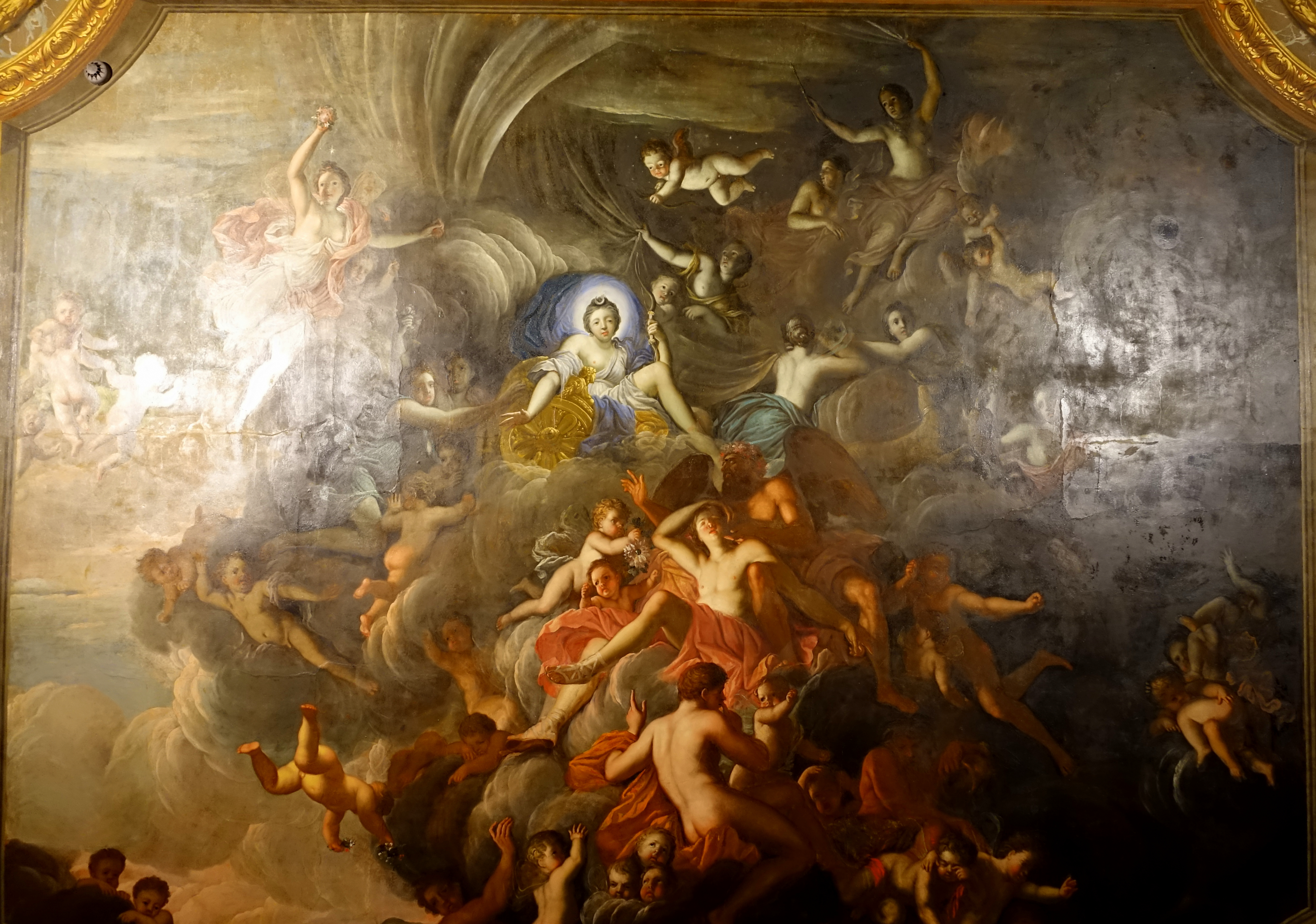
Triumph of Diana, c.1688-1693 - State Bedchamber, Chatsworth House

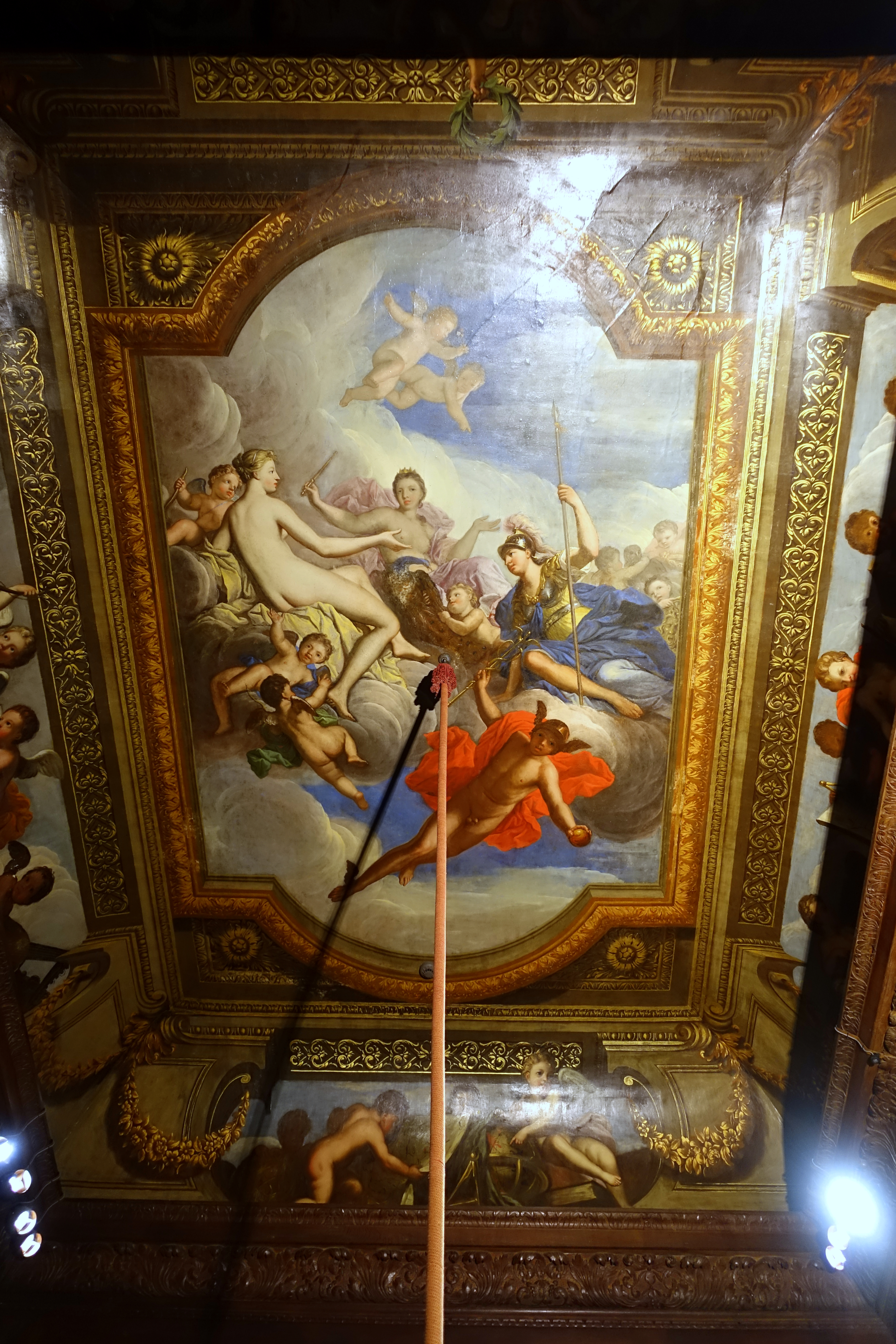
Judgment of Paris (Dispatch of the Apple of Discord), c.1688-1693 - State Closet, Chatsworth House

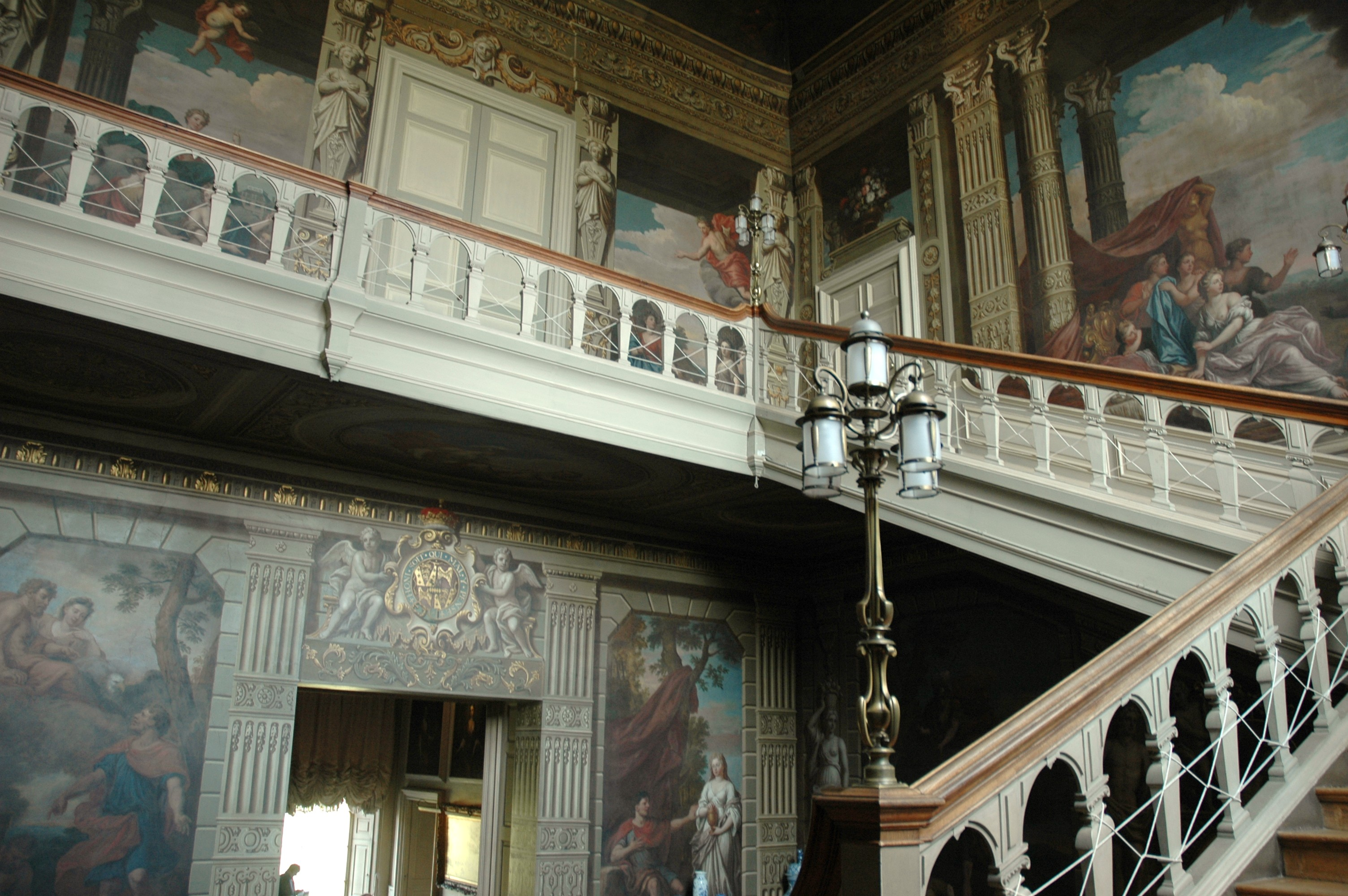
Prometheus and Pandora, 1718–20, The Grand Staircase, Petworth House

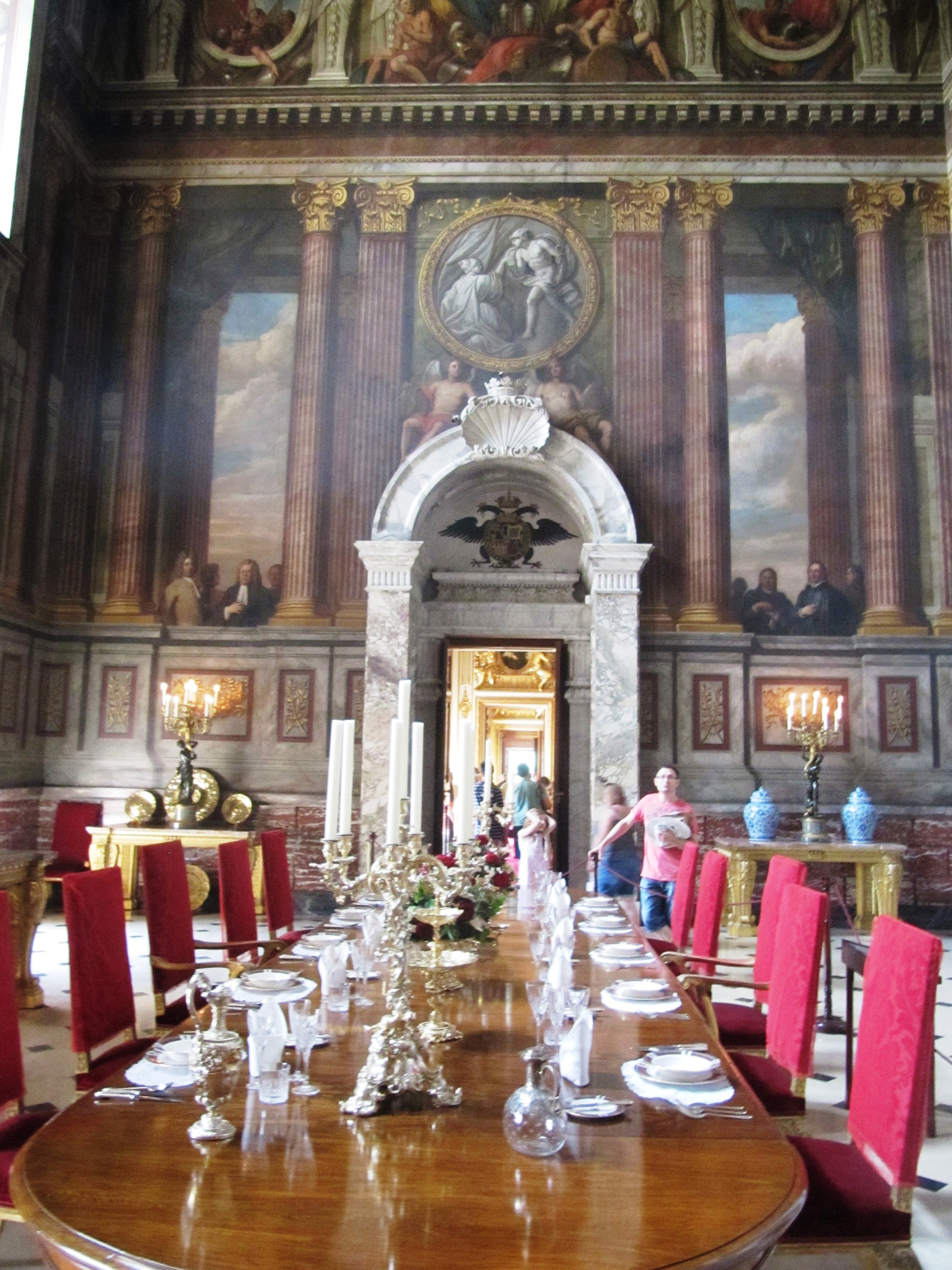
Murals with fictive architecture and portraits, c.1720, Saloon, Blenheim Palace

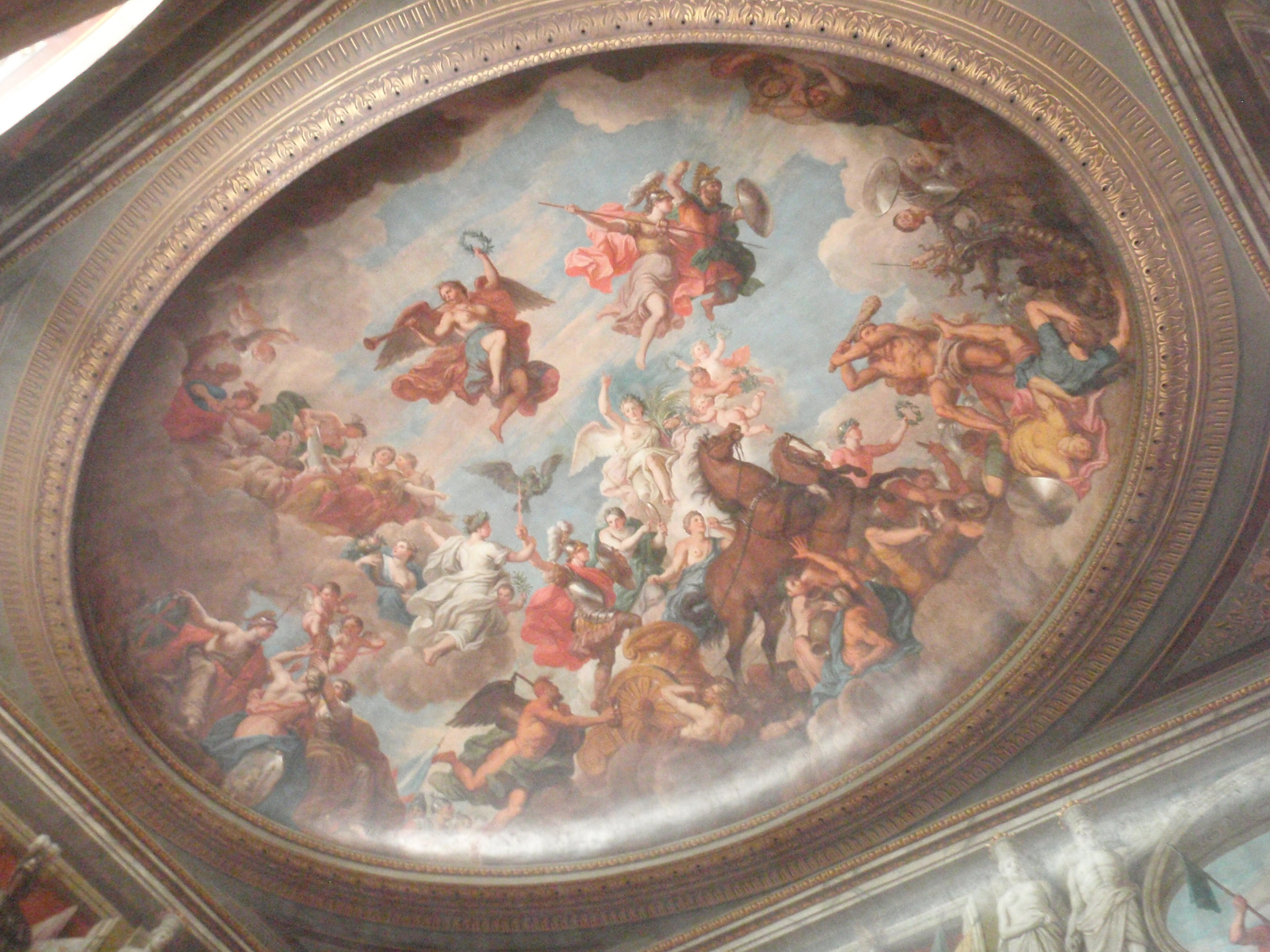
The Triumph of the Duke of Marlborough, c.1720, Saloon ceiling Blenheim Palace

== See also ==
- English school of painting
