= Little Stanmore =

Coordinates: 51.606°N 0.284°W

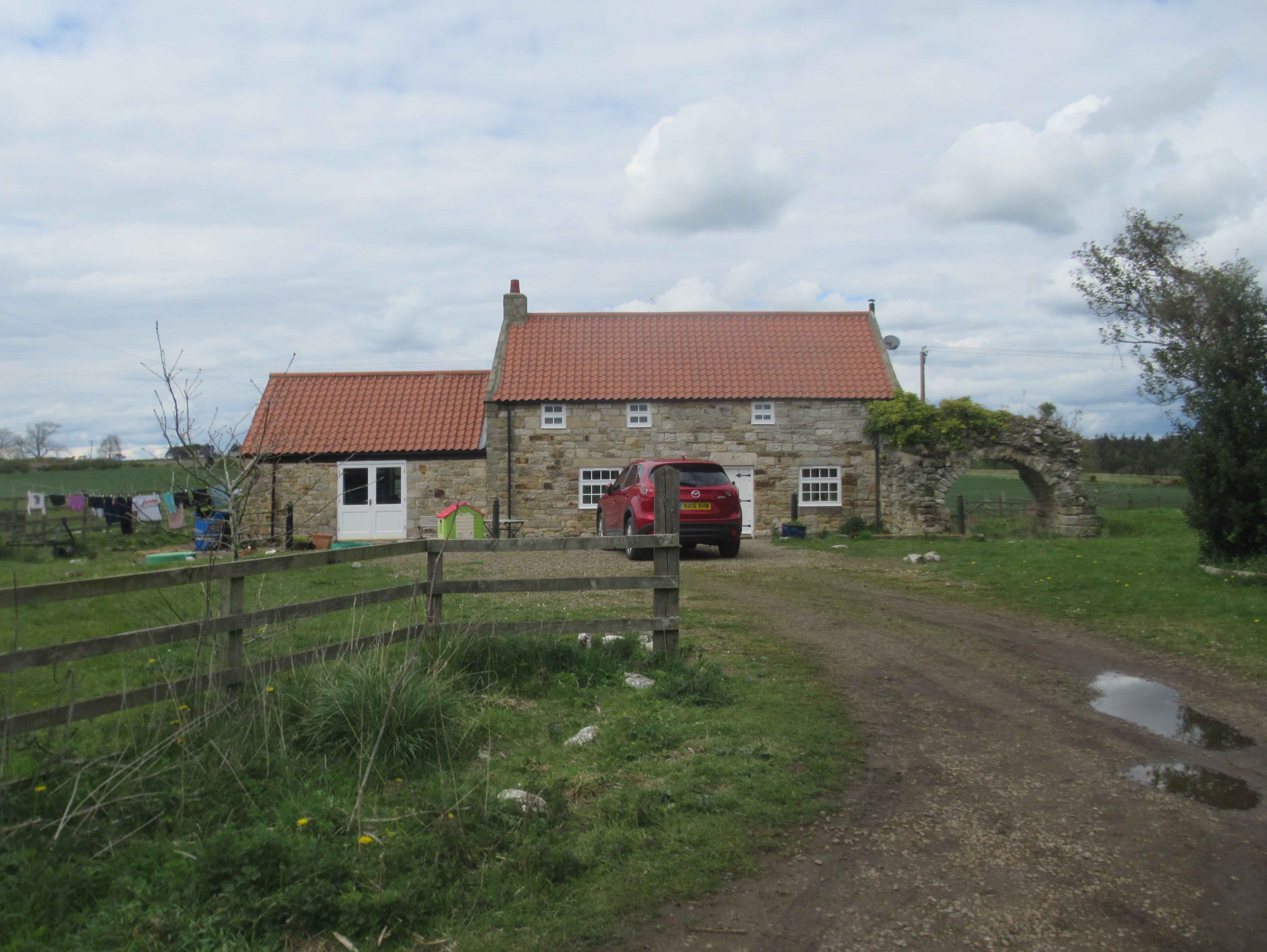
- Newton Underwood Tower

- Location within Greater London
- OS grid reference: TQ189912
- London borough: Harrow
- Ceremonial county: Greater London
- Region: London
- Country: England
- Sovereign state: United Kingdom
- Post town: EDGWARE
- Postcode district: HA8
- Dialling code: 020
- Police: Metropolitan
- Fire: London
- Ambulance: London
- UK Parliament: Harrow East
- London Assembly: Brent and Harrow

Little Stanmore is a residential area of Canons Park in the London Borough of Harrow, England. It was an ancient parish of Middlesex, the parish included the western part of the town of Edgware.

== Toponymy ==
Little Stanmore (parish) population
1881	862
1891	926
1901	1,069
1911	1,761
1921	2,015
1931	6,918
Absorbed by Harrow parish ►
source: UK census

The name 'Stanmore' means "pond made of stone".

Little Stanmore was named to distinguish it from Great Stanmore, which is now known as Stanmore. The parish was also known as Whitchurch. Whitchurch is a common English place-name meaning 'white church', and probably referring to a church built of stone. The name has fallen out of use and is preserved in Whitchurch Gardens and Whitchurch Lane.

== History ==
Little Stanmore formed an ancient parish in the Gore hundred of Middlesex. It included the western part of the town of Edgware.

The parish was grouped for relief of the poor and sanitary provision into Hendon Poor Law Union in 1836 and Hendon rural sanitary district in 1875. The parish became part of Hendon Rural District from 1894, on 1 April 1934 the parish was abolished for form Harrow, part also went to Wembley. As such Little Stanmore became part of Harrow Urban District. The population in 1901 was 1,069 and in 1931 it was 6,918.

== St Lawrence's Church ==
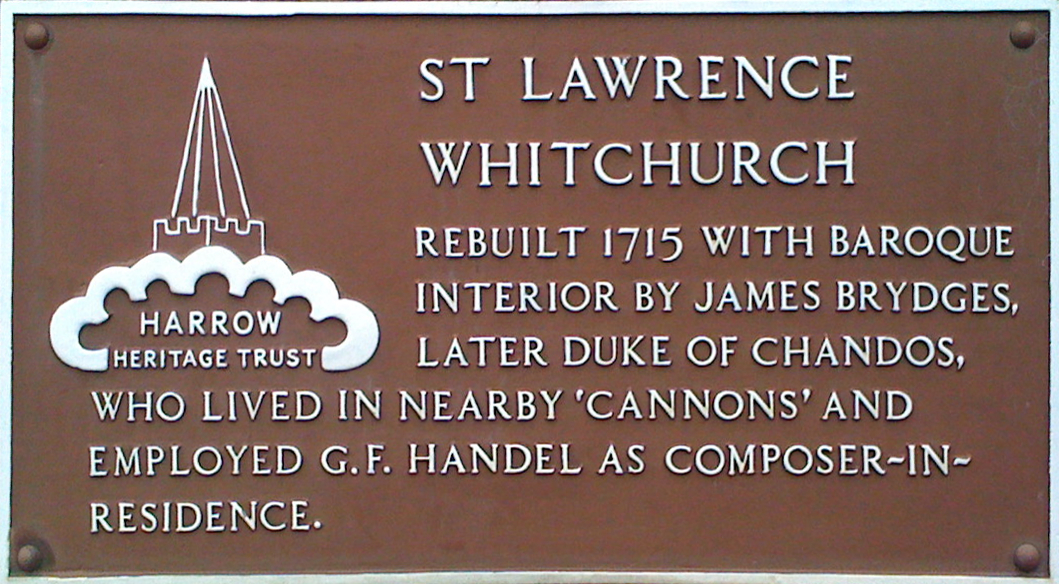

The medieval St Lawrence's Church was reconstructed by James Brydges, 1st Duke of Chandos in the baroque style. The architect was John James, who also worked on the Duke of Chandos' nearby house called Cannons (which was demolished in 1747). It is possible that James Gibbs oversaw the finishing touches to the church when he replaced John James as the Duke's architect in 1715. The interior retains early eighteenth-century paintings by artists such as Louis Laguerre and there is an organ played by Handel and restored in the 1990s to its original condition. In the churchyard is a tombstone to William Powell, supposedly "The Harmonious Blacksmith" who inspired one of Handel's keyboard works. It is also the final resting place of the singer Long John Baldry, (1941 - 2005).
