= Cannons (house) =

Former country house in Middlesex, England

Coordinates: 51.60937°N 0.29216°W

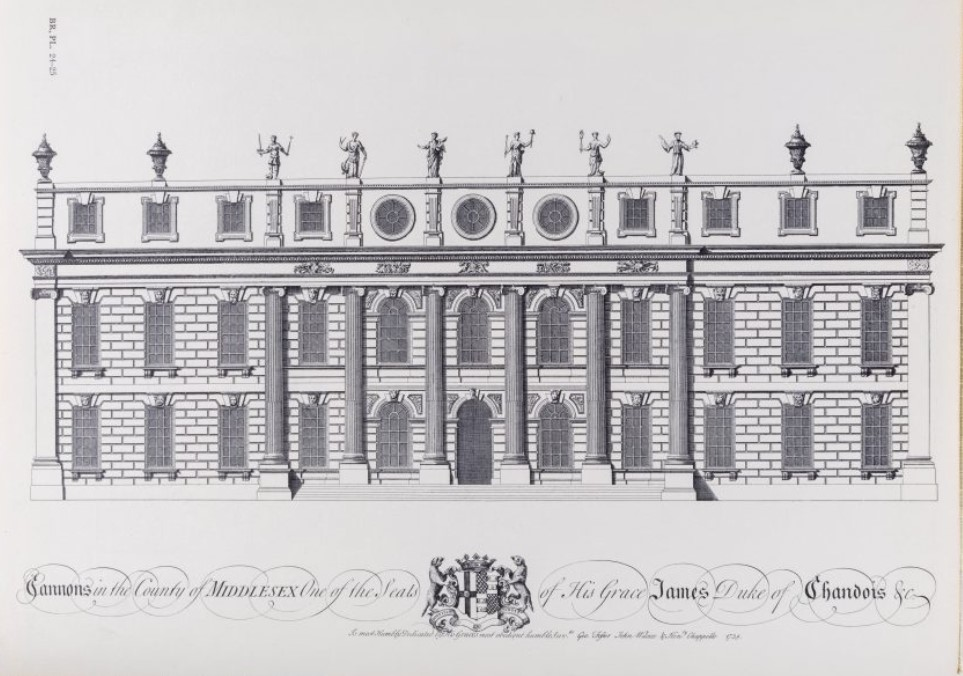
- James Gibb's design for the South Front (from Vitruvius Britannicus)
- Interactive map of the Cannons area

General information
- Architectural style: English Baroque
- Location: Little Stanmore, England
- Construction started: 1713
- Completed: 1724
- Demolished: 1747
- Cost: £200,000
- Client: James Brydges, 1st Duke of Chandos

Technical details
- Structural system: stone

Design and construction
- Architects: William Talman, John James, James Gibbs, John Price and Edward Shepard

Cannons was a stately home in Little Stanmore, Middlesex, England. It was built by James Brydges, 1st Duke of Chandos, between 1713 and 1724 at a cost of £200,000 (equivalent to £39,400,000 today), replacing an earlier house on the site. Chandos' house was razed in 1747 and its contents dispersed.

The name "Cannons" is an obsolete spelling of "canons" and refers to the Augustinian canons of St Bartholomew's Hospital, London, which owned the estate before the English Reformation.

Cannons was the focus of the first Duke's artistic patronage – patronage which led to his nickname "The Apollo of the Arts". Brydges filled Cannons with Old Masters and Grand Tour acquisitions, and also appointed Handel as resident house composer from 1717 to 1718. Such was the fame of Cannons that members of the public flocked to visit the estate in great numbers and Alexander Pope was unjustly accused of having represented the house as "Timon's Villa" in his Epistle of Taste (1731).

The Cannons estate was acquired by Chandos in 1713 from the uncle of his first wife, Mary Lake. Mary's great-grandfather Sir Thomas Lake had acquired the manor of Great Stanmore in 1604. Following the first Duke's death in 1744, Cannons passed to his son Henry Brydges, 2nd Duke of Chandos. Due to the cost of building Cannons and significant losses to the family fortune in the South Sea Bubble there was little liquid capital in Henry's inheritance, so in 1747 he held a twelve-day demolition sale at Cannons which saw both the contents and the very structure of the house itself sold piecemeal leaving little more than a ruin barely thirty years after its inception. The subsequent villa built by William Hallett is now occupied by North London Collegiate School.

== History ==
There is archaeological evidence the site was used in Roman times for brick and tile making.

In mediaeval times the site was a part of the endowment of the Priory of St Bartholomew's which operated St Bartholomew's Hospital in London. This gave it the name Cannons, canon was an archaic term for certain orders of monks including the Augustinians of St Bartholomew's Priory. At the Dissolution of the Monasteries the land was sold into private hands in 1543. A large house was built during the 16th and 17th centuries at one point owned by Thomas Lake, James I's Chancellor of the Exchequer.

James Brydges was an MP for Hereford who achieved the post of Paymaster General to the Forces. He retired in 1713 with a fortune of £600,000, worth £58,000,000 today, he had gained by speculation with the money in his care. Brydges had inherited Cannons from his first wife Mary who died in 1712. In 1713 he married his cousin Cassandra Willoughby and began to enlarge the house. Brydges took personal control of the project and it was the work of a string of architects and landscape gardeners, who changed as they fell into and out of favour. One builder was used throughout, Edward Strong the Elder who had a remarkable pedigree including being the main builder for both St Paul's Cathedral and Blenheim Palace. Brydges used the house as a setting for his patronage of the arts stocking it with paintings, sculpture and holding opera performances. It was completed by 1720.

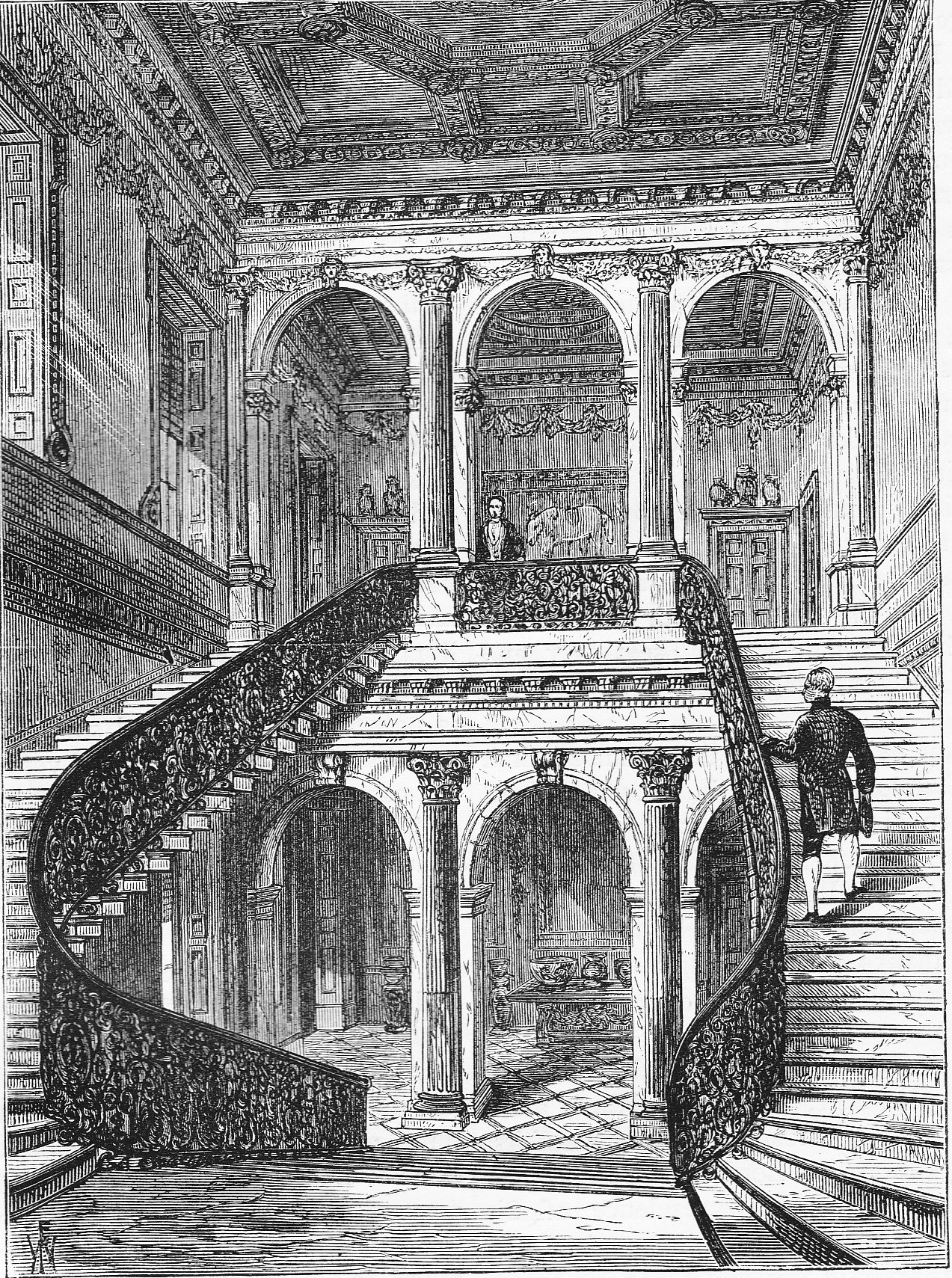
The grand staircase of Cannons, seen here after its removal to Chesterfield House, London in 1747, itself demolished in 1937

Brydges was made Earl of Caernavon in 1714 and later became duke of Chandos. His fortunes were damaged by financial losses in the South Sea Bubble of 1720. However, when his wife died in 1735, he remarried a wealthy 43-year-old widow, Lady Lydia Davall, who had £40,000 to her name.

Chandos died in 1744 and his debts were by then so great that his heirs had no choice but to sell the house and contents in a demolition auction of 1747. The architectural building adornments were sold off to other grand projects. The Palladian columns form the portico of the National Gallery in London.

A more modest house was built on the site in 1760 by William Hallett who had acquired wealth through his skill at cabinet making. This was itself enlarged by a succession of owners, notably Dennis O’Kelly owner of the outstanding racehorse Eclipse. By 1896 the parkland had begun to be sold off as building plots. Sir Arthur du Cros of Dunlop Rubber became tenant in 1902 and bought it in 1911. He engaged the celebrated Arts and Crafts architect Charles Mallows to remodel and enlarge the building between 1905-1908. The exterior of the current building is largely his work.

In 1929 the house was bought by the North London Collegiate School who still occupy it today. Part of the gardens remain as Canons Park in the care of the London Borough of Harrow.

The house gives its name to the modern local district, Canon's Park, which is largely built upon its parkland and is a wealthy north London suburb. This in turn gave its name to the Underground station of Canons Park on the Jubilee line.

== Architecture ==
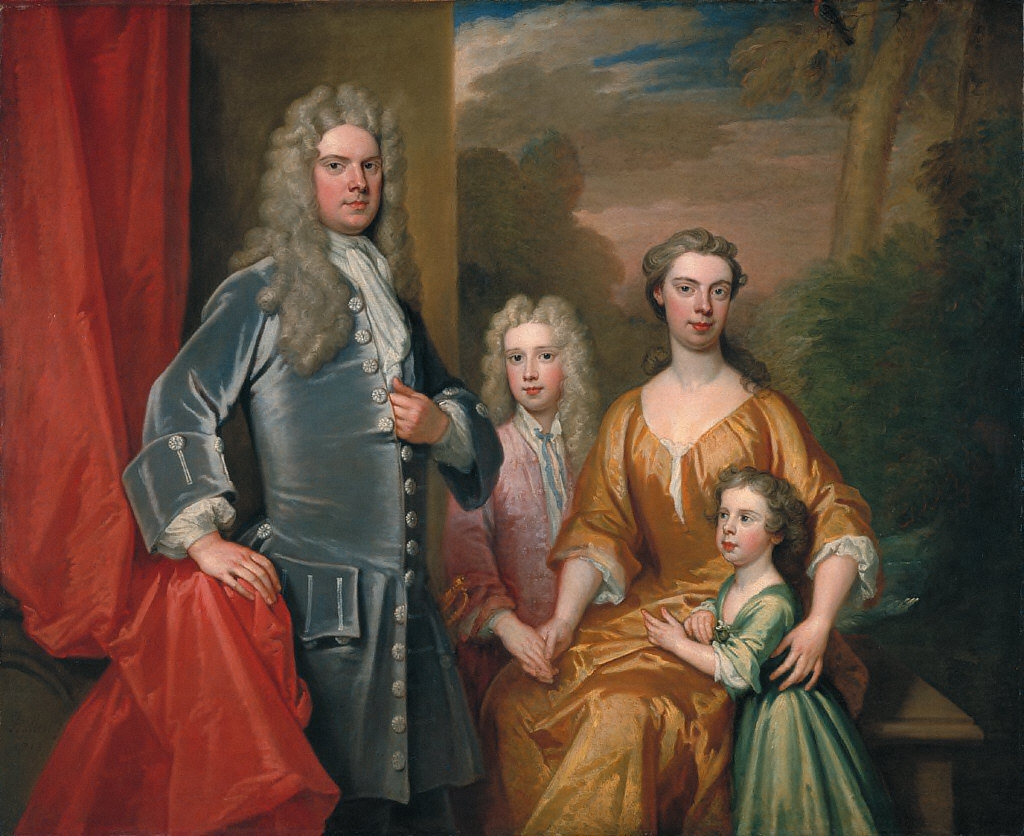
James Brydges (later 1st Duke of Chandos) and his family, 1713. Artist, Godfrey Kneller.

Chandos remodelled the pre-existing Jacobean house built by Thomas Lake (which is believed to have been designed by John Thorpe). The new three-storey house took 10 years to complete and was designed as a square block with four new pedimented facades and a large internal courtyard.

The Duke went through several architects beginning with William Talman in 1713 who produced twelve plans but was dismissed in 1714 before starting any building on the main house. Next was John James who designed the north and west ranges (and also rebuilt the local parish church, St Lawrence, Whitchurch, with a baroque interior). On advice from Sir John Vanbrugh the Duke appointed James Gibbs in 1715. Gibbs is known as an architect who worked in a baroque idiom but incorporated palladian elements. He designed the chapel (consecrated 29 August 1720) as well as the final designs for the four new facades. The designs for the interiors did not meet with approval from Vanbrugh who commented "The fronts v.fine... But the inside is of poor Invention" and Gibbs was dismissed in 1719. Cannons was completed under the supervision of the Duke's surveyors John Price and latterly Edward Shepard. A contemporary account from a 1722 visitor at the time that the finishing touches were being made to the interiors records:

The Salon... is to be supported by Marble Pillars and painted by Paullucci [sic Bellucci]; as is the great Staircase, which is all of Marble... this Staircase leads you into the Royal Apartments fronting the Parterre and grand canal and consists of a Suite of six noble rooms well proportioned, finely plaister'd and gilt by Pargotti [sic Giovanni Bagutti, a Swiss-Italian plasterer associated with the architect Gibbs] and the Ceilings painted by Paullucci; from these Apartments you go into my Lords dressing room and Library, fronting the gardens.

The Duke's constantly changing vision brought five different architects to it and though one of the last great Baroque houses Cannons also contributed to the development of Palladianism in England.

== Gardens ==
The grounds of Cannons extended to 105 acres (0.42 km^{2}) and were renowned for their magnificence. There was a pleasure garden an orchard and a grand terrace opening on to a parterre containing gilded statues.

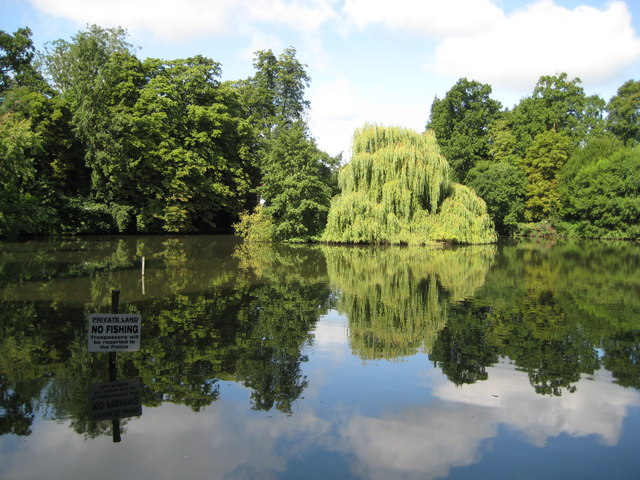
The Basin, Canons Park Estate, today. When the Duke of Chandos developed the estate in the early part of the 18th century, this ornamental pond was constructed along the approach drive from the south-east so that visitors caught their first sight of the Canons Park mansion once they had negotiated it.

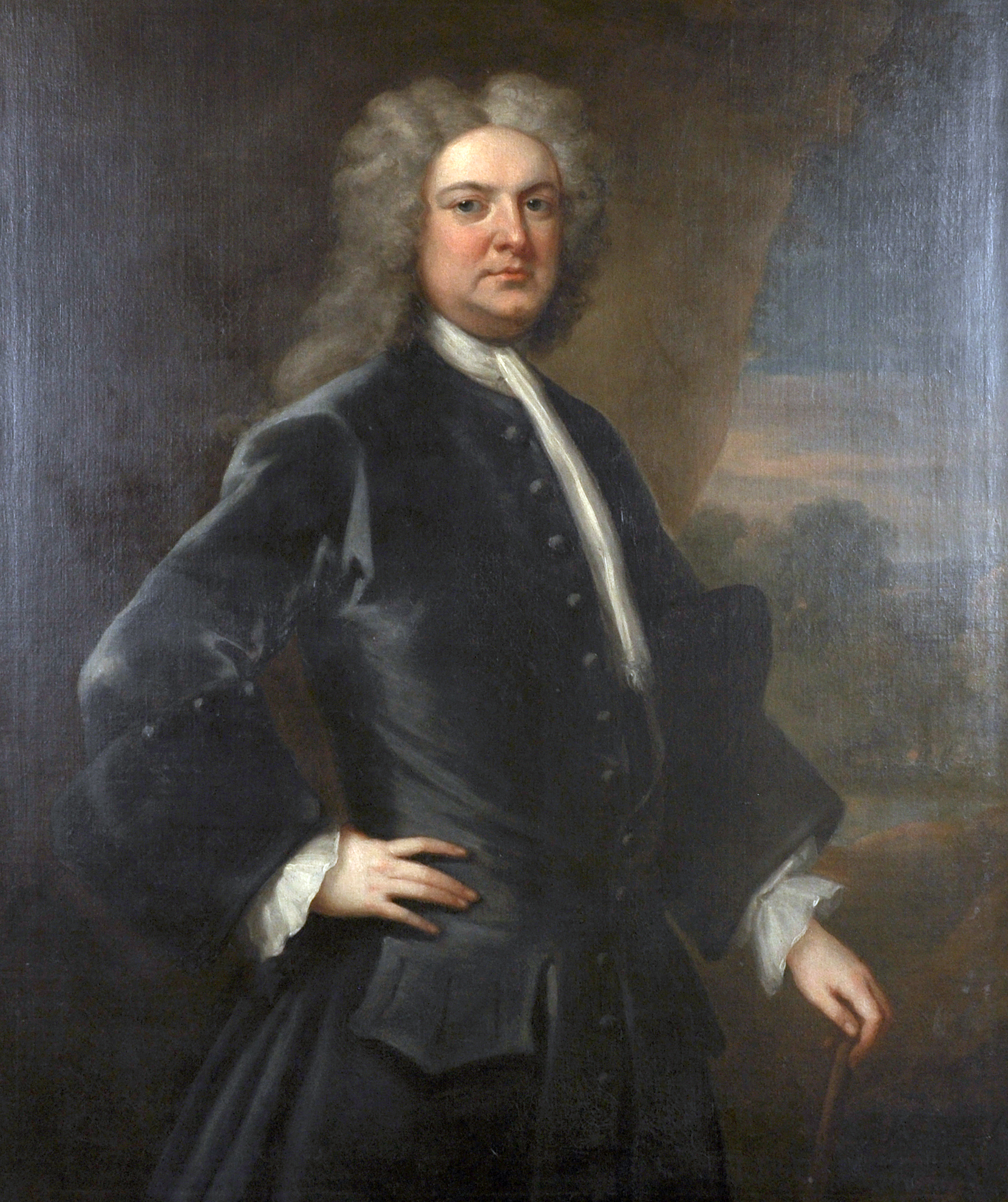
James Brydges, 1st Duke of Chandos (1673-1744), portrait by John Vanderbank, painted in 1722 and showing the newly constructed Basin at Cannons in the background.

Chandos had a water engineer of international fame in his household – his chaplain, the Rev John Theophilus Desaguliers, FRS. Desaguliers created a system of pipes of different materials and bores to feed the water features. In fact, he was better-known for his scientific expertise than his interest in his parishioners. The water gardens, which included a great basin, a canal and numerous ornamental fountains led Nicholas Hawksmoor to comment "I cannot but own that the water at Cannon's... is the main beauty of that situation and it cost him dear".

Another FRS associated with the Cannons garden was Richard Bradley, a horticulturalist who was to become the first professor of botany at the University of Cambridge. Bradley, who dedicated a gardening book to the Duke, supplied plants for the gardens.

Chandos, together with his head gardener Tilleman Bobart, oversaw changes at Cannons reflecting the eighteenth-century movement towards a more naturalistic style of landscape gardening. Some features from the original park survive, including two lakes, the Basin Lake and the Seven Acre Lake. English Heritage has included Canons Park on the National Register of Historic Parks and Gardens.

== Art and music ==
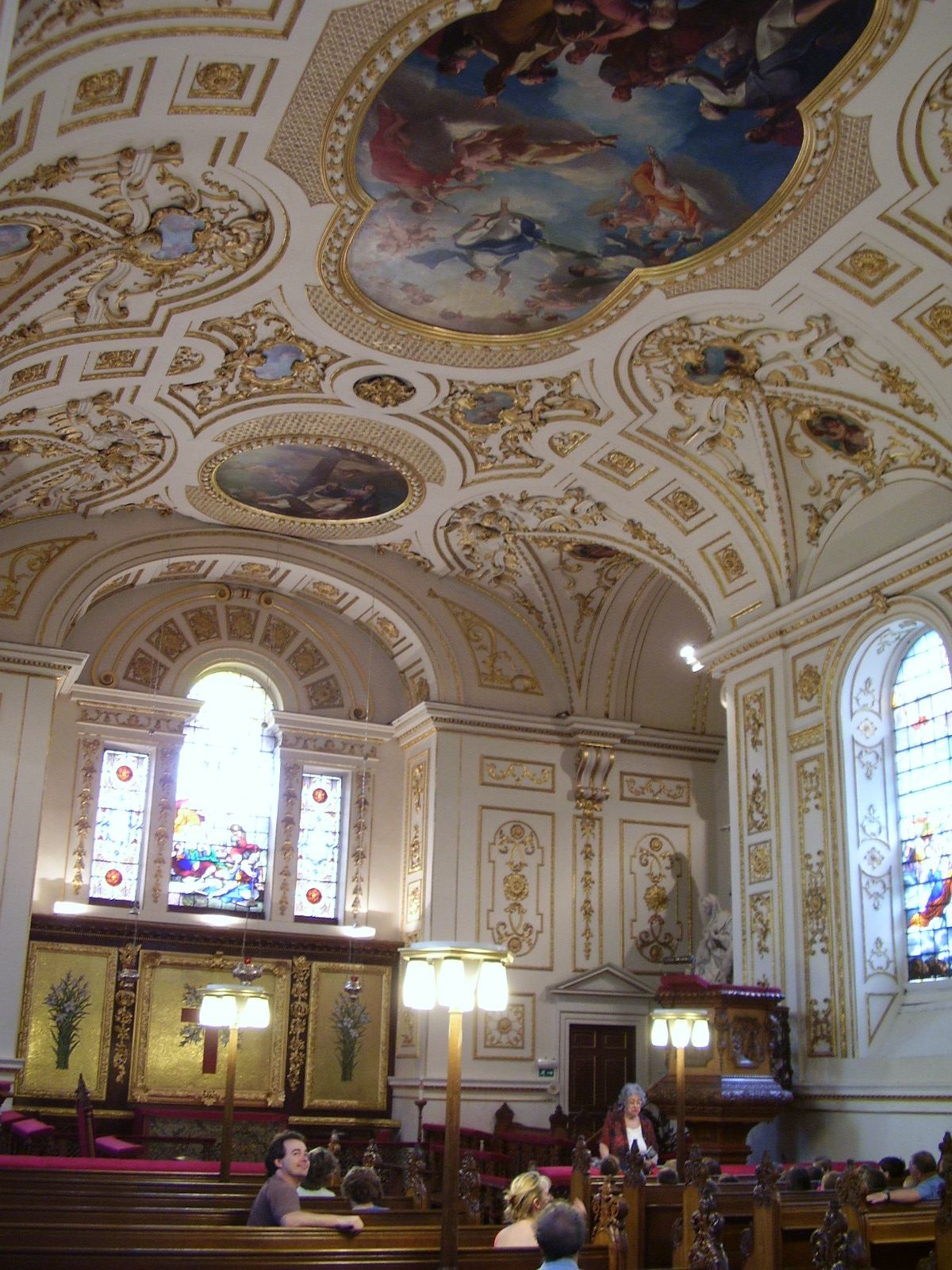
Antonio Bellucci's ceiling paintings from the Cannons chapel, now in Great Witley Church, Worcestershire

Chandos began collecting paintings before Cannons was built. Chandos, who had good contacts in the art market in the Netherlands, sometimes bought works unseen, relying on the judgement of his agents. One of the difficulties he faced in acquiring the best continental art was that the War of the Spanish Succession (1701–1714), which was a key factor in his great wealth, also made it more difficult to import art directly from Italy. Even so, his collection of Italian paintings included some of the great masters. Chandos also commissioned painters directly, for example, the portraitists Michael Dahl, Sir Godfrey Kneller and John Vanderbank, and the decorative painters Antonio Bellucci, Louis Laguerre and William Kent who worked on the interiors of the house. Chandos was a patron of the sculptors Grinling Gibbons and John Nost.

Chandos maintained a musical establishment; some of the musicians are known to have doubled as household servants but even so, musical standards were very high. The music director for twenty years was the German composer Johann Christoph Pepusch. He wrote a number of pieces of church music for the Cannons chapel. The size of the musical establishment at Cannons declined in the 1720s in response to the family's losses in the South Sea Bubble, a financial crash which took place in 1720.

By far the most famous musician associated with Cannons is George Frideric Handel. He attracted the patronage of noblemen such as Richard Boyle, 3rd Earl of Burlington, and he was based at Burlington House before becoming Cannons' resident composer from 1717 to 1718. It has been suggested that the move to Cannons was related to the fact that in 1717 there was reduced demand for his services in central London because operatic productions were experiencing a downturn.

Chandos had a taste for Italianate music and in 1719 became a patron of Handel's opera company in London. At Cannons, as well as employing continental musicians as composers, he also engaged continental instrumentalists. The singers, on the other hand, seem to have been mainly English, rather than the highly trained and expensive Italians who were the stars of the London opera scene.

== Demolition and dispersal ==
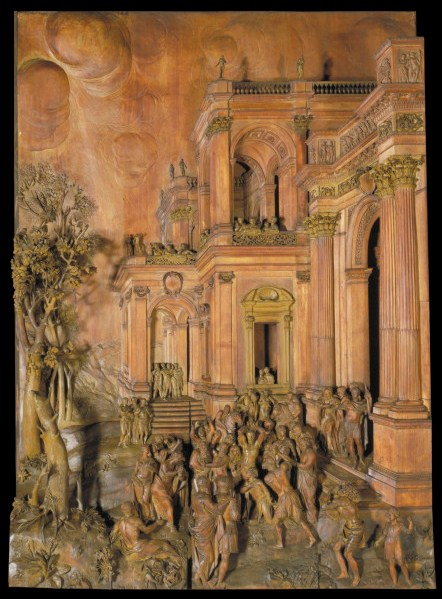
Grinling Gibbons' The Stoning of St Stephen

The Brydges lost a significant part of their fortune when the South Sea Bubble burst and their finances never recovered. Following the death of the first Duke, the very fabric of Cannons, all its contents and every fixture and fitting were auctioned to satisfy debts. A twelve-day sale began on 16 June 1747 and the sale catalogue included works by Titian, Giorgione, Raphael and Guercino. Amongst the most notable paintings were Caravaggio's Boy Bitten by a Lizard (wrongly attributed to Guercino in the catalogue) which the National Gallery in London acquired in 1986, and Nicolas Poussin's The Choice of Hercules which was purchased at the sale by Henry Hoare for Stourhead, his house in Wiltshire, where it still hangs. Of the sculptures Grinling Gibbons' carved panel The Stoning of St Stephen is now in the Victoria and Albert Museum, and a statue claiming to be of George II by John van Nost is in Golden Square.

The portico, railings and marble staircase with bronze balustrade were bought by the 4th Earl of Chesterfield for his new London home, Chesterfield House, South Audley Street, which was built in 1749 but like Cannons is no longer standing having been demolished in 1937. Another statue modelled by C. Burchard in about 1716 and cast by John Van Nost, of George I, was moved to Leicester Square, where, after frequent vandalism, it was removed in 1872.

The rest of the house and contents were dispersed across the country and the location of much has been lost, however some substantial elements can still be seen, including the Ionic columns from the colonnade which some sources now place in front of the National Gallery in London. Elements of the chapel, in particular stained glass windows designed by Sebastiano Ricci and made by glass painter Joshua Price, along with Bellucci's ceiling paintings were purchased by Thomas, Lord Foley and installed by James Gibbs in the Church of Saint Michael and All Angels, Great Witley, Worcestershire. The chapel's organ was built by Abraham Abraham Jordan Jr who, with his father, is credited with the invention of the swell box. There is some dispute as to where the instrument was moved, as some sources say it is identifiable as the organ in the church at Great Witley, whereas Holy Trinity Church, Gosport, claims to have some of the pipework. There is a tradition that the gates were removed to Trinity College, Oxford, but this is incorrect, for the College's two sets of gates both predate the demolition of Cannons and are well documented.

The estate itself was purchased by the cabinet maker William Hallett who in 1760 built a large villa on the site which today houses the North London Collegiate School, where part of the original temple can still be seen, and is known by the modern spelling, Canons. Hallett's villa was mentioned by John Byng, 5th Viscount Torrington, in 1788 as being of a more appropriate size for the location than Cannons: "the situation is too near London for such [former] display; being better suited for this present villa, sprung from the former demolition".

== In popular culture ==
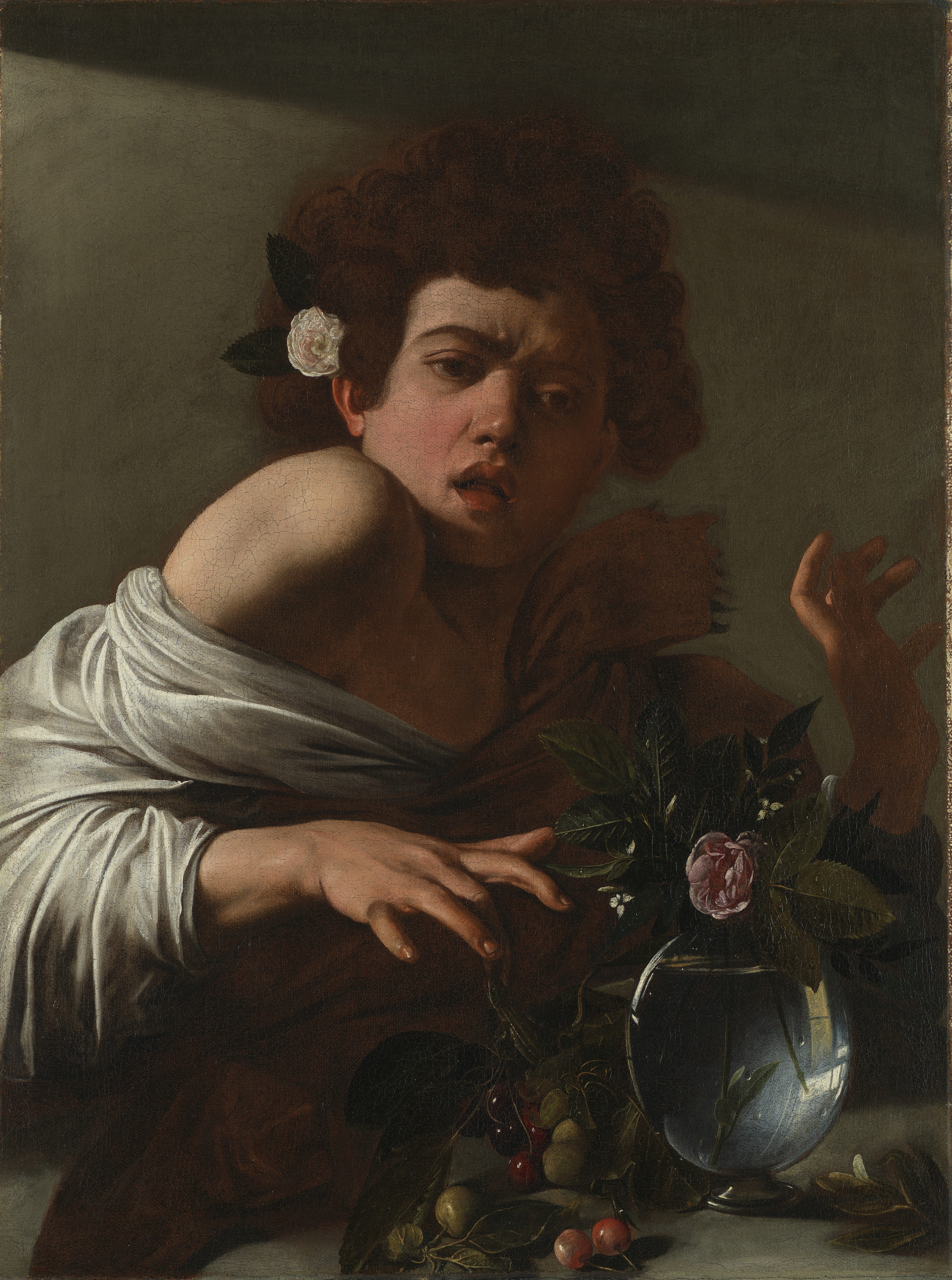
Caravaggio: Boy bitten by a lizard

Such was the fame of the house that the duke had to introduce crowd control measures – including a one-way system – to manage the large numbers of visitors who flocked to the estate. Cannons was featured in early travel guides including a 1725 travelogue by Daniel Defoe where he described Cannons' extravagance thus:

This palace is so beautiful in its situation, so lofty, so majestick the appearance of it, that a pen can but ill describe it... 'tis only fit to be talk'd of upon the very spot... The whole structure is built with such a Profusion of Expense and finished with such a Brightness of Fancy and Delicacy of Judgment.

A few years later Alexander Pope was seen as satirising Cannons in his poem Of Taste (1731), which ridicules the villa of an aristocrat called "Timon" and includes the lines:

Light quirks of Musick, broken and uneven,
Make the soul dance upon a Jig to Heaven.
On painted Cielings [sic] you devoutly stare,
Where sprawl the Saints of Verrio or Laguerre...

— lines 143-146

Timon, like Chandos, is a patron of the painter Louis Laguerre and listens to elaborate music in his chapel. After adverse comment, including a caricature by William Hogarth of Pope splattering Chandos' carriage, the poet apologised to the Duke, denying that any comparison with Cannons was intended, but it has been suggested that Pope could have anticipated that some people would see a connection. Within a few years another point of comparison had emerged – Pope had prophesied the demolition of Timon's villa.

== See also ==
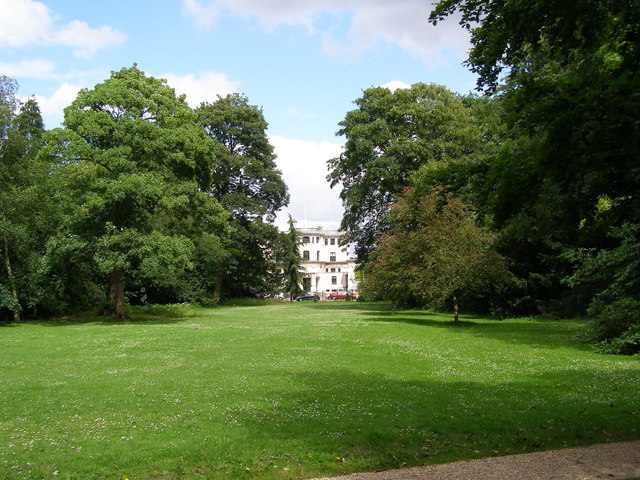
The Georgian style villa that replaced Cannons, seen from the west in Canon's Park. Now occupied by the North London Collegiate School.

- Handel at Cannons
- Canons Park
- History of Edgware
- Rococo
- North London Collegiate School
- James Brydges, 1st Duke of Chandos

== Bibliography ==
- Cassandra Brydges, Duchess of Chandos, 1670-1735: Life and Letters, Editor Rosemary O'Day, Boydell Press, 2007 ISBN 1843833425
