= Brydges baronets =

Extinct baronetcy in the Baronetage of the United Kingdom

There have been two baronetcies created for persons with the surname Brydges, one in the Baronetage of England and one in the Baronetage of the United Kingdom. Both creations are extinct.

The Brydges Baronetcy, of Wilton in the County of Hereford, was created in the Baronetage of England on 17 May 1627. For more information on this creation, see Duke of Chandos.

The Brydges, later Egerton-Barrett-Brydges Baronetcy, of Denton Court in the County of Kent, was created in the Baronetage of the United Kingdom on 27 May 1815. For more information on this creation, see Egerton-Barrett-Brydges baronets.

== Brydges baronets, of Wilton (1627) ==
Escutcheon of the Brydges baronets of Wilton

- Sir Giles Brydges, 1st Baronet (c. 1573–1637)
- Sir John Brydges, 2nd Baronet (1623–1652)
- Sir James Brydges, 3rd Baronet (1642–1714) (succeeded as 8th Baron Chandos in 1676)

For further succession, see Duke of Chandos

=== Family tree ===
Family tree of Dukes of Chandos

Baron Chandos (or Chaundos, 1st creation), 1337
Roger de Chandos d. 1353; 1st Lord Chandos
Barony Chandos (1st creation) possibly extinct, 1353
Thomas Chandos c. 1333–1375; 2nd Lord Chandos de jure High Sheriff of Herefordshire
Elizabeth Chandos	John Chandos c. 1349–1428; 3rd Lord Chandos de jure High Sheriff of Herefordshire
Barony of Chandos abeyant, 1428
Alice de Berkeley before 1379–1414	Margaret de Chandos
Barony of Chandos abeyance terminated, 1458
Giles Brugge; 1396–1467; 4th Lord Chandos de jure
Thomas Brugge before 1427–1492/93; 5th Lord Chandos de jure
Giles Brugge c. 1462–1511; 6th Lord Chandos de jure
Baron Chandos (2nd creation), 1554
John Brydges; 1492–1557; 7th Lord Chandos de jure, 1st Baron Chandos
Edmund Brydges before 1522–1573; 8th Lord Chandos de jure, 2nd Baron Chandos	Charles Brydes; 1528–1619
Baronet Brydges, of Wilton, 1627
Giles Brydges; 1548–1594; 9th Lord Chandos de jure, 3rd Baron Chandos	William Brydges c. 1552–1602; 10th Lord Chandos de jure, 4th Baron Chandos	Giles Brydges c. 1573–1637; 1st Baronet
Grey Brydges c. 1581–1621; 11th Lord Chandos de jure, 5th Baron Chandos	John Brydges; 1623–1652; 2nd Baronet
George Brydges; 1620–1655; 12th Lord Chandos de jure, 6th Baron Chandos	William Brydges d. 1676; 13th Lord Chandos de jure, 7th Baron Chandos	James Brydges; 1642–1714; 14th Lord Chandos de jure, 8th Baron Chandos, 3rd Baronet
Earl of Carnarvon (2nd creation) and Viscount Wilton, 1714; Duke of Chandos and Marquess of Carnarvon, 1719
James Brydges; 1673–1744; 1st Duke of Chandos, etc., 15th Lord Chandos de jure, 9th Baron Chandos, 4th Baronet
John Brydges; 1703–1727 styled Marquess of Carnarvon	Henry Brydges; 1708–1771; 2nd Duke of Chandos, etc., 16th Lord Chandos de jure, 10th Baron Chandos, 5th Baronet
James Brydges; 1731–1789; 3rd Duke of Chandos, etc., 17th Lord Chandos de jure, 10th Baron Chandos, 7th Lord Kinloss de jure, 5th Baronet
All titles except lordship Kinloss extinct, 1789

== Brydges, later Egerton-Barrett-Brydges baronets, of Denton Court (1815) ==
- see Egerton-Barrett-Brydges baronets

== See also ==
- Jones-Brydges baronets
