= Duchess of Chandos =

Duchess of Chandos may refer to:

- Anna Eliza Brydges, Duchess of Chandos
- Cassandra Willoughby, Duchess of Chandos
- Cassandra, Duchess of Chandos and second wife of James Brydges, 1st Duke of Chandos
- Lydia Catherine, Duchess of Chandos and third wife of James Brydges, 1st Duke of Chandos
- Mary, Duchess of Chandos and first wife of Henry Brydges, 2nd Duke of Chandos
- Anne, Duchess of Chandos and second wife of Henry Brydges, 2nd Duke of Chandos
