= Henry Brydges =

Henry Brydges may refer to:

- Henry Brydges (died 1539), MP for Ludgershall
- Henry Brydges, 2nd Duke of Chandos (1708–1771)
- Henry James Brydges, 1st Duke of Chandos (1673–1744)

== See also ==
- Henry Bridges (disambiguation)
