= Chandos Mausoleum =

Part of St Lawrence Whitchurch in Harrow, London

Coordinates: 51.60838°N 0.28931°W

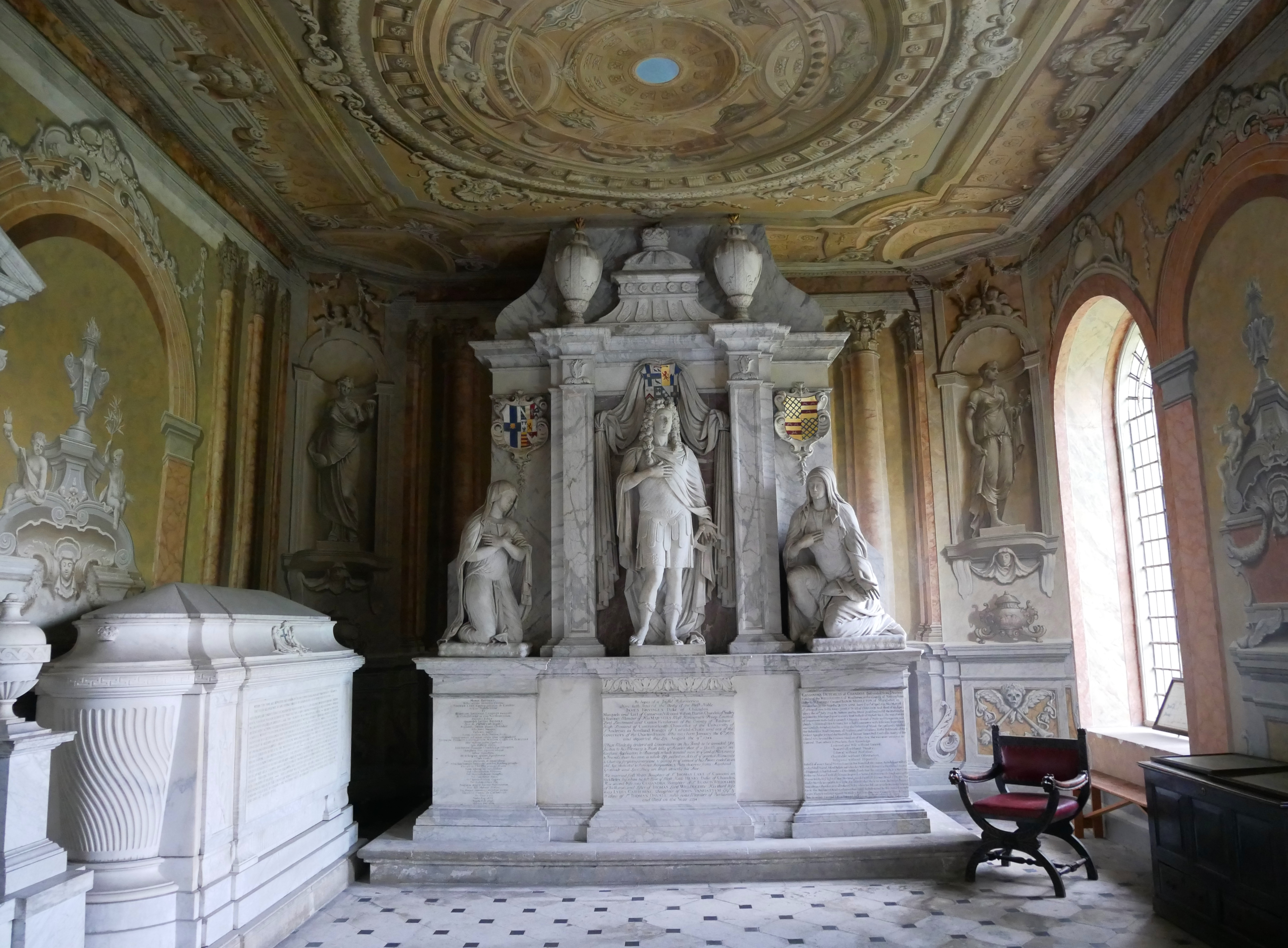
The west end of the mausoleum

The Chandos Mausoleum is an early 18th-century English Baroque building by James Gibbs in the care of the Churches Conservation Trust. The mausoleum is attached to the north side of the church of St Lawrence Whitchurch in the London Borough of Harrow, England. The church including the mausoleum is recorded in the National Heritage List for England as a designated Grade I listed building.

== History ==
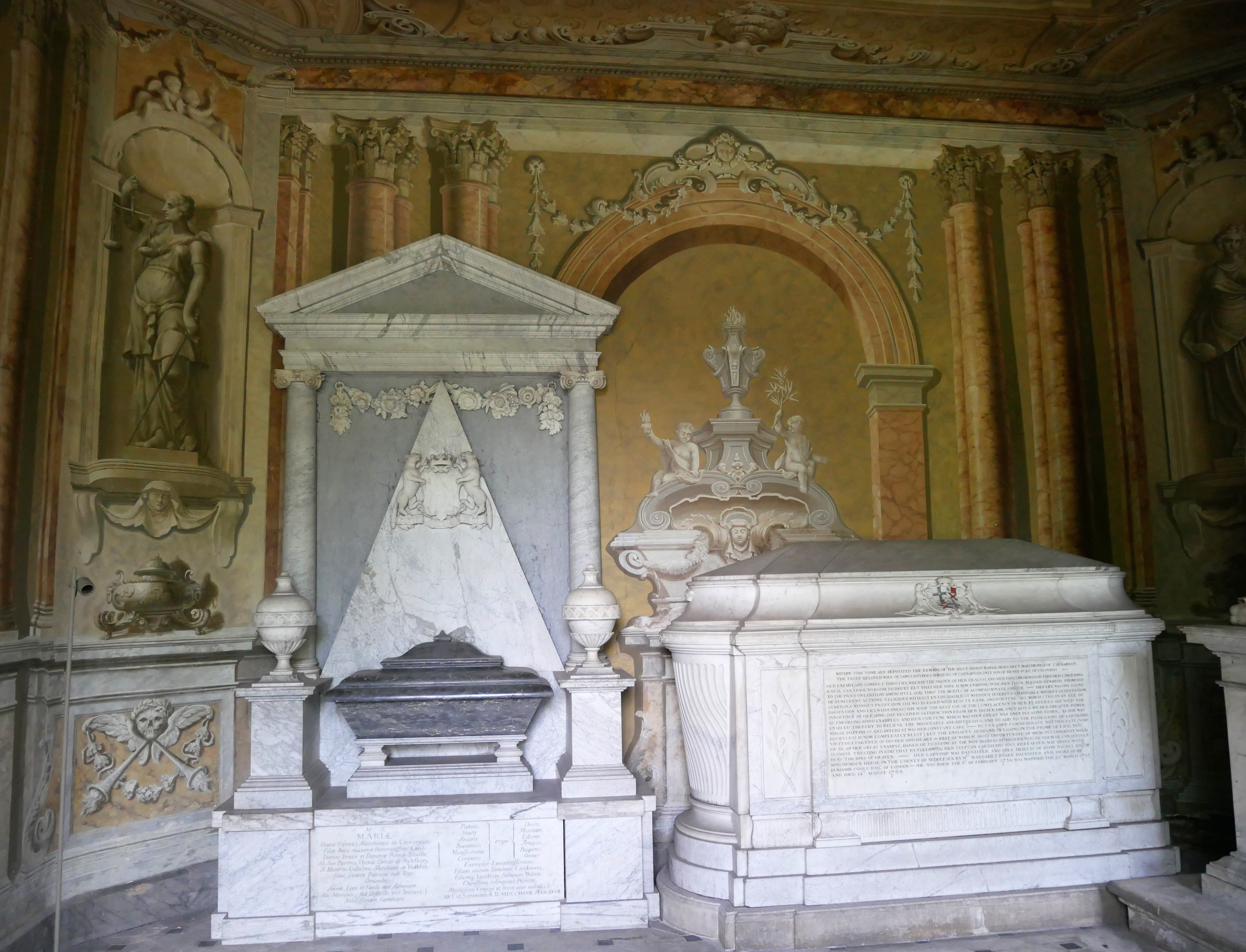
The south wall of the mausoleum

The mausoleum was intended as the final resting place of the Dukes of Chandos. The church and mausoleum are sited at the southeast corner of Canons Park which was an estate acquired by James Brydges, later 1st Duke of Chandos. Brydges rebuilt the house on the estate, Cannons, employing Gibbs as one of his architects. Brydges also rebuilt the church, which was a medieval building, to a design by John James. The church reopened in 1716, and originally had a chapel for family monuments. The mausoleum was added in 1735, the year Brydges' second wife died.

On the afternoon of 13 July 1916 a festival was held at St Lawrence's to celebrate the bicentenary, with music by Handel, who was the Duke's chapel master in 1716. An anthem, I was Glad, was written by Edward Cutler for the event, and the rector C. W. Scott-Moncrieff gave an address on the spiritual influence of Handel. An organ concerto was played by M. F. W. Belchamber.

== Decoration ==
Like the church itself, the interior of the mausoleum is decorated with wall-paintings which feature trompe-l'œil effects. The ceiling is painted with a miniature copy of the dome of the Pantheon, Rome. The style is Rococo and generally playful, although skulls are depicted. The artist for the mausoleum was Gaetano Brunetti. Some sources say Francesco Sleter was also involved.

== Memorials ==
The mausoleum contains memorials to members of the Chandos family. On the west wall is a sculptured monument to the 1st Duke which originally stood in the church. It was commissioned from Grinling Gibbons, although Pevsner is sceptical about the extent to which it was executed by Gibbons rather than his workshop. The Duke is shown in a wig dressed as a Roman citizen. This figure is flanked by plain pilasters outside which are the kneeling figures of two of his wives, Mary Lake and Cassandra Willoughby.

There are two monuments on the south wall. One is a black sarcophagus against a white pyramid to the memory of Lady Mary Bruce, the first wife of the future 2nd Duke of Chandos, who died in 1738. It was designed by Sir Henry Cheere. The other is a white sarcophagus to Margaret, the first wife of the future 3rd Duke of Chandos, who died in 1760.

== Access ==
The church is an active Anglican parish church, and the mausoleum is vested in the Churches Conservation Trust. The mausoleum is open on Sundays.
