= Sir Rose Price, 1st Baronet =

British planter and landowner

Sir Rose Price
- Born: Rose Price; 21 November 1768
- Died: 24 September 1834 (aged 65)
- Burial place: Rose Price mausoleum, Madron churchyard, England
- Spouse: Elizabeth Lambert (m. 1795)
- Children: 10 (or 14)
- Parent(s): John Price and Elizabeth Williams Brammer

Sir Rose Price, 1st Baronet (21 November 1768 – 24 September 1834) was a British planter and landowner who owned sugar plantations in the colony of Jamaica.

== Career ==
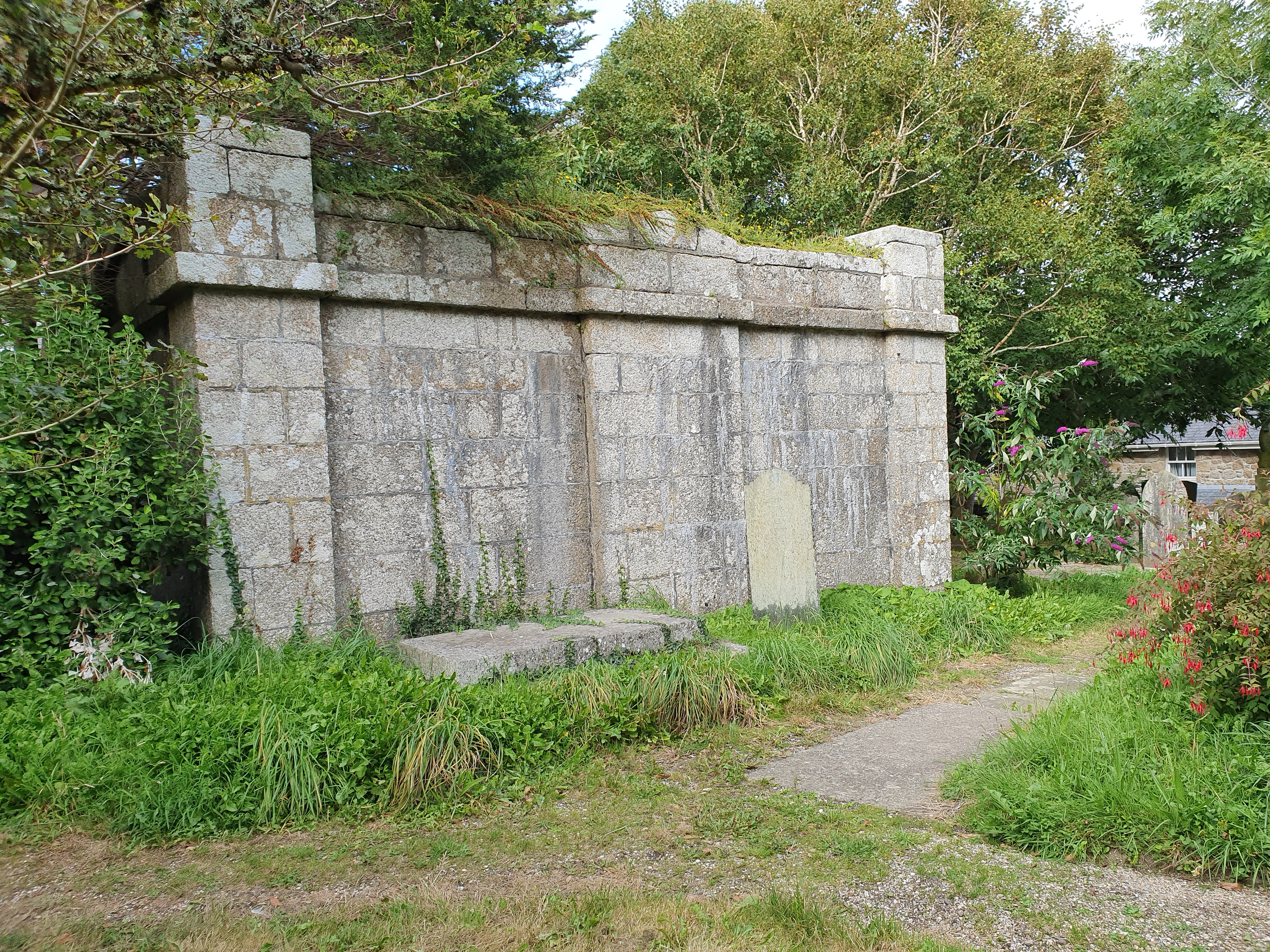
Rose Price mausoleum

On the death of his father in 1797, Price inherited a number of plantations on Jamaica,

- Mickleton Penn – which produced sugar and rum, and in 1799 had 34 enslaved people
- Spring Garden – which produced corn, steers, mules, horses and sheep
- Cocoree – 580 acres (230 ha) when inherited, Rose Price made four purchases of 300 acres (120 ha) each
- Worthy Park – which grew cane and produced sugar and rum.

In 1813, Price purchased Trengwainton and lived at Kenegie in nearby Gulval, until 1817, while he rebuilt the house and pleasure gardens under the direction of Mr George Brown. While rebuilding Trengwainton, the Price baronetcy, of Trengwainton, in the parish of Madron, was created in the baronetage of the United Kingdom on 30 May 1815.

== Family ==
Price was the only child of John Price (1738–1797) and Elizabeth Williams Brammer.

During the time Price spent at Worthy Park, he had two children with a 13-year-old slave child, Lizette Nash (1782–1856). These two children were educated in England on his return.

Price married Elizabeth Lambart, daughter of Charles Lambart and Frances Dutton, in 1795. He acquired the title of 1st Baronet Price, of Trengwainton in 1815. Depending on the source, they had 10 or 14 children,

- Rose Lambart (4 July 1799 – 15 January 1826), married Catherine, Countess of Desard (died 16 January 1826)
- Sir Charles Dutton, 2nd Baronet (7 December 1800 – 18 May 1872)
- Captain Francis (11 March 1804 – 14 September 1863)
- Elizabeth Mary (1805 – 4 July 1843), married John Basset (1791–1843) whose family was linked to Tehidy Park.
- Charlotte (1806 – 25 October 1868), married Thomas Charles Higgins (1797–1865) of Turvey House
- John (21 October 1808 – 27 March 1857)
- George (10 April 1812 – 29 September 1890)
- Louisa Douglas (1815 – 18 December 1881)
- Thomas (3 Nov 1817 – 1865)
- Jane Frances (1819 – 19 August 1903)

Rose Price died on 24 September 1834 and is buried in the Rose Price mausoleum, Madron churchyard.

Baronetage of the United Kingdom
New creation	Baronet (of Trengwainton); 1815–1834	Succeeded by Charles Dutton Price
