= Price baronets =

Set index for Price baronets

There have been six baronetcies created for persons with the surname Price, one each in the baronetages of England and of Great Britain and four in the baronetage of the United Kingdom. Two of the creations are extant as of 2026.

- Price baronets of the Priory (1657)
- Price baronets of Jamaica (1768)
- Price baronets of Spring Grove (1804): see Rugge-Price baronets
- Price baronets of Trengwainton (1815)
- Price baronets of Foxley (1828)
- Price baronets of Ardingly (1953): see Sir Henry Price, 1st Baronet (1877–1963)

== See also ==
- Green-Price baronets
- Pryce baronets
- Pryce-Jones baronets
- Pryse baronets
