= Henry Bridges =

Henry Bridges may refer to:

- Henry Bridges (clockmaker) (1697–1754), English carpenter, showman and clockmaker
- Henry Bridges (musician) (1915–1986), American jazz saxophonist
- Henry Bridges (priest) (1675–1728), English Anglican priest
- Henry L. Bridges (1907–2002), American lawyer and politician in North Carolina
- Henry Styles Bridges (1898–1961), governor of New Hampshire and U.S. senator

== See also ==
- Henry Brydges (disambiguation)
