= Simeon baronets of Grazeley (1815) =

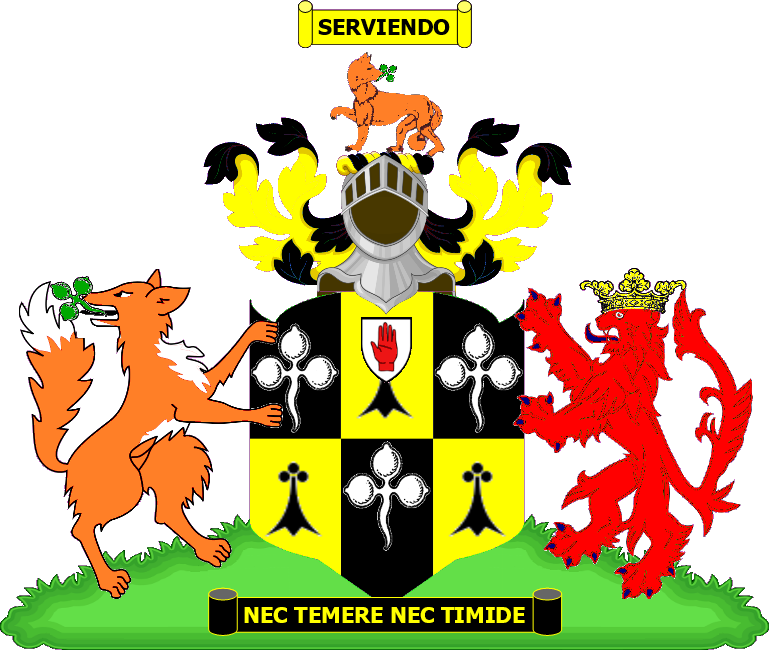
- Crest: A fox passant-reguardant Proper in the mouth a trefoil slipped Vert.
- Shield: Per fess Sable and Or a pale counterchanged in chief an ermine spot of the first between two trefoils slipped of the second and in base a like trefoil between two like ermine spots.
- Supporters: Dexter a fox reguardant Proper in the mouth a trefoil slipped Vert, sinister a lion Gules ducally crowned Or.
- Motto: Serviendo; Nec Temere Nec Timide

The Simeon baronetcy, of Grazeley in the County of Berkshire, was created in the Baronetage of the United Kingdom on 22 May 1815 for John Simeon, Member of Parliament for Reading and Senior Master of the Court of Chancery. The evangelical cleric Charles Simeon was his brother.

The 2nd Baronet represented the Isle of Wight in the House of Commons. He married Louisa Edith, daughter and heiress of Sir Fitzwilliam Barrington, 10th and last Baronet, of Barrington Hall (see Barrington baronets). The third Baronet was also Member of Parliament for the Isle of Wight while the fourth Baronet sat for Southampton. The eighth Baronet was Professor of Political Science and Law at the University of Toronto.

As of 2026 the present Baronet has not successfully proven his succession and is therefore not on the Official Roll of the Baronetage, with the baronetcy considered dormant.

== Simeon baronets, of Grazeley (1815) ==
- Sir John Simeon, 1st Baronet (1756–1824)
- Sir Richard Godin Simeon, 2nd Baronet (1784–1854)
- Sir John Simeon, 3rd Baronet (1815–1870)
- Sir John Stephen Barrington Simeon, 4th Baronet (1850–1909)
- Sir Edmund Charles Simeon, 5th Baronet (1855–1915)
- Sir John Walter Barrington Simeon, 6th Baronet (1886–1957)
- Sir John Edmund Barrington Simeon, 7th Baronet (1911–1999)
- Sir Richard Edmund Barrington Simeon, 8th Baronet (1943–2013)
- Sir Stephen George Barrington Simeon, 9th Baronet (born 1970) has not established his claim to the title.

== Extended family ==
Charles Simeon, third son of the 1st Baronet, was a rear-admiral in the Royal Navy. His great-grandson Sir Charles Edward Barrington Simeon (1889–1955) was a vice-admiral in the Royal Navy.

== Notes ==
Baronetage of the United Kingdom
Preceded by Seton-Steuart baronets	Simeon baronets of Grazeley; 22 May 1815	Succeeded by Brydges baronets
