= Henry Bridges (priest) =

English Anglican priest

Henry Bridges (4 July 1675 – 9 May 1728) was an English Anglican priest.

The son of James Brydges, 8th Baron Chandos, and younger brother of James Brydges, 1st Duke of Chandos, he was educated at Christ Church, Oxford. He served as chaplain to Queen Anne, rector of Amersham in Buckinghamshire, a canon of St Paul's Cathedral, and was Archdeacon of Rochester from 1720 until his death.

He married in 1705 Annabella Atkyns and together they had several children.

He invested £10,000 (equivalent to £1,786,500 in 2025) in the Royal African Company, a major slave-trading business, in May 1720.
