= Preston baronets of Beeston St Lawrence (1815) =

The Preston baronetcy, of Beeston St Lawrence in the County of Norfolk, was created in the Baronetage of the United Kingdom on 30 May 1815 for Thomas Hulton Preston. Born Thomas Hulton, he was the son of Henry Hulton and his wife Elizabeth, daughter of Isaac Preston of Beeston St Lawrence, whose estates he inherited. In 1804 he assumed the surname of Preston in lieu of his patronymic. He was a militia colonel in the Norfolk volunteer infantry.

The 2nd Baronet served as High Sheriff of Norfolk in 1847.

== Preston baronets, of Beeston St Lawrence (1815) ==
- Sir Thomas Hulton Preston, 1st Baronet (1767–1823)
- Sir Jacob Henry Preston, 2nd Baronet (1812–1891)
- Sir Henry Jacob Preston, 3rd Baronet (1851–1897)
- Sir Jacob Preston, 4th Baronet (1887–1918)
- Sir Edward Hulton Preston, 5th Baronet (1888–1963)
- Sir Thomas Hildebrand Preston, 6th Baronet (1886–1976)
- Sir Ronald Douglas Hildebrand Preston, 7th Baronet (1916–1999)
- Sir Philip Charles Henry Hulton Preston, 8th Baronet (1946–2021)
- Sir Philip Thomas Henry Preston, 9th Baronet (born 1990)

Coat of arms of the baronets of Beeston St Lawrence
Crest A crescent Or. Escutcheon Ermine, on a chief sable three crescents Or. Motto Lucem spero clariorem (I hope for a brighter light)

Baronetage of the United Kingdom
Preceded by Brydges baronets	Preston baronets of Beeston St Lawrence; 30 May 1815	Succeeded by Price baronets
