= Waller baronets of Braywick Lodge (1815) =

The Waller baronetcy, of Braywick Lodge in the County of Berkshire, was created in the Baronetage of the United Kingdom on 30 May 1815 for Wathen Waller, Groom of the Bedchamber to the Duke of Clarence and St Andrews. The 3rd Baronet was a major general.

The 7th Baronet was an author and poet and a fellow of the Royal Society of Literature. He left no heir, and title became extinct on his death in 1995.

== Waller baronets, of Braywick Lodge (1815) ==
- Sir (Jonathan) Wathen Waller, 1st Baronet (1769–1853). Born Wathen Phipps, he was the son of Joshua Phipps and his wife Anne, daughter of Thomas Waller, and assumed by sign-manual in 1814 the surname of Waller in lieu of his patronymic as the heir of his maternal great-uncle James Waller.
- Sir Thomas Wathen Waller, 2nd Baronet (1805–1892)
- Sir George Henry Waller, 3rd Baronet (1837–1892)
- Sir Francis Ernest Waller, 4th Baronet (1880–1914)
- Sir Wathen Arthur Waller, 5th Baronet (1881–1947)
- Sir Edmund Waller, 6th Baronet (1871–1954)
- Sir John Stanier Waller, 7th Baronet (1917–1995)

== Notes ==
Baronetage of the United Kingdom
Preceded by Price baronets	Waller baronets of Braywick Lodge; 30 May 1815	Succeeded by Jephson baronets
