= Canons Park =

Area in London, England

Coordinates: 51.6093°N 0.2884°W

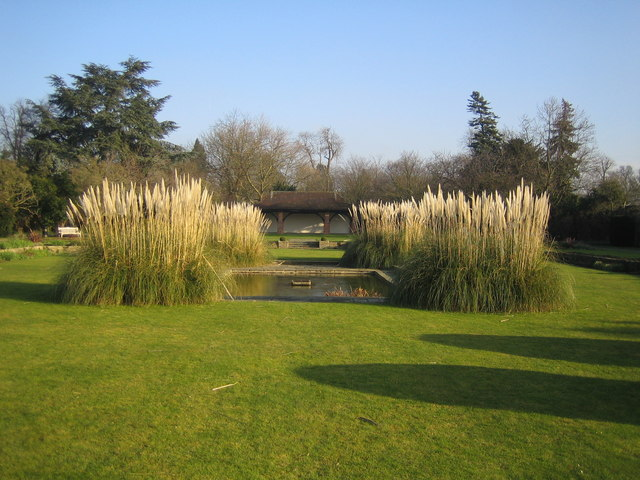
- George V Memorial Garden in the Canons Park

- Location within Greater London
- OS grid reference: TQ1891
- London borough: Harrow
- Ceremonial county: Greater London
- Region: London
- Country: England
- Sovereign state: United Kingdom
- Post town: EDGWARE
- Postcode district: HA8
- Dialling code: 020
- Police: Metropolitan
- Fire: London
- Ambulance: London
- UK Parliament: Harrow East
- London Assembly: Brent and Harrow

Canons Park is a public park and the name of its surrounding residential area, in the Edgware district of the London Borough of Harrow, north-west London. Canons Park was a country estate which partially survives today as a public park. St. Lawrence's Church, the parish church of Little Stanmore, and the accompanying Chandos Mausoleum are located here.

== Etymology and history ==
"Canons" refers to the canons or monks of the Augustinian priory of St Bartholomew in Smithfield, London. The site was a part of the endowment of the Priory of St Bartholomew's which operated St Bartholomew's Hospital in London.

Canons Park is largely located on the site of the magnificent early 18th-century country house Cannons built between 1713 and 1725 by Brydges, after his wife Mary died, along with his second wife, Cassandra Willoughby.

A few years after the Duke's death in 1744 this house was also demolished. The current building on the site housing the North London Collegiate School was built around 1760 by the gentleman cabinet-maker William Hallett. The original house-site, transformed into ambitious Edwardian gardens, was bought in 1929 by the school for £17,500 (equivalent to £961,000 in 2025). A large portion of the original gardens of James Brydges' house now form the public pleasure gardens of Canons Park. The modern park includes the Memorial Gardens, a folly known as 'the Temple' (not to be confused with a different folly of the same name within the North London Collegiate School grounds) and an orchard.

Canons Drive follows the original path of the entrance to James Brydges' house, retaining the two large pillars which acted as gateposts where it met the Edgware Road. The remains of a second, raised, carriageway running from Cannons can be traced through Canons Park in the direction of Whitchurch Lane. A 7-acre (28,000 m^{2}) lake and a separate duck pond also formed part of the original Cannons Estate and survive within the boundaries of the Canons Drive residential area.

== Canons Park ==
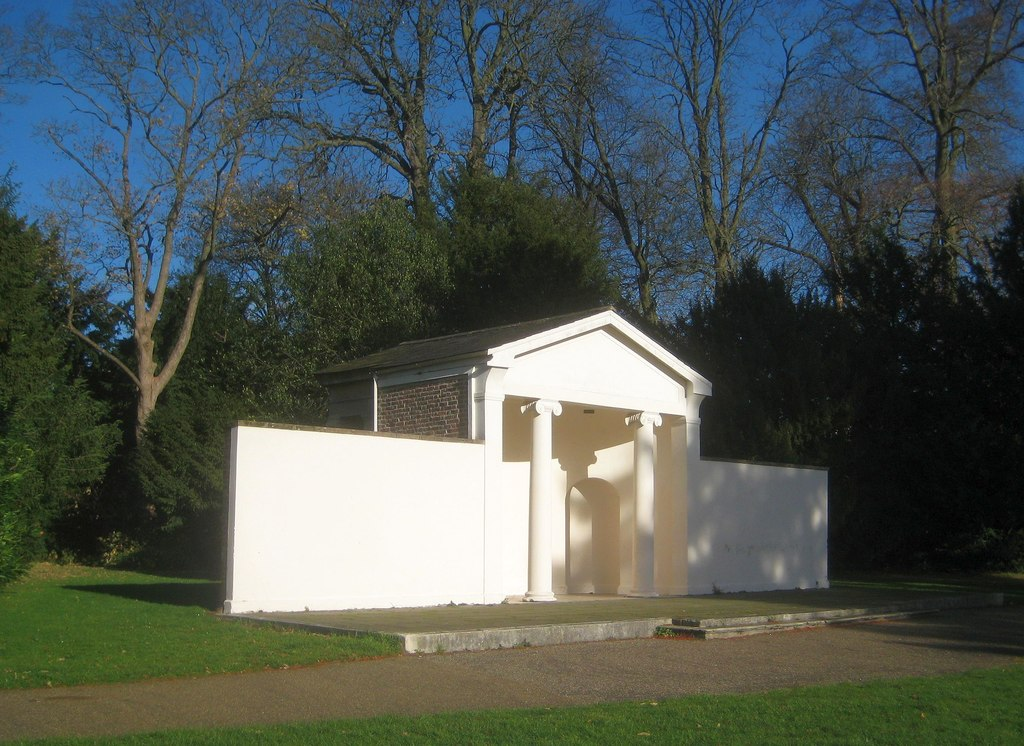
Canons Park Garden Temple

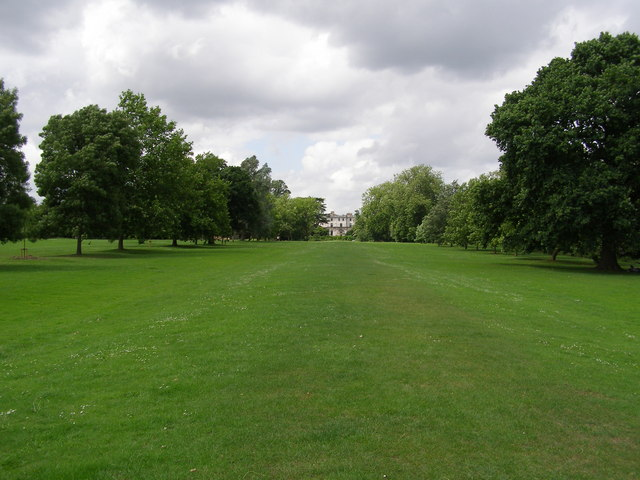
View in the Canons Park; North London Collegiate School can be seen in the background

Canons Park, 18 hectares (44 acres) in size, is listed as Grade II on the Register of Parks and Gardens. The designation recognises features surviving from the ducal park (including two lakes, the Basin Lake and the Seven Acre Lake.

The King George V Memorial Garden is a walled garden in the park. This area was originally part of the duke's kitchen gardens and was re-designed in the 1930s, after the park became public. The garden reflects the 1930s period, with a structure of evergreens highlighted by seasonal displays. It features a central square pool surrounded by a raised terrace with steps, formal flower beds and a pavilion. In 2006-7 the garden and the park were restored with the support of the Heritage Lottery Fund.

== St Lawrence Whitchurch ==
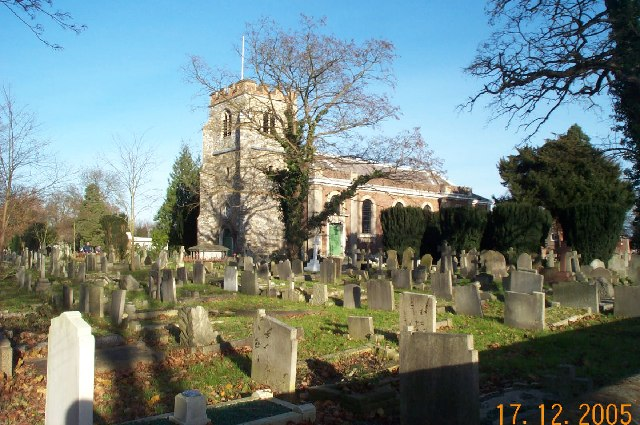
St Lawrence Church

Situated adjacent to the public park is the church of St Lawrence Whitchurch, the parish church of Little Stanmore. The church has a stone tower dating from c. 1360 and the main body of the church was rebuilt in a Continental Baroque style in 1714–16 for Brydges by John James (Colvin). The interior walls and ceiling are covered with paintings.

On the north side of the church is the Chandos Mausoleum, again built to the order of the first Duke of Chandos. The centrepiece documented by Grinling Gibbons, 1717, is a Baroque monument to the Duke and his first two wives, for which the Duke felt he had overpaid. In addition to James Brydges, 1st Duke of Chandos and his first two wives, James Brydges, 3rd Duke of Chandos has also been buried here.

== Barnet F.C. ==
Barnet F.C.'s training ground complex, The Hive, opened in the locality in 2009. The club constructed their new 5,176 capacity home ground at the site, which opened in summer 2013, and is shared with Tottenham Hotspur F.C. Women and London Bees.

== Services and transport ==
The area is served by Canons Park tube station of the London Underground. The 79, 186 and 340 buses go past the station.

== Housing ==
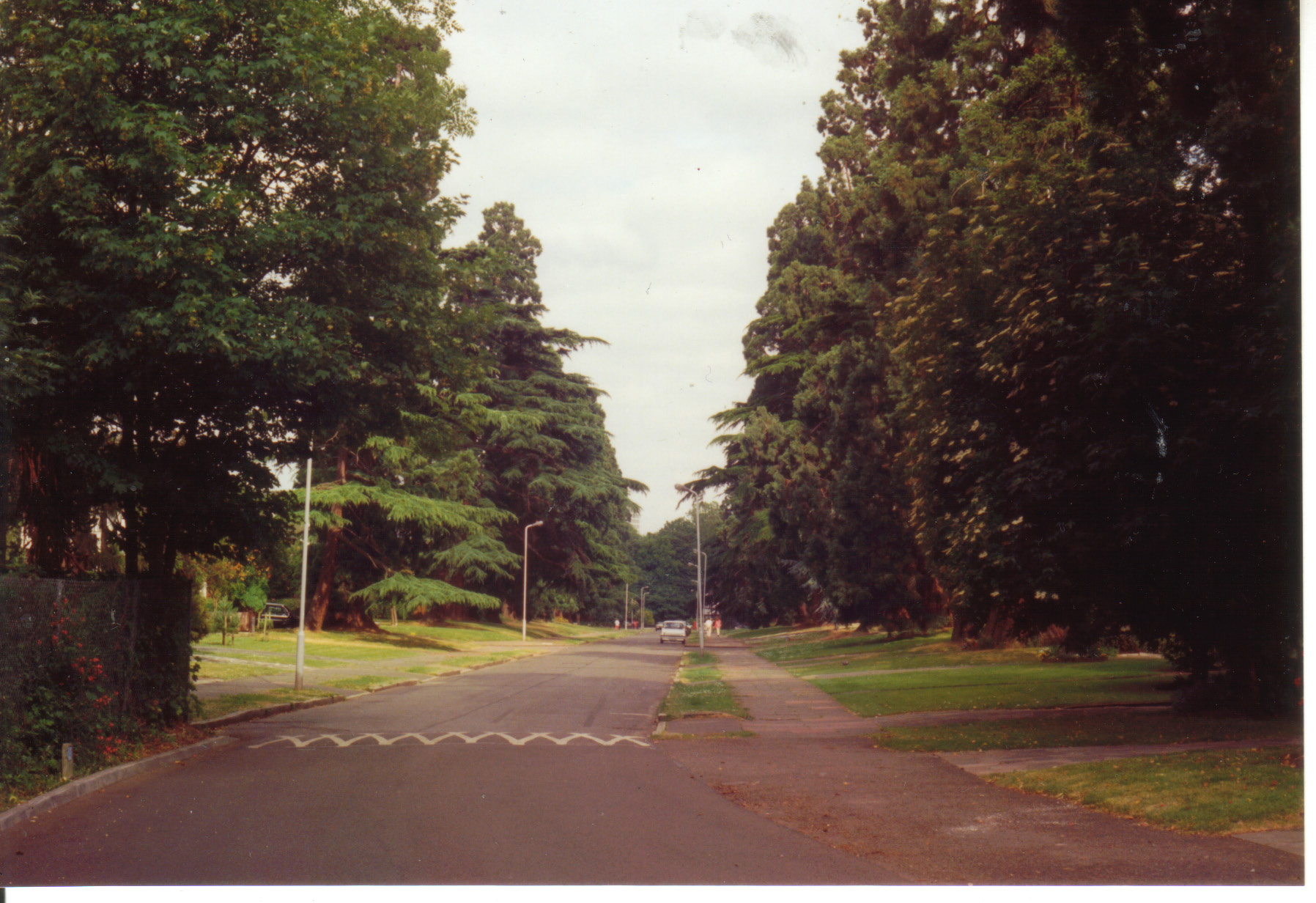
Canons Drive in the 1990s, showing Wellingtonia trees lining the drive

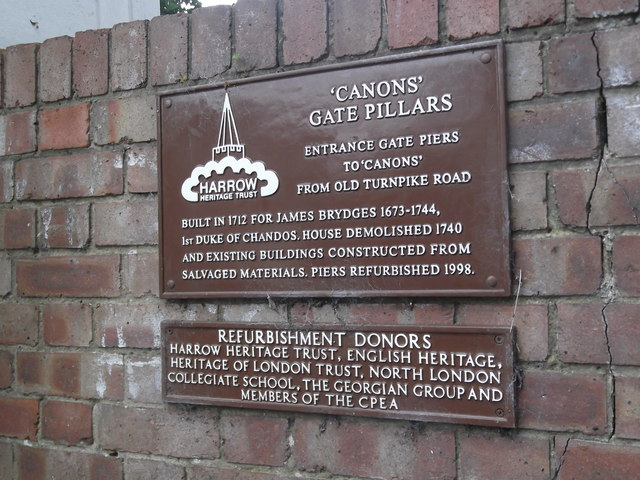
Commemorative sign at the start of Canons Drive, giving historical note

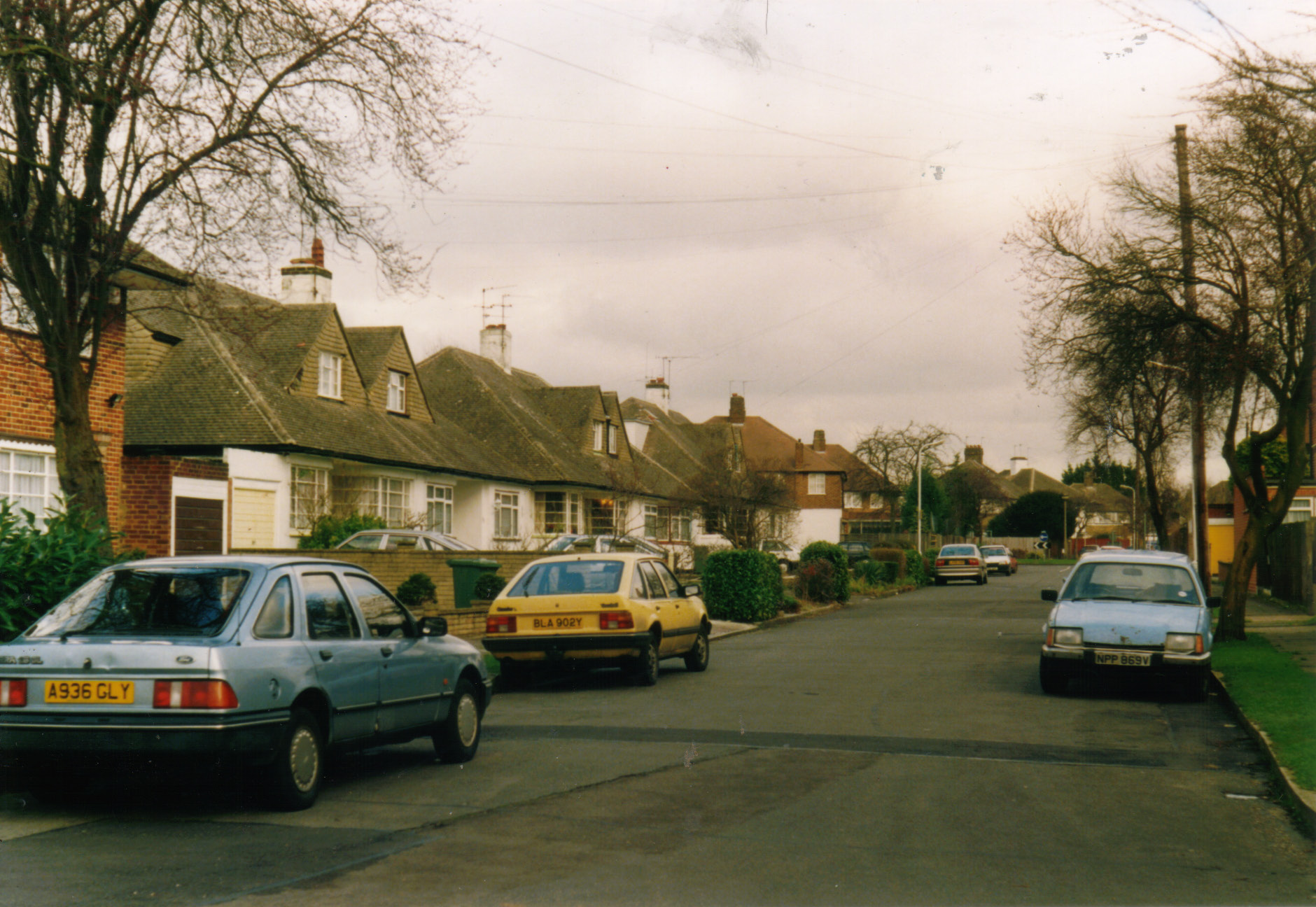
Houses in Cloyster Wood in Canons Park. Note: this is not part of the Canons Park Estate and is a residential street off Howberry Road, Canons Park

Arthur Du Cros purchased Canons in the 1890s.

== Politics ==
Canons Park is part of the Harrow East constituency for elections to the House of Commons of the United Kingdom.

Canons Park is part of the Canons ward for elections to Harrow London Borough Council.
