= Egerton-Barrett-Brydges baronets =

Extinct baronetcy in the Baronetage of the United Kingdom

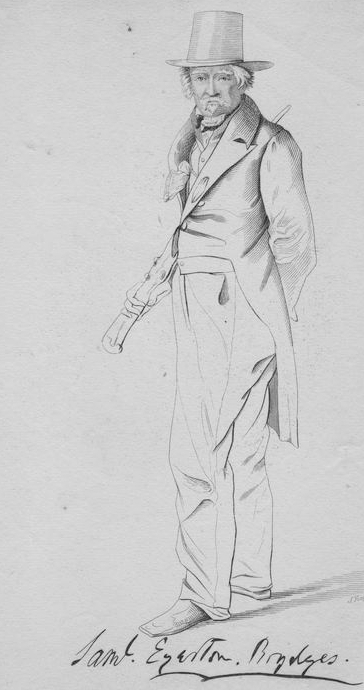
Sir Samuel Egerton Brydges, 1st Baronet

The Brydges, later Egerton-Barrett-Brydges Baronetcy, of Denton Court in the County of Kent, was a title in the Baronetage of the United Kingdom. It was created on 27 May 1815 for the bibliographer, genealogist and politician Samuel Egerton Brydges. He claimed the barony of Chandos (which had fallen into abeyance in 1789), initially on behalf of his older brother Reverend Edward Tymewell Brydges and then on his own behalf. The House of Lords rejected the claim in 1803, but Brydges nevertheless continued to style himself per legem terrae Baron Chandos of Sudeley. He was succeeded by his son, John, the second Baronet, who assumed the additional surname of Egerton and Barrett. The title became extinct on the latter's death in 1863.

Sir John William Head Brydges, brother of the first Baronet, was member of parliament for Armagh.

== Brydges, later Egerton-Barrett-Brydges baronets, of Denton Court (1815) ==
- Sir Samuel Egerton Brydges, 1st Baronet (1762–1837)
- Sir John William Egerton-Barrett-Brydges, 2nd Baronet (1791–1863)

== See also ==
- Baron Chandos

Baronetage of the United Kingdom
Preceded by Simeon baronets	Brydges baronets of Denton Hall; 30 May 1815	Succeeded by Preston baronets
