= Price baronets of the Priory (1657) =

The Price baronetcy, of the Priory, County of Brecon, was created in the Baronetage of England in October 1657 for Herbert Price, a courtier, member of the Short Parliament and Royalist. He was abroad at the time, returning to England after the death on 1658 of Henry Wilmot, 1st Earl of Rochester, and did not use the title until the Restoration of 1660.

The title became extinct upon the death of his son Thomas Arden Price c. 1689.

== Price baronets of the Priory (1657) ==
- Sir Herbert Price, 1st Baronet (c. 1605–1678)
- Thomas Arden Price, 2nd Baronet (1642–c. 1689)
