= Henry Brydges, 2nd Duke of Chandos =

British politician (1708–1771)

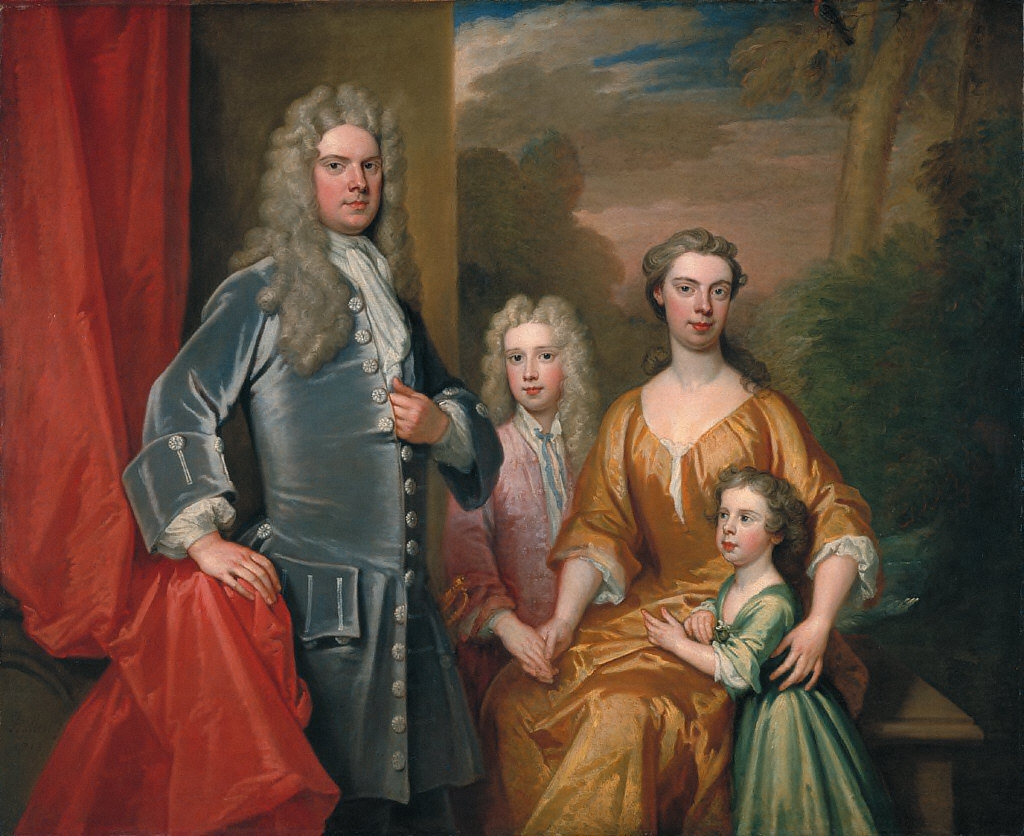
Henry Brydges (later 2nd Duke of Chandos) aged about five, pictured in 1713 with his father James Brydges (later 1st Duke of Chandos), his elder brother John (later Marquess of Carnarvon) and either his mother Mary (died 1712) or his stepmother Cassandra.

Henry Brydges, 2nd Duke of Chandos, KB (17 January 1708 – 28 November 1771), known from 1727 to 1744 by the courtesy title Marquess of Carnarvon, was the second son of the 1st Duke of Chandos and his first wife Mary Lake. He was the Member of Parliament for Hereford from 1727 to 1734, for Steyning between 1734 and 1741, and Bishop's Castle between 1741 and 1744.

== Career and titles ==
Henry Brydges was born the second son of the Hon. James Brydges, eldest son of the 8th Baron Chandos. He was educated at Westminster School and St John's College, Cambridge. On his father succeeding as 9th Baron Chandos in 1714 (and shortly thereafter being created Earl of Carnarvon), he became The Hon. Henry Brydges, and in 1719, on his father being created Duke of Chandos, he became Lord Henry Brydges. His elder brother died without male issue in 1727, at which point he became heir to the dukedom and acquired the courtesy title Marquess of Carnarvon.

From 1729 to 1735 Carnarvon was Master of the Horse to Frederick, Prince of Wales, and in 1732 was invested as a Knight of the Bath. On the death of his father, he succeeded as 2nd Duke of Chandos.

He was described by King George II as "a hot-headed, passionate, half-witted coxcomb".

== Financial problems ==
When his father died on 9 August 1744, the estate was heavily burdened by debt, the family having lost money in the South Sea Bubble. A decision was made to demolish the family seat, Cannons. In 1747 a twelve-day demolition sale saw both the contents and the very structure of the house itself sold piecemeal. The auction of the contents, beginning on 1 June 1767, and of the house and out-house materials, starting on 16 June, were each handled by the respected auctioneer Christopher Cock.

== Marriages and children ==
The Duke of Chandos, while staying at a small country inn, saw the ostler beating his wife in a most cruel manner; he interfered and literally bought her for half a crown. She was a young and pretty woman; the Duke had her educated; and on the husband's death he married her. On her death-bed, she had her whole household assembled, told them her history, and drew from it a touching moral of reliance on Providence; as from the most wretched situation, she had been suddenly raised to one of the greatest prosperity; she entreated their forgiveness if at any time she had given needless offence, and then dismissed them with gifts; dying almost in the very act.

— The Gentleman's Magazine (1832)

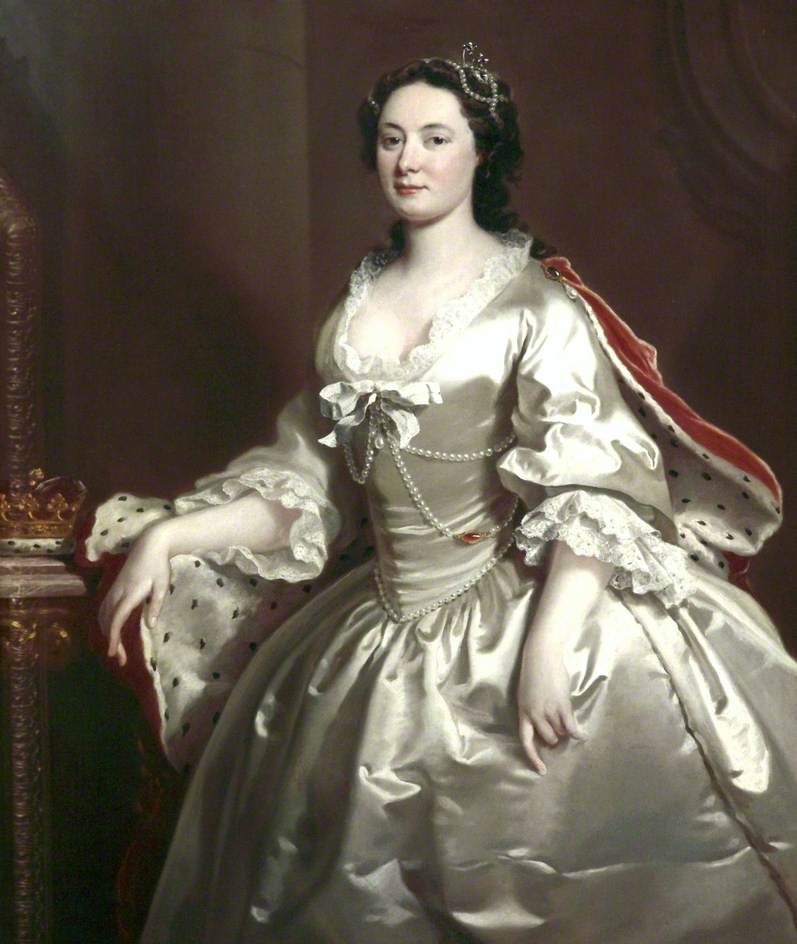
Anne, Duchess of Chandos (died 1759), by Joseph Highmore, in the Walker Art Gallery.

On 21 December 1728, he married Lady Mary Bruce (1710–1738), daughter of Charles Bruce, 4th Earl of Elgin and Lady Anne Saville. They had two children who survived childhood, Lady Caroline Brydges (20 March 1729–1789, grandmother of Chandos Leigh, 1st Baron Leigh) and James Brydges, 3rd Duke of Chandos (1731–1789) who were painted by Bartholomew Dandridge in 1738

The Duke's second marriage was unconventional. In 1744, he married Anne Wells, a former chambermaid from Newbury in Berkshire. They had met a few years earlier in circumstances described by a witness as follows:

The Duke of Chandos and a companion dined at the Pelican, Newbury, on the way to London. A stir in the Inn yard led to their being told that a man was going to sell his wife, and they are leading her up with a halter around her neck. They went to see. The Duke was smitten with her beauty and patient acquiescence in a process which would (as then supposed) free her from a harsh and ill-conditioned husband. He bought her, and subsequently married her (at Keith's Chapel) Christmas Day, 1744.

Anne died in 1759, without male issue, and Chandos married for a third time in 1767 to Elizabeth Major (1731–1813), daughter of Sir John Major, 1st Baronet.

Parliament of Great Britain
Preceded by Herbert Rudhale Westfaling; James Wallwyn	Member of Parliament for Hereford; 1727 – 1734; With: Thomas Geers	Succeeded by Thomas Foley; Sir John Morgan, Bt
Preceded by Thomas Bladen; The Viscount Vane	Member of Parliament for Steyning; 1734 – 1741; With: Robert Fagg 1734–1740; Hitch Younge 1740–1741	Succeeded by Charles Eversfield; Hitch Younge
Peerage of Great Britain
Preceded by James Brydges	Duke of Chandos; 1744–1771	Succeeded by James Brydges
