= Cassandra Willoughby, Duchess of Chandos =

English historian and garden restorer 1670–1735

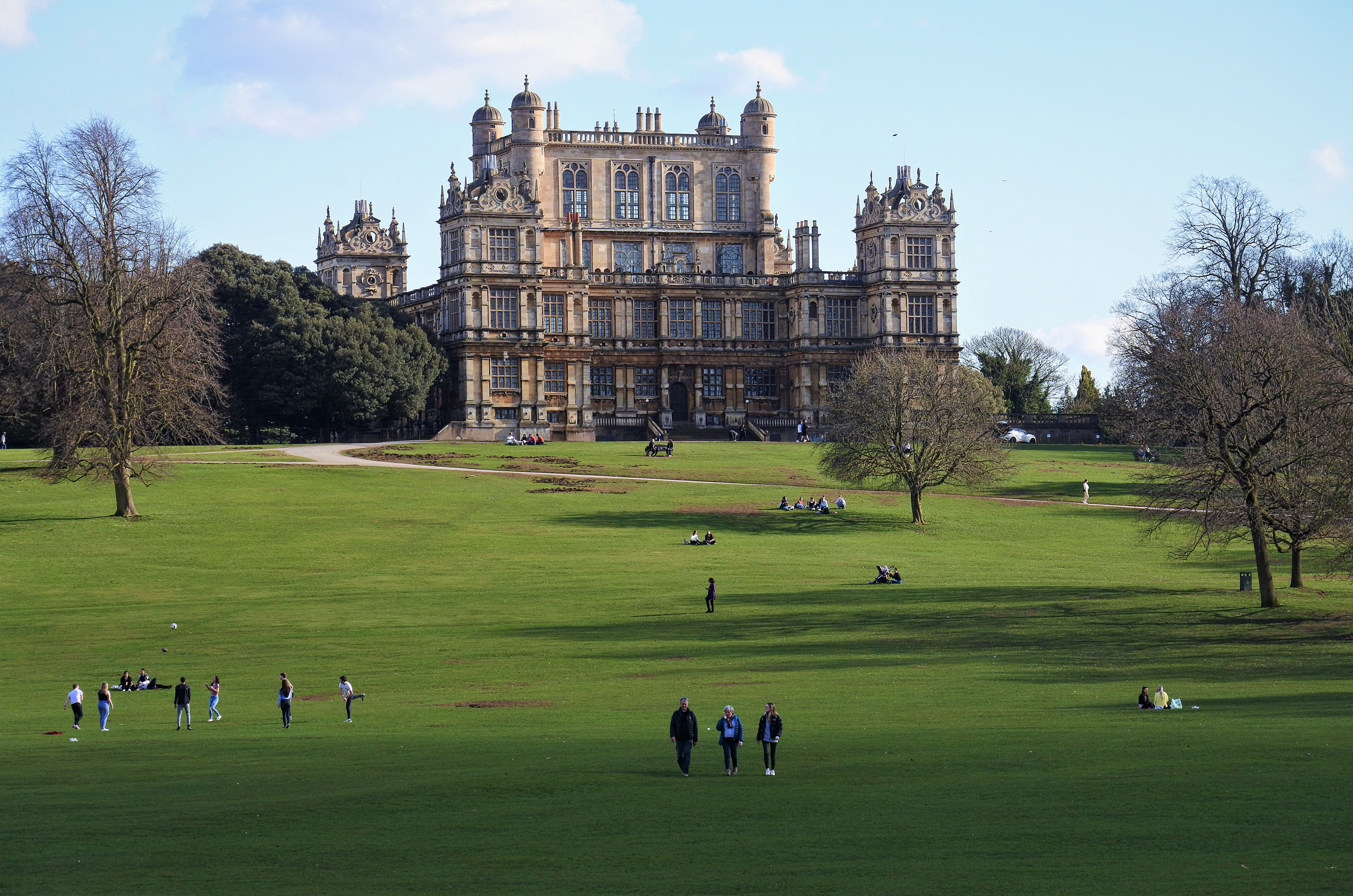
Wollaton Hall, family seat in Nottingham of Duchess Cassandra's family, the Willoughbys

Cassandra Willoughby, Duchess of Chandos (23 April 1670 – 16 July 1735) was an English historian, travel writer and artist. She spent more than a quarter-century overseeing the restoration of the gardens and rebuilding of the family mansion at Wollaton Hall, now in Nottingham, inherited by her father, Francis Willoughby.

== Biography ==
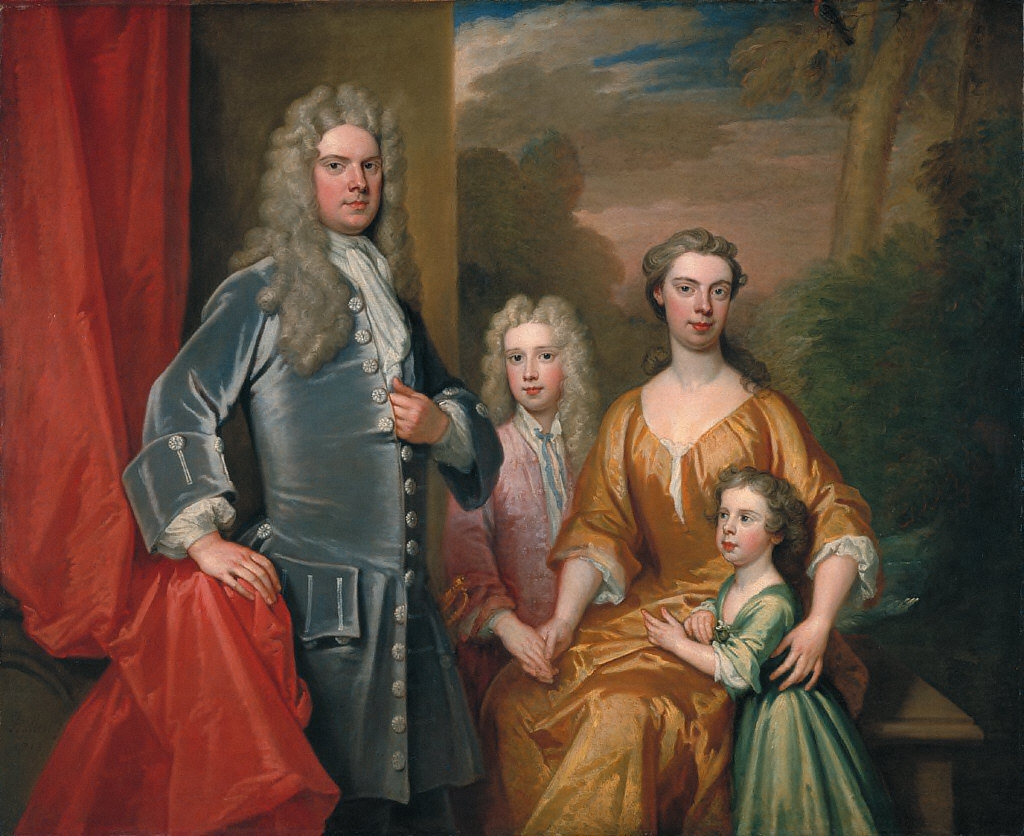
Kneller's 1713 portrait, Chandos family, believed to show Cassandra, rather than the Duke's first wife, mother of the two children in the picture.

She was the daughter of Francis Willoughby of Wollaton, Nottinghamshire, a Fellow of the Royal Society and writer on natural history, and his wife Emma, the daughter of Sir Henry Barnard of Bridgnorth, Shropshire and London. Her grandaunt, Elizabeth Weston, was the daughter of Sir Simon Weston, and niece of Chancellor David Yale.

When her 19-year-old brother Francis disagreed with his stepfather's handling of his finances, Cassandra accompanied him in 1687 to the Willoughby family's earlier seat, Wollaton Hall in Nottinghamshire: "This proposall [of her brother's] I was much delighted with, thinking it would be no small pleasure for me to be Mrs of Wollaton, and to doe whatever I had a mind to." She then oversaw restoration of the gardens and rebuilding of the house over a quarter of a century.

In 1713, at the age of 43, Cassandra married her rich cousin, James Brydges FRS, at Chelsea College Chapel as his second wife. Brydges' social standing rose the following year when he inherited a barony and baronetcy on the death of his father, 8th Baron Chandos of Sudeley. He was soon created Earl of Carnarvon and then in 1719 became Duke of Chandos and Cassandra his Duchess.

The National Gallery of Canada has a portrait of Cassandra and her husband by Sir Godfrey Kneller dated 1713. It also features the two sons of Brydges by his first wife.

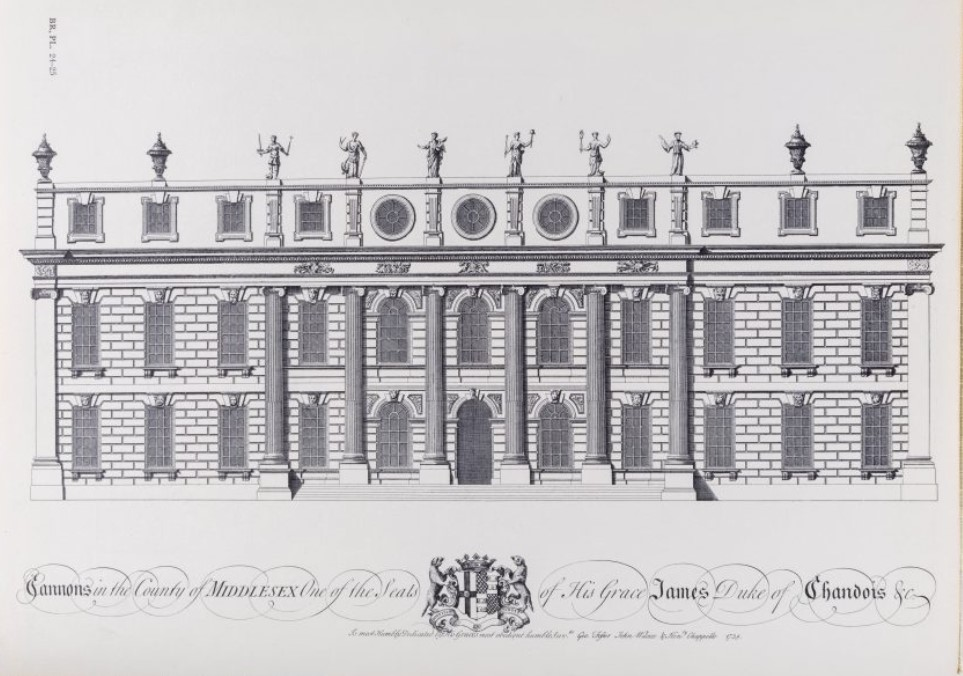
Their Cannons House estate in Middlesex, England, seat of the Duke of Chandos

Cassandra died childless at the age of 65 and was buried in the Chandos Mausoleum at St Lawrence's Church, Whitchurch, Little Stanmore, near the ducal seat of Cannons. Both the mother and sister of Jane Austen were named after Cassandra, to mark their link with a ducal family. Jane's mother was the granddaughter of the first Cassandra's sister-in-law, Mary Brydges, being the sister of her husband James Brydges, 1st Duke of Chandos.

Jane Austen was the author of Pride and Prejudice (1813) and Mansfield Park (1814). Her mother, Cassandra Austen, née Leigh, was the great-grandniece of the first Duke of Chandos (1673-1744) and Duchess Cassandra Willoughby.

John Willoughby is a character in her book Sense and Sensibility. Lord Middleton, also a character in Sense and Sensibility, was the name of Cassandra's brother, Thomas 1st Baron Middleton. The two surnames, being inspired by the Willoughby family.

== Writings ==
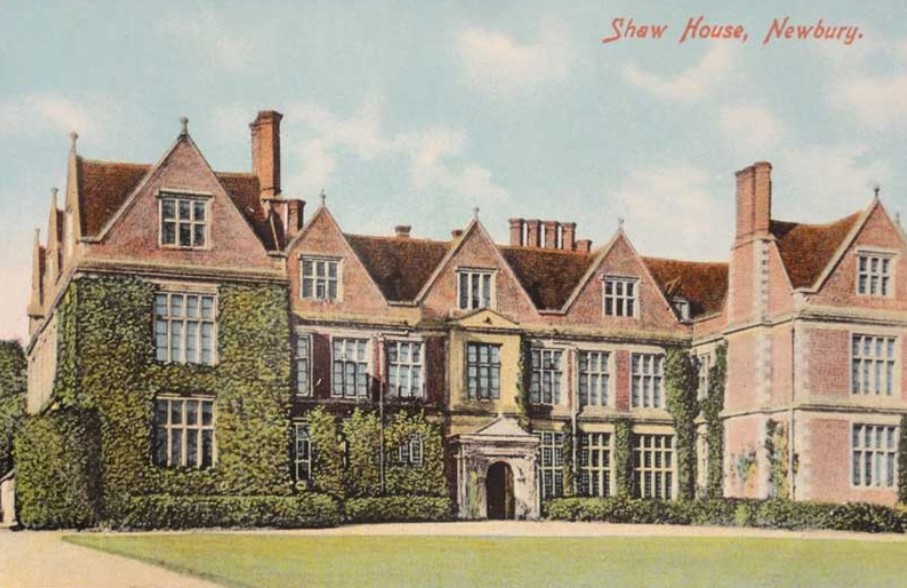
Shaw House, an estate of Cassandra and her husband, Duke James Brydges

Before she married, Cassandra Willoughby compiled a history of her father's family entitled The Continuation of the History of the Willoughby Family, to be found in the Manuscripts Department at the University of Nottingham Library.

Some of her correspondence from before and after her marriage is preserved at the Shakespeare Birthplace Trust Record Office, at the North London Collegiate School and the Huntington Library and Art Gallery, San Marino, California. In addition, she left some travel writings and genealogies.
