= Duke of Chandos =

Title in the Peerage of England

Dukedom of Chandos
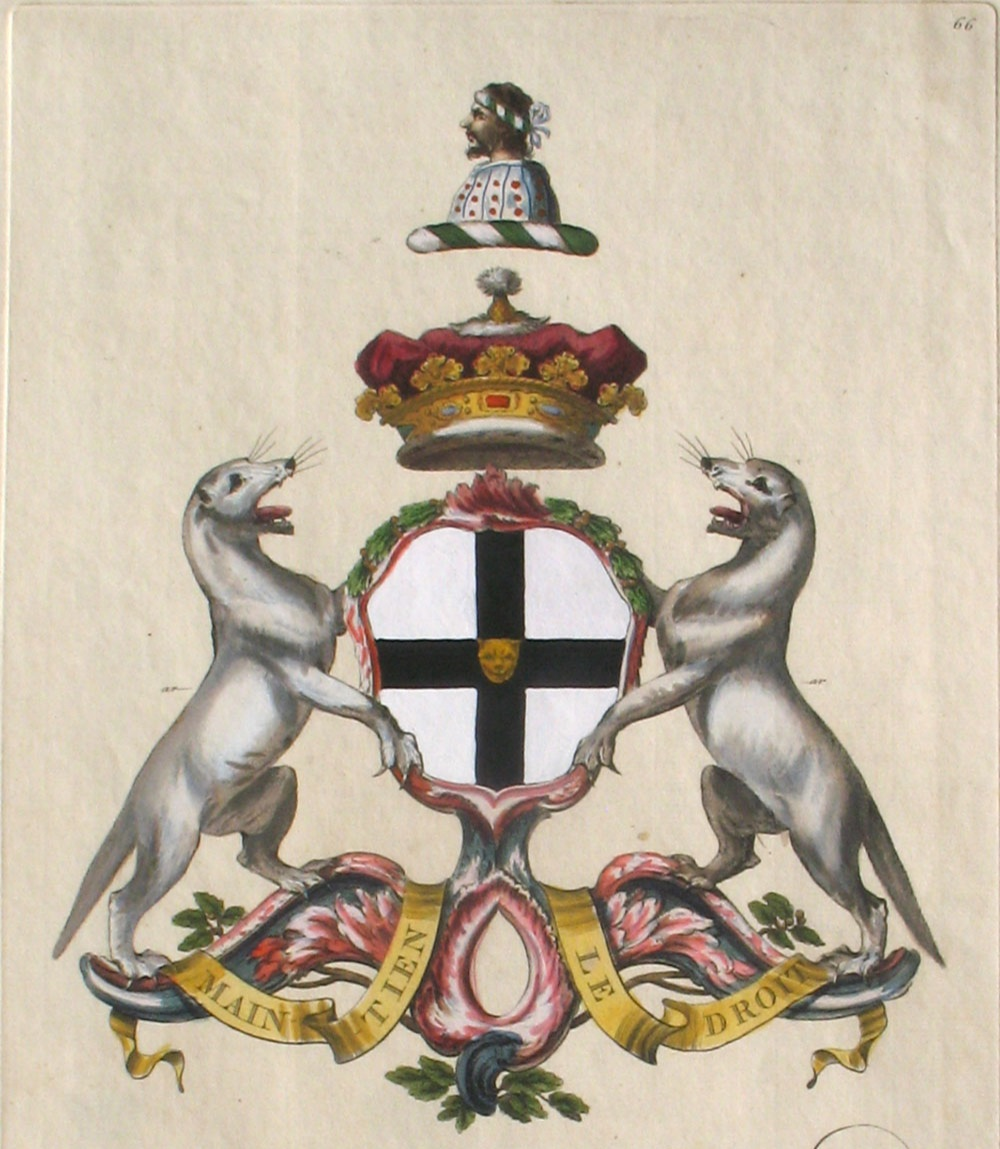
- Arms of Brydges, Dukes of Chandos
- Creation date: 1337 (first creation) 1554 (second creation) 1719 (elevation to dukedom)
- Created by: Edward III (first creation Mary I (second creation George I (elevation)
- Peerage: Peerage of England
- First holder: Roger de Chandos, 1st Baron Chandos
- Last holder: James Brydges, 3rd Duke of Chandos
- Subsidiary titles: Marquess of Carnarvon Marquess of Chandos Viscount Wilton Baron Chandos of Sudeley Lord of Kinloss
- Extinction date: 1789
- Former seats: Sudeley Castle, Gloucestershire Cannons House, Middlesex Chandos House, London
- Motto: "maintien le droit" (uphold the right)

The Dukedom of Chandos /ˈʃænˌdɒs, ˈʃɑːnˌdɒs/ was a title in the Peerage of Great Britain, named for a fief in Normandy. The Chandos peerage was first created as a barony by Edward III in 1337; its second creation in 1554 was due to the Brydges family's service to Mary I during Wyatt's rebellion, when she also gave them Sudeley Castle. The 9th Baron of the second creation was elevated to the dukedom in 1719, but after his grandson's death without male heirs, his titles all became extinct (the 1337 creation having previously become abeyant in 1602 upon the death of the 3rd Baron of the second creation without male issue).

== History ==
A Robert de Chandos went to Ireland with King John in 1185. His son Roger in 1221 received licence to hold a fair at Fownhope in 1221. The son of this Roger, another Robert de Chandos (d. 1302), participated in the Welsh expedition of Edward I. The son of Robert, Roger de Chandos, served in the Scottish wars of Edward II and received a knighthood. In 1321, he was sheriff of Herefordshire. He was succeeded by Thomas de Chandos.

Thomas was succeeded by his brother Roger de Chandos (Rogerus de Chaundos). Roger was made a knight banneret by Edward III. It was this Roger who was summoned to Parliament, and who was cited as Baron de Chandos between 1337 (11th year of Edward III) and 1355, counting as the first creation of the title. Roger was succeeded by his son Thomas, who was in turn succeeded by his son John. Neither of these was summoned to Parliament, and is thus not named Baron Chandos explicitly, but counted as de jure 2nd and 3rd Barons Chandos, respectively. John, who defended Hereford Castle against Owain Glyndŵr in 1403, died without issue in 1428. The Chandos estates in Herefordshire passed to the surviving daughter of John's sister Elizabeth, wife of Nicholas Mattesden, and eventually to his great nephew Giles Brugge, de jure 4th Baron Chandos (son of Edward Brugge and Alice de Berkeley, whose mother was Margaret de Chandos). He became father to Thomas Brugge, 5th Baron Chandos (d. 1493). Thomas' son, Giles Brugge, 6th Baron Chandos (d. 1511), held the office of High Sheriff of Gloucestershire for 1499.

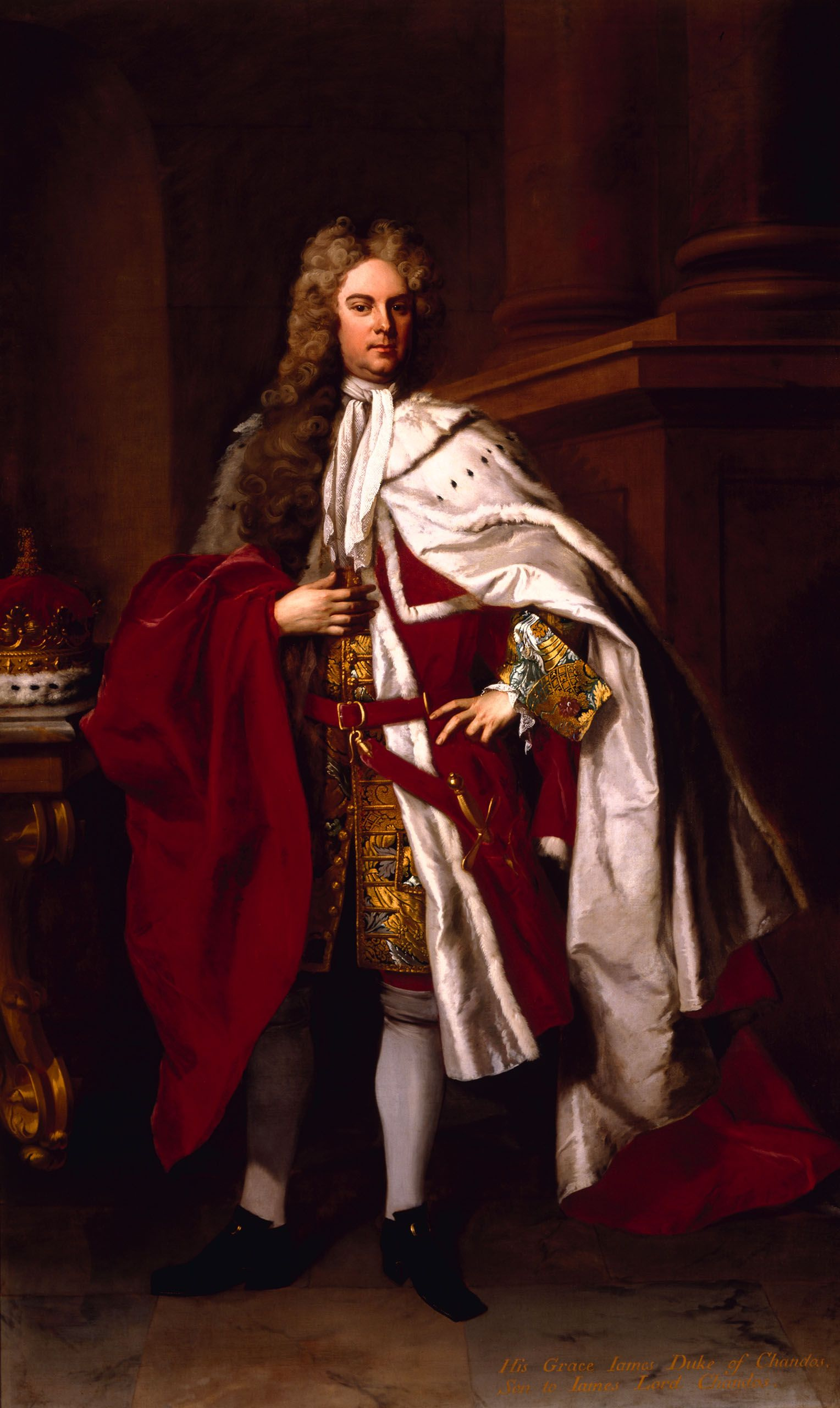
A portrait of the 1st Duke of Chandos by Michael Dahl

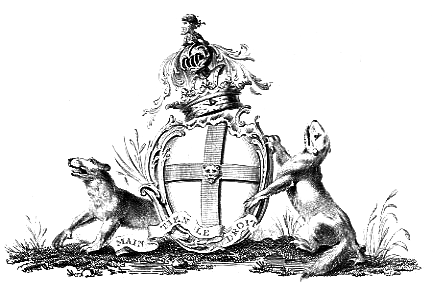
Arms of Brydges, Dukes of Chandos: Argent, on a cross sable a leopard's face Or

The son of Giles Brugge, John Brydges (d. 1557), was summoned to Parliament for Gloucestershire at some point before 1554. In 1554, he was given Sudeley Castle and created Baron Chandos, of Sudeley in the county of Gloucester, by Queen Mary I, in the second creation of the title.

The three succeeding barons were all Members of Parliament and persons of some importance—particularly Grey, 5th Baron, and his elder son George, 6th Baron. George had six daughters but no sons, and after the death of his brother William in 1676 the barony came to a kinsman, Sir James Brydges, Bart., who was English ambassador to Constantinople from 1680 to 1685.

The eighth baron's eldest son, James Brydges (1674–1744), succeeded his father as ninth Baron Chandos in 1714. In the same year, he was created Earl of Carnarvon (second creation) and Duke of Chandos in 1719. Subsidiary titles included Marquess of Carnarvon (1719) and Viscount Wilton (1714). All of these titles were in the Peerage of Great Britain.

The 1st Duke built an exceptionally grand country house called Cannons in Little Stanmore, Middlesex, that, though it was parodied in his lifetime, was a seat of great learning and culture: Handel was the resident composer from 1717 until 1719. Brydges' Cannons was demolished after his death, to pay the debts he incurred in the South Sea Bubble disaster, and by his son. It was replaced by a modest villa built by William Hallett, and Cannons is now occupied by North London Collegiate School, whose archives contain some information on the duke, his second wife Cassandra Willoughby, and subsequent owners of Cannons. Author Jane Austen was descended from his sister Mary.

With the death of the third duke in 1789, the titles became extinct, and the barony became dormant. An attempt was made by Samuel Egerton Brydges to claim the barony, initially on behalf of his older brother Edward Tymewell Brydges and then on his own behalf. Litigation lasted from 1790 to 1803 before the claims were rejected, but Egerton Brydges continued to style himself per legem terrae Baron Chandos of Sudeley. It seems likely that not only was the claim groundless but that the evidence was forged.

== List of title holders ==
=== Barons Chandos, first creation (1337) ===
The title is spelt 'Chaundos' in the Complete Peerage.

- Roger de Chandos, 1st Baron Chandos (d. 1353) was probably 1st Lord Chandos.
- Thomas Chandos, 2nd Baron Chandos (c. 1333–1375) (claimant)
- John Chandos, 3rd Baron Chandos (c. 1349–1428) (claimant) (peerage abeyant 1428)
- Giles Brugge, 4th Baron Chandos (1396–1467) (abeyance terminated 1458, on the death of his cousin)
- Thomas Brugge, 5th Baron Chandos de jure (1427–30 January 1493)
- Giles Brugge, 6th Baron Chandos (c. 1462–1 December 1511)

Most sources read that the title became extinct upon the death of the 1st Lord, although others, such as the Complete Peerage, include the further holders listed above. The presumed 2nd Lord Chandos was High Sheriff of Herefordshire for 1359, 1370 and 1372 and the presumed 3rd Lord Chandos served the same office for 1382.

=== Barons Chandos, second creation (1554) ===
- John Brydges, 1st Baron Chandos (1492–1557) is sometimes listed as de jure 7th Lord Chandos of the 1337 creation Son of 6th Baron of the preceding creation.
- Edmund Brydges, 2nd Baron Chandos (bef. 1522–1573) eldest son of the 1st Baron
- Giles Brydges, 3rd Baron Chandos (1548–1594), elder son of the 2nd Baron, died without male issue
- William Brydges, 4th Baron Chandos (c. 1552–1602), younger son of the 2nd Baron
- Grey Brydges, 5th Baron Chandos (c. 1581–1621), only son of the 4th Baron
- George Brydges, 6th Baron Chandos (1620–1655), elder son of the 5th Baron, died without male issue
- William Brydges, 7th Baron Chandos (d. 1676), younger son of the 5th Baron, died without male issue
- James Brydges, 8th Baron Chandos (1642–1714), great-great-grandson of the 1st Baron
- James Brydges, 9th Baron Chandos (1673–1744; created Earl of Carnarvon in 1714 and Duke of Chandos in 1719)

=== Dukes of Chandos (1719) ===
- James Brydges, 1st Duke of Chandos (1673–1744), eldest son of the 8th Baron
  - John Brydges, Marquess of Carnarvon (1703–1727), elder son of the 1st Duke, died without male issue
- Henry Brydges, 2nd Duke of Chandos (1708–1771), younger son of the 1st Duke
- James Brydges, 3rd Duke of Chandos (1731–1789), only son of the 2nd Duke, died without male issue. His titles, other than the Lordship of Kinloss, became extinct.

The 3rd Duke's son-in-law, the 2nd Marquess of Buckingham, was created Duke of Buckingham and Chandos in 1822.

== Family tree ==
Family tree of Dukes of Chandos

Baron Chandos (or Chaundos, 1st creation), 1337
Roger de Chandos d. 1353; 1st Lord Chandos
Barony Chandos (1st creation) possibly extinct, 1353
Thomas Chandos c. 1333–1375; 2nd Lord Chandos de jure High Sheriff of Herefordshire
Elizabeth Chandos	John Chandos c. 1349–1428; 3rd Lord Chandos de jure High Sheriff of Herefordshire
Barony of Chandos abeyant, 1428
Alice de Berkeley a. 1379–1414	Margaret de Chandos
Barony of Chandos abeyance terminated, 1458
Giles Brugge; 1396–1467; 4th Lord Chandos de jure
Thomas Brugge a. 1427–1492/93; 5th Lord Chandos de jure
Giles Brugge c. 1462–1511; 6th Lord Chandos de jure
Baron Chandos (2nd creation), 1554
John Brydges; 1492–1557; 7th Lord Chandos de jure, 1st Baron Chandos
Edmund Brydges a. 1522–1573; 8th Lord Chandos de jure, 2nd Baron Chandos	Charles Brydes; 1528–1619
Baronet Brydges, of Wilton, 1627
Giles Brydges; 1548–1594; 9th Lord Chandos de jure, 3rd Baron Chandos	William Brydges c. 1552–1602; 10th Lord Chandos de jure, 4th Baron Chandos	Giles Brydges c. 1573–1637; 1st Baronet
Grey Brydges c. 1581–1621; 11th Lord Chandos de jure, 5th Baron Chandos	John Brydges; 1623–1652; 2nd Baronet
George Brydges; 1620–1655; 12th Lord Chandos de jure, 6th Baron Chandos	William Brydges d. 1676; 13th Lord Chandos de jure, 7th Baron Chandos	James Brydges; 1642–1714; 14th Lord Chandos de jure, 8th Baron Chandos, 3rd Baronet
Earl of Carnarvon (2nd creation) and Viscount Wilton, 1714; Duke of Chandos and Marquess of Carnarvon, 1719
James Brydges; 1673–1744; 1st Duke of Chandos, etc., 15th Lord Chandos de jure, 9th Baron Chandos, 4th Baronet
John Brydges; 1703–1727 styled Marquess of Carnarvon	Henry Brydges; 1708–1771; 2nd Duke of Chandos, etc., 16th Lord Chandos de jure, 10th Baron Chandos, 5th Baronet
James Brydges; 1731–1789; 3rd Duke of Chandos, etc., 17th Lord Chandos de jure, 10th Baron Chandos, 7th Lord Kinloss de jure, 5th Baronet
All titles except lordship Kinloss extinct, 1789

== See also ==
- Duke of Buckingham and Chandos
- Viscount Chandos
- John Chandos Knight, supported Edward the Black Prince, d 1369
