= John Brydges, Marquess of Carnarvon =

John Brydges, Marquess of Carnarvon (15 January 1703 – 7 April 1727), styled Viscount Wilton from 1714 to 1719, was an English Member of the British Parliament, heir apparent to the Duke of Chandos.

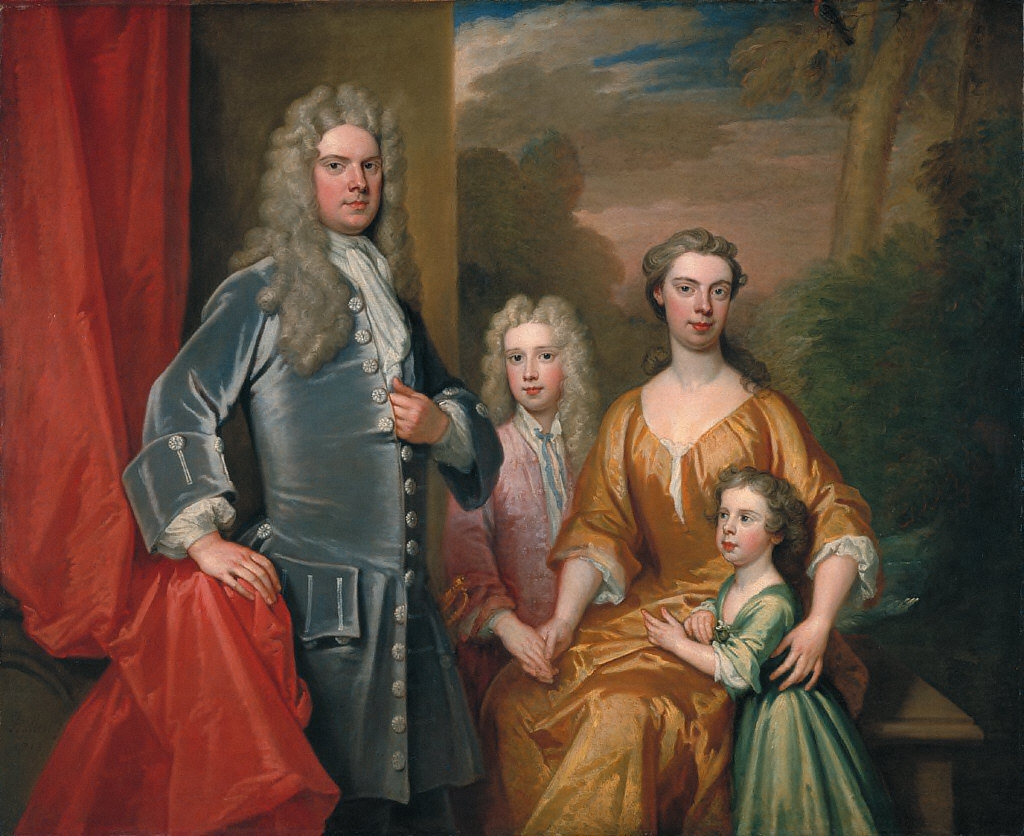
John Brydges as a child with his father and younger brother. The lady in the family portrait is either his mother Mary (died 1712) or his stepmother Cassandra.

John was the fourth, but eldest surviving son of James Brydges, 1st Duke of Chandos and his first wife Mary. He was educated at Westminster School, from which he graduated in 1718. Viscount Wilton, as he then was, matriculated at University of Oxford on 4 November 1719, from which he received a Doctor of Civil Law on 8 April 1721. He also studied at Leyden that year. Carnarvon completed his education with a Grand Tour of Europe from 1721 to 1723.

After his return to England, he married Lady Catherine Tollemache, daughter of Lionel Tollemache, 3rd Earl of Dysart, on 1 September 1724. The couple had two children:

- Lady Catherine Brydges (17 December 1725 – 16 May 1807), married first Capt. William Berkeley Lyon and second Edwyn Francis Stanhope, by the latter of whom she was mother of Sir Henry Edwyn Stanhope, 1st Baronet
- Lady Jane Brydges (28 April 1727 – 1 March 1776), married James Brydges of Pinner, without issue

Carnarvon was returned on his father's electoral interest for the constituency of Steyning in January 1726, at a by-election following the death of John Pepper MP. However, he died in April 1727 of smallpox. His place was filled by William Stanhope, lately Ambassador to Spain.

Parliament of Great Britain
Preceded by John Pepper; John Gumley	Member of Parliament for Steyning; 1726–1727; With: John Gumley	Succeeded by John Gumley; William Stanhope
