= Price baronets of Trengwainton (1815) =

The Price baronetcy, of Trengwainton in the County of Cornwall, was created in the Baronetage of the United Kingdom on 30 May 1815 for Rose Price. He was the grandson of John Price, younger brother of the 1st Baronet of the 1768 creation; and owned the Worthy Park sugar estate in Jamaica.

== Price baronets of Trengwainton (1815) ==
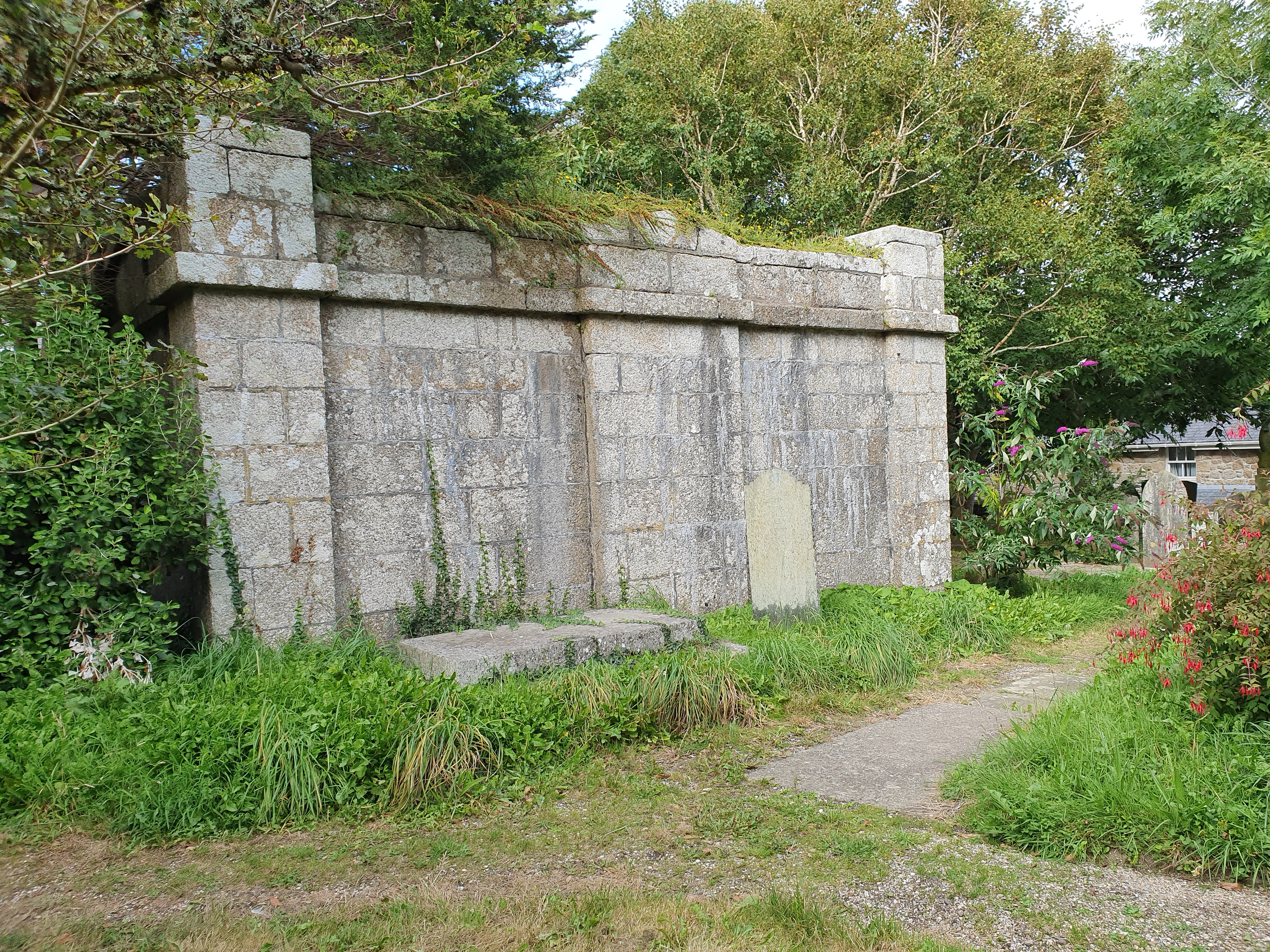
Rose Price Mausoleum, Madron Churchyard

- Sir Rose Price, 1st Baronet (1768–1834)
- Sir Charles Dutton Price, 2nd Baronet (1800–1872), died unmarried.
- Sir Rose Lambart Price, 3rd Baronet (1837–1899)
- Sir Rose Price, 4th Baronet (1878–1901)
- Sir Francis Caradoc Rose Price, 5th Baronet (1880–1949)
- Sir Rose Francis Price, 6th Baronet (1910–1979)
- Sir Francis Caradoc Rose Price, 7th Baronet, KC (born 1950)

The heir presumptive to the baronetcy is his nephew Benjamin William Rose Price (born 1989).

== Extended family ==
Henry Talbot Price, younger brother of the 3rd Baronet, was a captain in the Royal Navy. John Giles Price, fourth son of the 1st Baronet, was a magistrate and penal administrator: whose eldest son Sir John Frederick Price KCSI was a Madras Legislative representative; and whose third son was Col. Thomas Caradoc Rose Price. The latter's son Thomas Rose Price (1875–1949) was a brigadier-general whose younger son was the actor Dennis Price.

== Notes ==
Baronetage of the United Kingdom
Preceded by Preston baronets	Price baronets of Trengwainton; 30 May 1815	Succeeded by Waller baronets
