= Giles Brugge, 6th Baron Chandos =

English courtier and soldier

Giles Brugge or Brydges (c. 1462 – 1 December 1511) was an English courtier and soldier.

== Career ==
He was born in Coberley, Gloucester, England. The son of Thomas Brugge, 5th Baron Chandos, and Florence Darrell. Giles took part in the Battle of Blackheath on 22 June 1497 from which he was knighted for valour. He married Isabel Baynham, daughter of Thomas Baynham and Alice Walwyn. He held the office of High Sheriff of Gloucestershire for 1499. (Note: Sir John appears as Sir John Bruges, Knight, Lord Chandos of Sudeley in his will (Public Records Office – prob 11/39). The family name originated as Brugge but the Latin or anglicized version Bruges was used. For some reason members of the family at various points in history took derivatives such as Brydges or Bridges or less commonly Burges. Despite having adopted a variant, the name Bruges randomly appears in several branches of the family. Giles Brugge and his father Thomas also used the variant Bruges. When the name Bruges is found, the ancestry is invariably common.)

In August 1502, Elizabeth of York travelled through Gloucestershire. Two of the grooms of her chamber carried her jewels, passing by Coberley, and in September she sent a messenger to "Sir Giles Brigges".

He made his will on 19 November 1511 and it was proved on 18 February 1512.

== Children ==
The children of Giles and Isabel included: (Note: Florence Brydges is also a daughter of Giles and Isabel born 1493. So is Anne Brugge, Ursula Brydges and Richard Brydges. 8 Children in all.)

1. Sir John Brydges, 1st Baron Chandos of Sudeley (9 March 1491/2 – 12 April 1557) married Elizabeth Grey
2. Thomas Brydges/ Brugge of Coberley and Cornbury and Keynsham Abbey, Sheriff of Gloucestershire, then of Berkshire and Oxfordshire (died 14 November 1559)
3. William Brugge (mentioned in his will). Inherited his father's lands in Brakenborowe and Horton. He is probably the William Bridges brother of Sir John Bridges who married about 1538 Anne the daughter of William Barker of Chiswick. The legality of this marriage was challenged by Symone Cornethwaite who was living with Lord Russell.
4. Catherine Brugge (d.1556) who married (1) Leonard Poole (d.1538) of Saperton who was gentleman usher to the king and (2) Sir David Brooke of Horton (d.1559)
5. Florence Brugge (1493 - 1539) married Sir William Morgan (Knight).
