= Thomas Brugge, 5th Baron Chandos =

English noble

Thomas Brugge, de jure 5th Baron Chandos (1427 – 30 January 1493), was an English peer.

== Origins ==
Thomas Brugge was born in Coberley, Gloucestershire, England son of Giles Brugge, 4th Baron Chandos and Catherine Clifford, daughter of James Clifford of Frampton-on-Severn, Gloucestershire and widow of Anselm Guise. Brugge's great-grandmother, Isabel, was the daughter of Sir Piers Grandison.

== Career ==
Brugge was Knight of the Shire (MP) for Gloucestershire in 1460 and for Herefordshire in 1472. He succeeded to the title of 5th Lord Chandos on 13 April 1467, de jure, on the death of his father.

== Marriages and family ==
Brugge's first marriage was to Margaret Banaster, from which there was no issue. He remarried in 1458 to Florence, the daughter of William Darrell of Littlecote House in Wiltshire by his wife, Elizabeth, the daughter of Thomas Calston. Thomas and Florence had at least eight children:

1. Elizabeth Brugge (c. 1459 – 26 January 1535), married (1) William Cassey (2) Walter Rowdon. There is a commemorative memorial brass plaque on the floor of Eldersfield church.
2. Alice Brugge (born c. 1460), married to Thomas William Chicheley.
3. Giles Brugge, 6th Baron Chandos (c. 1462/63 – 1 December 1511), married to Isabel Baynham.
4. Eleanor Brugge (born c. 1463), married to Thomas Pauncefoot as his third wife.
5. Jane Brugge (born c. 1466).
6. Henry Brugge (born c. 1470), Esq., of Newbury, Berkshire, Faulstone, Ludgershall, and Salisbury, Wiltshire, Burgess (MP) for Ludgershall, Wiltshire, and Gentleman Usher to King Henry VIII. Henry 'Bruges' made a will dated 5 December 1538, probated in London on 28 January 1539. Henry married circa 1500, Margery Buckerd the daughter of William Buckerd as shown in the Visitation of Wiltshire 1565. Margery was the widow of clothier Nicholas Bedford of Newbury. Henry was bequeathed £10 in 1509 by Margery's son, John Bedford of Poole. Henry mentions in his will his other step-son, Robert Bedford, and his cousin, Anne the daughter of Constantine Darrell. Henry was succeeded by his son Sir Richard Brydges (Bruges or Bridges) of Great Shefford in Berkshire and Ludgershall in Wiltshire. Henry had a daughter Joan who married firstly John Giffard of Itchell Manor at Crondall in Hampshire and secondly William Thornhill of Thornhill in Dorset; Joane died 1557 at Thornhill. In 1520 and 1530 Henry Bruges was High Sheriff of Berkshire. Henry Brugge should not be confused with his kinsman Harry Bridges (d. 14 April 1579) who married as her first husband Anne Hungerford, the daughter of Sir John Hungerford (d. 9 March 1582) of Down Ampney, Gloucestershire.
7. Thomas Brugge (born c. 1471 - 1511). Frank A. Gooch asserts had daughter Isabelle Bridges who married, 21 May 1522, Peter Gooch seized of lands in Suffolk and had 9 children including the male-line ancestor of the Gooch baronets.
8. Anne Brugge (Bruges or Brydges, born c. 1473) married (1) William Reade (d.10 August 1508) of Deerhurst, Gloucestershire and (2) Henry Pole [Poole]. William and Anne had son and heir William Reade of Boddington.
