= James Brydges, 1st Duke of Chandos =

British landowner and politician (1673–1744)

His Grace The Duke of Chandos PC DL FRS
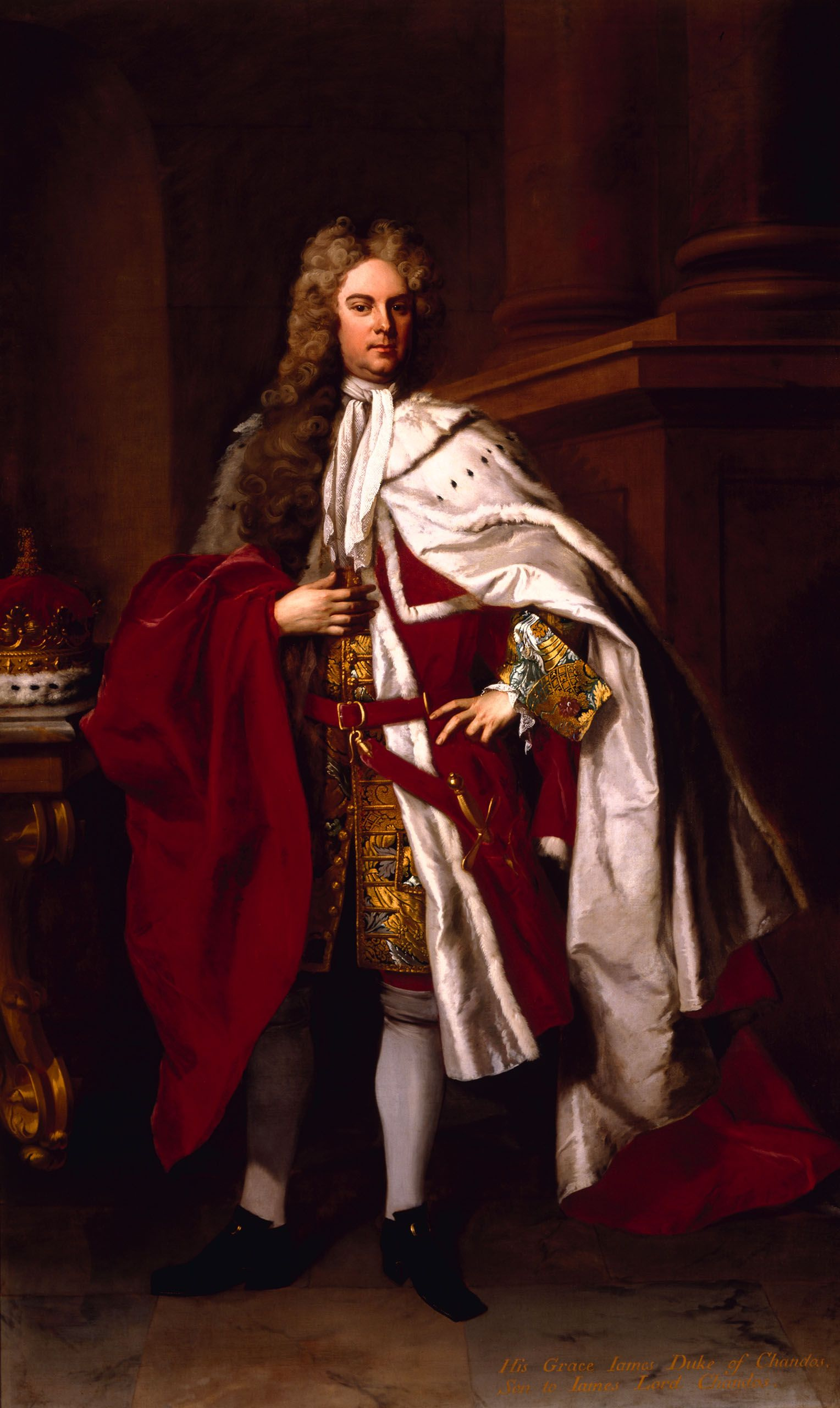
- Portrait by Michael Dahl, c. 1719

Member of Parliament for Hereford
- In office 1707–1714
- Preceded by: Constituency established
- Succeeded by: The Viscount Scudamore

Personal details
- Born: 6 January 1673 Herefordshire, England
- Died: 9 August 1744 (aged 71) Little Stanmore, Middlesex, England
- Spouses: Mary Lake (m. 1695; died 1712) Cassandra Willoughby (m. 1713; died 1735) Lydia Catherine van Hatten Davall (m. 1736)
- Children: John Brydges, Marquess of Carnarvon; Henry Brydges, 2nd Duke of Chandos
- Education: New College, Oxford

James Brydges, 1st Duke of Chandos, PC, DL, FRS (6 January 1673 – 9 August 1744) was a British landowner and politician who represented Hereford in the English and British House of Commons from 1698 until 1714, when he succeeded to his father's peerage as Baron Chandos and started sitting in the House of Lords. He was subsequently created Earl of Carnarvon, and then Duke of Chandos in 1719.

== Early life ==
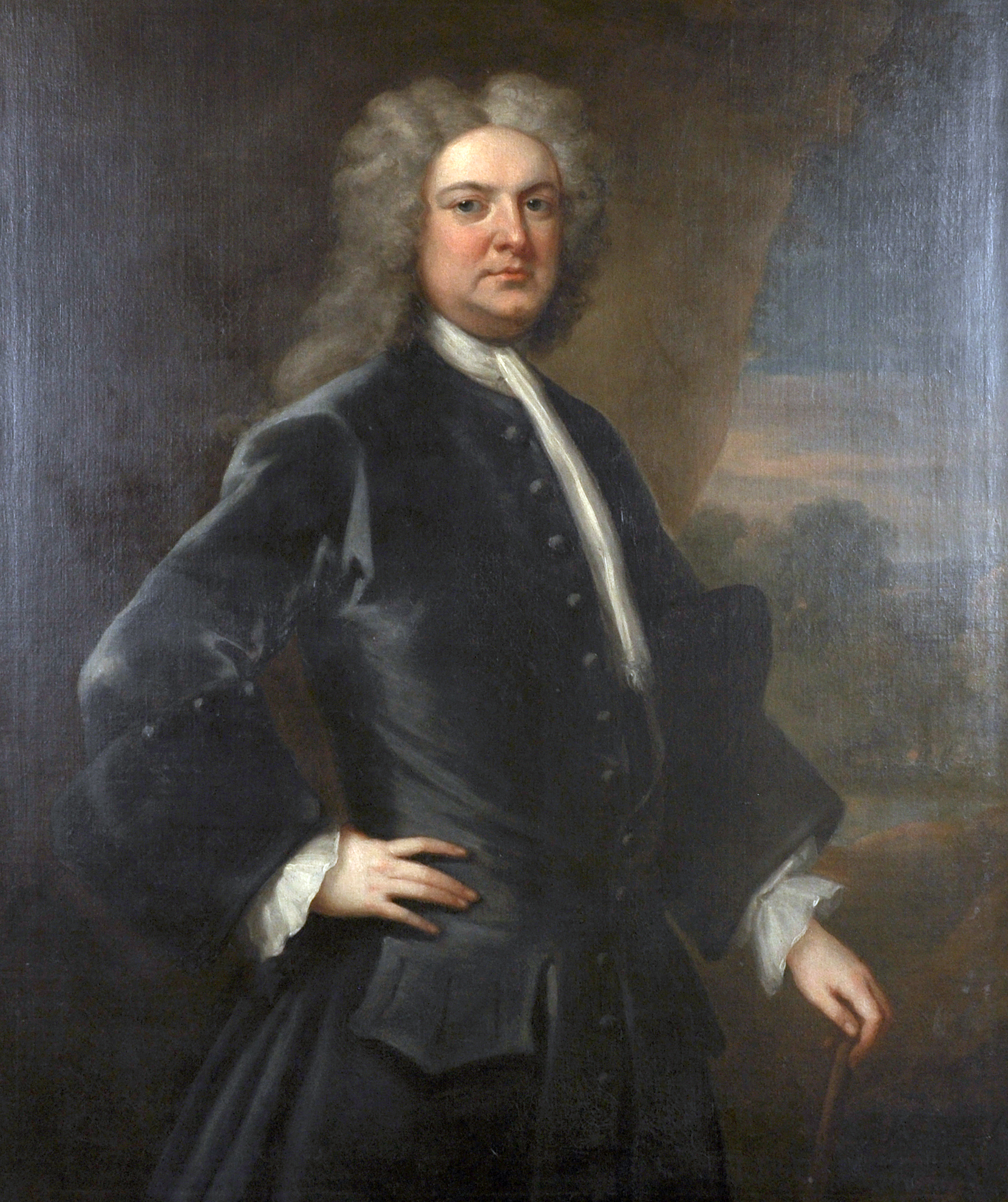
1722 portrait of Chandos by John Vanderbank showing the newly constructed great basin at Cannons in the background.

Brydges was born on the 6 January 1673 at Dewsall, Herefordshire, the fourth, but eldest surviving son of James Brydges, 8th Baron Chandos and his wife Elizabeth Barnard, daughter of Sir Henry Barnard, merchant of St Dunstan-in-the-East, London, and of Bridgnorth, Shropshire. He was educated at Westminster School in 1686, and at New College, Oxford, from 1690 to 1692. He was at the Wolfenbüttel academy from 1692 to 1694 and in 1694 he was elected to the Royal Society.

Henry Bridges, chaplain to Queen Anne and later Archdeacon of Rochester, was his younger brother.

== Political career ==
Brydges was a Freeman of Ludlow in 1697, and was returned unopposed as Member of Parliament for Hereford at the 1698 English general election. In 1700 he was a member of the Old East India Company. He was returned as MP for Hereford in contests at the two general elections of 1701 and unopposed at the 1702 English general election. From 1702 to 1703 he was Commissioner of public accounts and was a member of the council of the Lord High Admiral from 1703 to April 1705. He was returned unopposed at Hereford again at the 1705 English general election. From April 1705 Brydges was paymaster-general of the forces abroad during the War of the Spanish Succession. At the 1708 British general election, he was returned for Truro, and in a contest for Hereford, and opted to sit at Hereford. In 1710 he was admitted to the Inner Temple. He was returned in a contest for Hereford at the 1710 British general election. In 1711 he was a commissioner for taking subscriptions to the South Sea Company. He was returned unopposed at the 1713 British general election.

Brydges succeeded his father as 9th Baron Chandos on 16 October 1714, and was created Earl of Carnarvon on 19 October 1714. He took up the role of joint clerk of hanaper in reversion in November 1714. In 1718 he became governor of the Levant Company until 1736. He was created Duke of Chandos on 29 April 1719. Brydges also served as Governor of the slave-trading Royal African Company in the 1720s, recommending John Massey (who would later turn pirate) to serve as engineer for the RAC's fort at the River Gambia. In 1721 he became a governor of Charterhouse. He was Lord Lieutenant of the counties of Hereford and Radnor and steward of crown manors for Radnorshire. He became a member of the Privy Council on 11 November 1721. He was Chancellor of the University of St Andrews (where he established the Chandos Chair of Medicine and Anatomy in 1721) from 1724 for the rest of his life. In 1737 he was appointed ranger of Enfield chase 1737. He became one of the founding governors of the Foundling Hospital in 1739.

== Technical interests ==
After Brydges was elected a Fellow of the Royal Society in 1694, he attended their scientific meetings when he could, and up to 1702 served four times on the Society’s Council. He was a friend of the Newtonian John Keill, and dedicatee of his book on Astronomy. In 1716 Chandos appointed the experimental philosophy lecturer John Theophilus Desaguliers, who was Demonstrator at the Royal Society, to be his chaplain. He used Desaguliers more as a technical adviser than as a clergyman and their correspondence discusses issues that arose during the building of Canons such as ventilation and pipework for garden water features. Desaguliers helped with several technically based business ventures, such as Chandos’s scheme to manufacture soap using potash imported from Africa. His involvement with the York Buildings Company led to a project to use steam power to raise water from the Thames to supply parts of London. At one time there was a furnace at Canons attempting to obtain traces of gold from various ores and minerals. Although none of his business ventures proved commercially viable his interest in new scientific ideas led the Duke of Chandos to build up an impressive collection of scientific equipment and an observatory at Canons.

== Wealth ==
Brydges amassed great wealth through his public offices. The ethics of his financial operations were called into question at the time, but it was generally accepted that people could profit from public office. He continued to engage in speculative investments after being made Duke of Chandos in 1719, but lost money in the South Sea Bubble and the York Buildings Company.

Brydges built a magnificent house "at vast expense" at Cannons, an estate near Edgware in Middlesex. There he ran through several architects prominent in the English Baroque. He began in 1713 with William Talman, whom he dismissed in favour of John James in 1714; James had partly executed his designs before James Gibbs succeeded him in 1715. Howard Colvin (ref) concludes that the south and east elevations, as well as the chapel, were the designs of Gibbs. Brydges dismissed Gibbs in 1719, and completed the house under the supervision of John Price and, in 1723–25, Edward Shepherd. Cannons was demolished in 1747. On its site, now incorporated in Greater London, is Canons Park.

Brydges is said to have considered building a private road across his own lands between this place and his never completed house in Cavendish Square, London, probably also designed by Gibbs.

== Handel and Pope ==
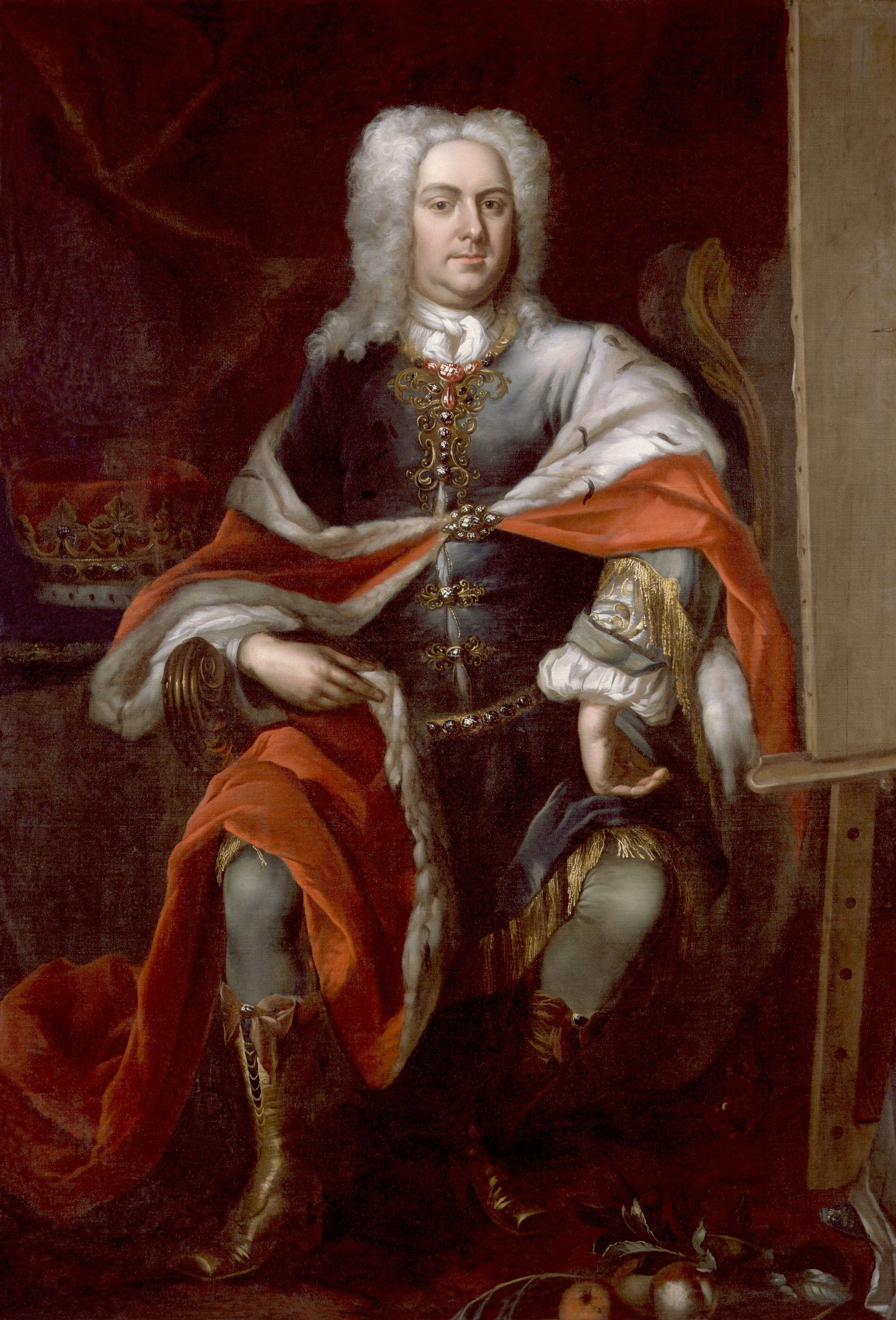
1726 portrait of Chandos by Herman van der Mijn

The Duke is chiefly remembered on account of his connections with George Frideric Handel, for whom he acted as a major patron, and with Alexander Pope, seen as having slandered Chandos in one of his poems. He served as an early patron to his relative George Rodney, later to become famous for his victory at the Battle of the Saintes, during his early career in the navy.

=== Chandos and Handel ===
Before Chandos was made a duke, he employed the young composer George Frideric Handel over a period of two years, 1717–18. Handel lived at Cannons, where he composed his oratorio Esther and his pastoral opera Acis and Galatea. Handel also composed the Chandos Anthems for his patron; they were first performed at the parish church of St Lawrence, Little Stanmore, with the composer playing the organ of 1716 which has survived there to the present day.

In 1719 Chandos was one of the main subscribers in the Royal Academy of Music, not the currently well-known conservatoire of that name but a corporation that produced baroque opera on stage in London.

=== Chandos and Pope ===
Alexander Pope, who in one of his Moral Essays (the Epistle to Burlington) was alleged to have ridiculed Cannons under the guise of Timon's Villa, later referred to the Duke in the line, "Thus gracious Chandos is belov'd at sight"; but Jonathan Swift, less complimentary, called him "a great complier with every court". The poet was caricatured by Hogarth for his supposed servility to Chandos. Pope published a denial of his alleged satire of the Duke's estate, in which he said that the estate of the poem "differs in every particular from" Chandos's. According to Pope’s biographer Maynard Mack, Chandos thereafter assured Pope by letter that he believed him, i.e. that the Epistle to Burlington was not intended as a satire of his estate. The malice, indeed, was on the part not of Pope, but of the insinuators and slanderers, the hack writers whom Pope had ridiculed as dunces in his Dunciad; Mack calls the affair a "falsehood of considerable damage to [Pope's] character".

== Marriages and issue ==
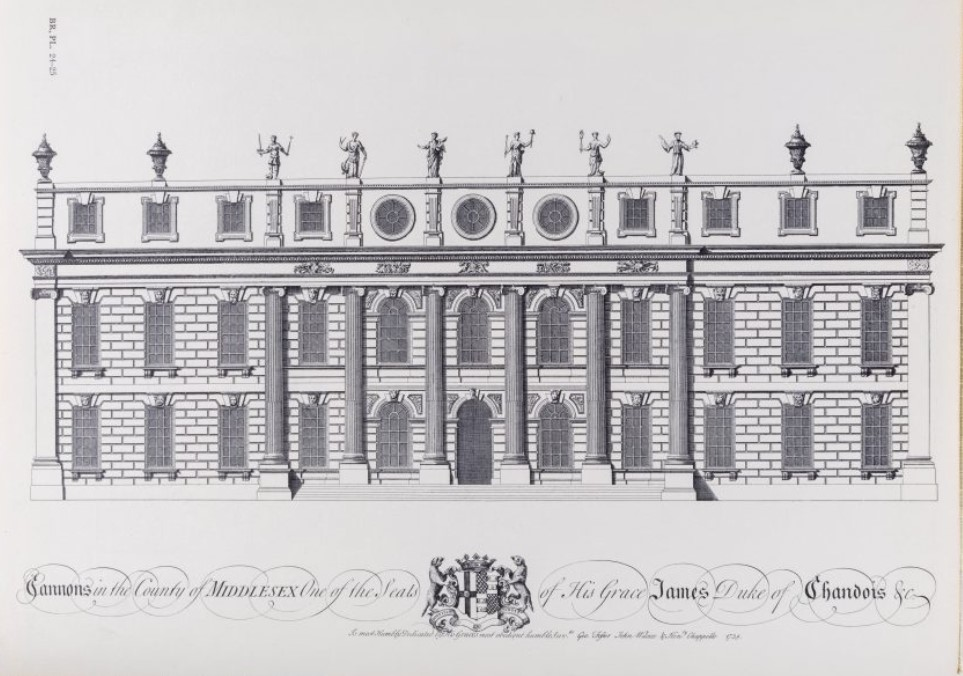
Cannons House, Middlesex, England, seat of the Duke of Chandos

Chandos was married three times. On 2 February 1695, he married Mary Lake, daughter of Sir Thomas Lake, of Cannons, Middlesex and his wife Rebecca Langham.

The marriage produced two sons who survived childhood:

1. John Brydges, Marquess of Carnarvon (15 January 1703 – 8 April 1727)
2. Henry Brydges, 2nd Duke of Chandos (1 February 1708 – 28 November 1771).

His first wife Mary died on 15 September 1712. He then married Cassandra Willoughby of Wollaton Hall, the daughter of Francis Willoughby and Emma Barnard on 4 August 1713.

His second wife Cassandra died on 18 July 1735. On 18 April 1736, he married Lydia Catherine Van Hatten, the daughter of John Van Hatten and Lydia Davall.

== Death and legacy ==
Chandos died in Cannons on 9 August 1744. Chandos and several members of his family (his first two wives) are buried at the Chandos Mausoleum at the Church of St Lawrence, Whitchurch Lane, Little Stanmore, London. His third wife, who survived him, moved to Shaw House, Berkshire where she died in 1750.

Mrs. Elizabeth Montagu in a letter, dated Sandleford, 21 December 1750 to Miss Anstey, wrote: "My dear Miss Anstey, ... A little before I went to London I lost my very good neighbour, the Dutchess of Chandos, a stroke of the palsy carried her off in a few days: her bodily pains were great, but her mind felt the serenity that gilds the evening of a virtuous life. She quitted the world with that decent fare-well which people take of it, who rather consider it as a place in which they are to impart good than to enjoy it Her character has made a great impression on me, as I think her a rare instance that age could not make conceited and stiff, nor retirement discontented, nor virtue inflexible and severe..."

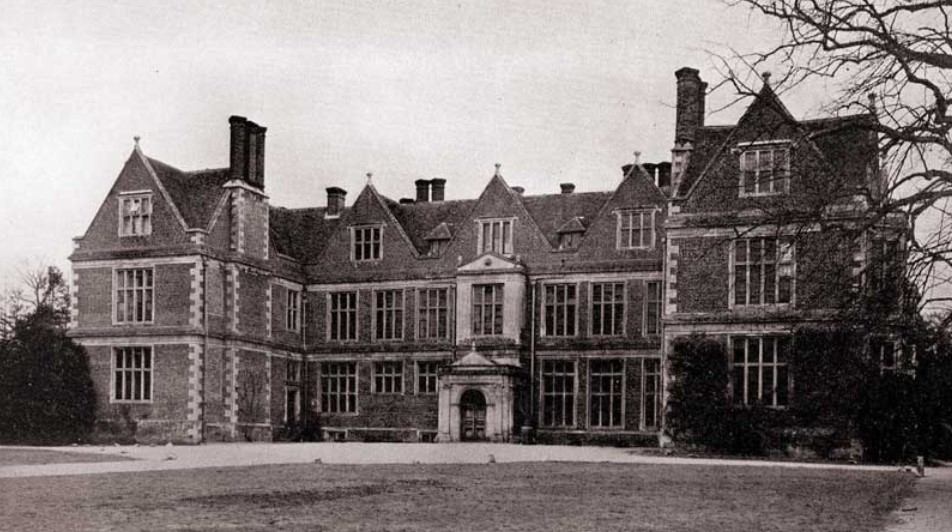
Shaw House, Newbury, Berkshire, estate acquired by the Duke

In a letter to Mrs. Donnellan dated Sandleford, 30 December 1750, Mrs. Montagu continued, "My rich neighbours are dull, and my poor ones are miserable ... The Dutchess of Chandos is greatly missed by the poor in this rigorous season. There is a family at Donnington Castle who are very generous and charitable, but nothing can entirely avail in a part of the world where manufacture decays; daily labour must give daily bread; occasional alms like medicine to the diseased, but can hardly procure constant health. To make the poor happy one must make them industrious..."

=== Succession ===
Chandos was succeeded by his son, Henry Brydges, 2nd Duke of Chandos, who found the estate so encumbered by debt that a demolition sale of Cannons was held in 1747, which dispersed furnishings and structural elements, with the result that elements of Cannons survive in several English country houses, notably Lord Foley's house, Witley Court at Great Witley, with its chapel (ceiling paintings by Bellucci and stained glass by Joshua Price of York after designs by Francesco Sleter). The pulpit and other fittings from Chandos's chapel were reinstalled in the parish church at Fawley, Buckinghamshire, by John Freeman of Fawley Court.

The 1st Duke's sister, The Hon. Mary Brydges, married Theophilus Leigh. They were the great-grandparents of Jane Austen.

== Notes ==
Parliament of England
Preceded by Paul Foley; James Morgan	Member of Parliament for Hereford; 1698–1707; With: Paul Foley 1698–1699; Samuel Pytts 1699–1701; Thomas Foley 1701–1707	Succeeded by Parliament of Great Britain
Parliament of Great Britain
Preceded by Parliament of England	Member of Parliament for Hereford; 1707–1714; With: Thomas Foley	Succeeded by Thomas Foley; The Viscount Scudamore
Academic offices
Preceded by The Duke of Atholl	Chancellor of the University of St Andrews; 1724–1744	Succeeded by Prince William Augustus, Duke of Cumberland
Honorary titles
Preceded by The Earl Coningsby	Lord Lieutenant of Herefordshire; 1721–1741	Succeeded by Charles Hanbury Williams
Preceded by The Earl Coningsby	Lord Lieutenant of Radnorshire; 1721–1744	Vacant Title next held by William Perry
Peerage of Great Britain
New creation	Duke of Chandos; 1719–1744	Succeeded by Henry Brydges
New creation	Earl of Carnarvon; 2nd creation 1714–1744	Succeeded by Henry Brydges
Peerage of England
Preceded by James Brydges	Baron Chandos; 2nd creation 1714–1744	Succeeded by Henry Brydges
