= James Brydges, 8th Baron Chandos =

English diplomat (1642–1714)

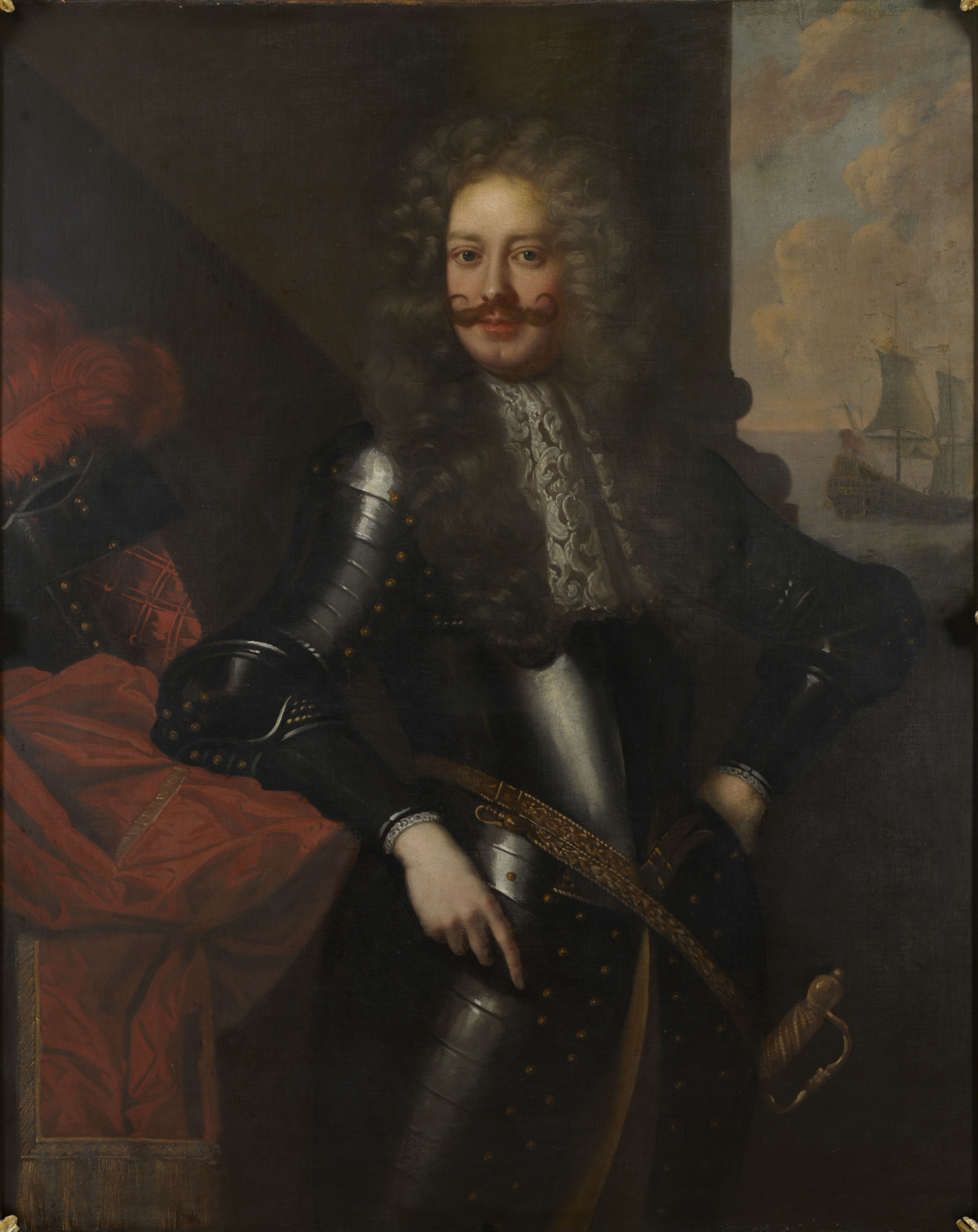
Lord Chandos

James Brydges, 8th Baron Chandos (1642–1714) was an English Ambassador to the Ottoman Empire.

He was the son of Sir John Brydges, 2nd Baronet, son of the 1st Baronet, and Mary Pearle. A graduate of St John's College, Oxford Brydges became 3rd Baronet, of Wilton, Herefordshire in 1651. He served as High Sheriff of Herefordshire in 1667. He became 8th Baron Chandos of Sudeley in 1686 following the death of his third cousin, William Brydges, 7th Baron Chandos.

Lord Chandos had connections with the Levant Company, for example through his father-in-law Sir Robert Barnard, who was a merchant. The Levant Company controlled the appointment of the British ambassador in Constantinople, and although King Charles II had some reservations about his politics, Chandos was elected by the Company on 22 April 1680. Royal Instructions were issued on 29 December. Lord Chandos arrived in Constantinople as the ambassador on 22 July 1681. He was recalled in November 1684, having served for only three years. He left Turkey in October 1687. At this time, the Ottoman Empire was making great advances into Europe, reaching the walls of Vienna.

He married Elizabeth Barnard and was the father of James Brydges, 1st Duke of Chandos, famous as the employer of Handel and friend of Alexander Pope. His daughter, The Hon. Mary Brydges, who married Theophilus Leigh, was the great-grandmother of Jane Austen.

Diplomatic posts
Preceded by Sir John Finch	British ambassador to the Ottoman Empire; 1681–1687	Succeeded by Sir William Trumbull
Peerage of England
Preceded by William Brydges	Baron Chandos; 2nd creation 1676–1714	Succeeded by James Brydges
Baronetage of England
Preceded by John Brydges	Baronet (of Wilton); 1652–1714	Succeeded by James Brydges
