= Solomon (Handel) =

Oratorio by George Frideric Handel

George Frideric Handel

Solomon, HWV 67, is an oratorio by George Frideric Handel. The anonymous libretto – currently thought to have been penned by the English Jewish poet/playwright Moses Mendes (d.1758) – is based on the biblical stories of the wise king Solomon from the First Book of Kings and the Second Book of Chronicles, with additional material from Antiquities of the Jews by ancient historian Flavius Josephus. The music was composed between 5 May and 13 June 1748. The first performance took place on 17 March 1749, with Caterina Galli in the title role at the Covent Garden Theatre in London, where it had two further performances. Handel revived the work in 1759.

The oratorio contains a short and lively instrumental passage for two oboes and strings in Act Three, known as "The Arrival of the Queen of Sheba", which has become famous outside the context of the complete work. It was featured at the 2012 London Olympics opening ceremony as James Bond (Daniel Craig) goes to meet the Queen at Buckingham Palace.

== Background ==
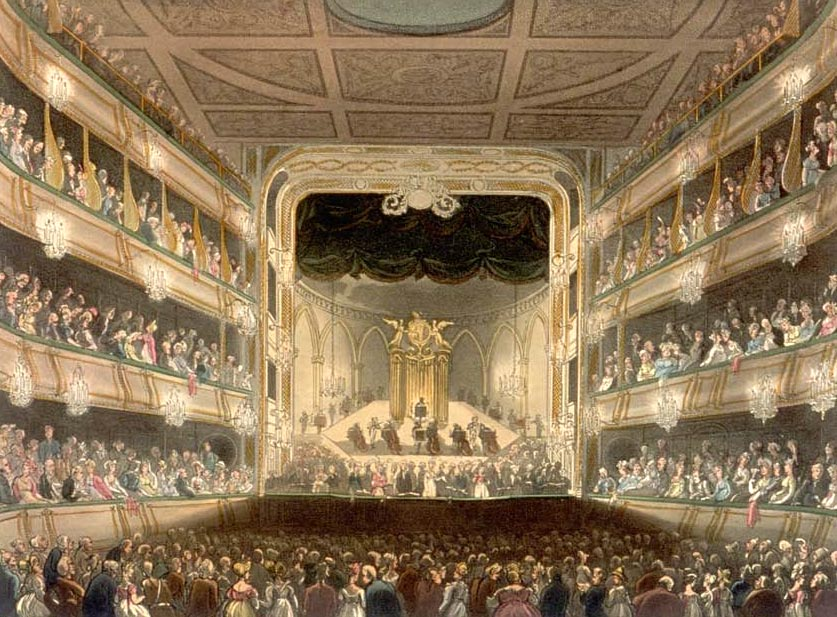
Theatre at Covent Garden where Solomon was first performed

The German-born Handel had been resident in London since 1712 and had there enjoyed great success as a composer of Italian operas. His opportunities to set English texts to music had at first been more limited; he had spent the years 1717 to 1719 as composer in residence to the wealthy Duke of Chandos where he had written church anthems and two stage works, Acis and Galatea and Esther; and had composed vocal music to English words for various royal occasions, including a set of Coronation anthems for King George II in 1727, which had made a huge impact. In 1731, a performance of the 1718 version of Esther, a work in English based on a Biblical drama by Jean Racine, was staged in London without Handel's participation and had proved popular, so Handel revised the work and planned to have it performed at the theatre where his Italian operas were being presented.

However the Bishop of London would not permit a drama based on a Biblical story to be acted out on the stage, and therefore Handel presented Esther in concert form, thus giving birth to the English oratorio. Such was the success of his oratorios in English that eventually Handel abandoned Italian opera, his last being Deidamia in 1741, and produced a string of masterpieces of oratorio in English.

Opera seria, the form of Italian opera that Handel composed for London, focused overwhelmingly on solo arias and recitatives for the star singers and contained very little else; they did not feature separate choruses. With the English oratorios Handel had the opportunity to mix operatic arias in English for the soloists with large choruses of the type that he used in the Coronation anthems. The oratorios found a wider audience among more social classes than the aristocratic audience who had sponsored and enjoyed Handel's Italian operas. Solomon was widely recognised by commentators of the day as a eulogy for Georgian England, with the just and wise King Solomon representing King George II, and the mighty, prosperous kingdom of Israel reflecting the similarly happy state of England at the time of the work's premiere, in the view of its creators. However, a 21st-century commentator has noted that Solomon was not a great commercial success with London audiences of the time, possibly because of complexities and ambiguities in its portrayal of the central character King Solomon.

== Dramatis personae ==
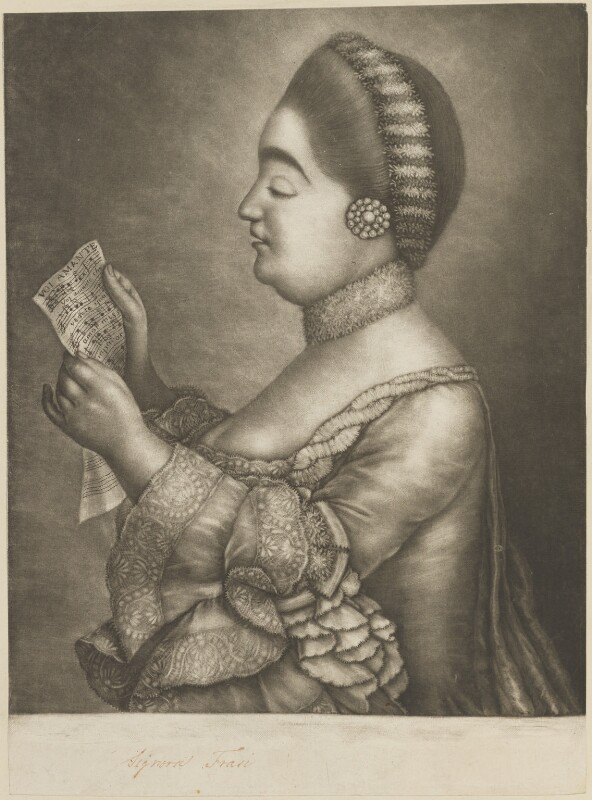
Giulia Frasi, soprano, creator of several roles in Solomon

Roles, voice types, and premiere cast
Role	Voice type	Premiere cast 17 March 1749
Solomon	alto	Caterina Galli
Solomon's Queen	soprano	Giulia Frasi
Nicaule, Queen of Sheba	soprano	Giulia Frasi
First harlot	soprano	Giulia Frasi
Second harlot	mezzo-soprano	Sibilla Gronamann (Mrs Pinto)
Zadok, the High Priest	tenor	Thomas Lowe
A Levite	bass	Henry Theodore Reinhold
Attendant	tenor	
Chorus of priests, chorus of Israelites

== Synopsis ==
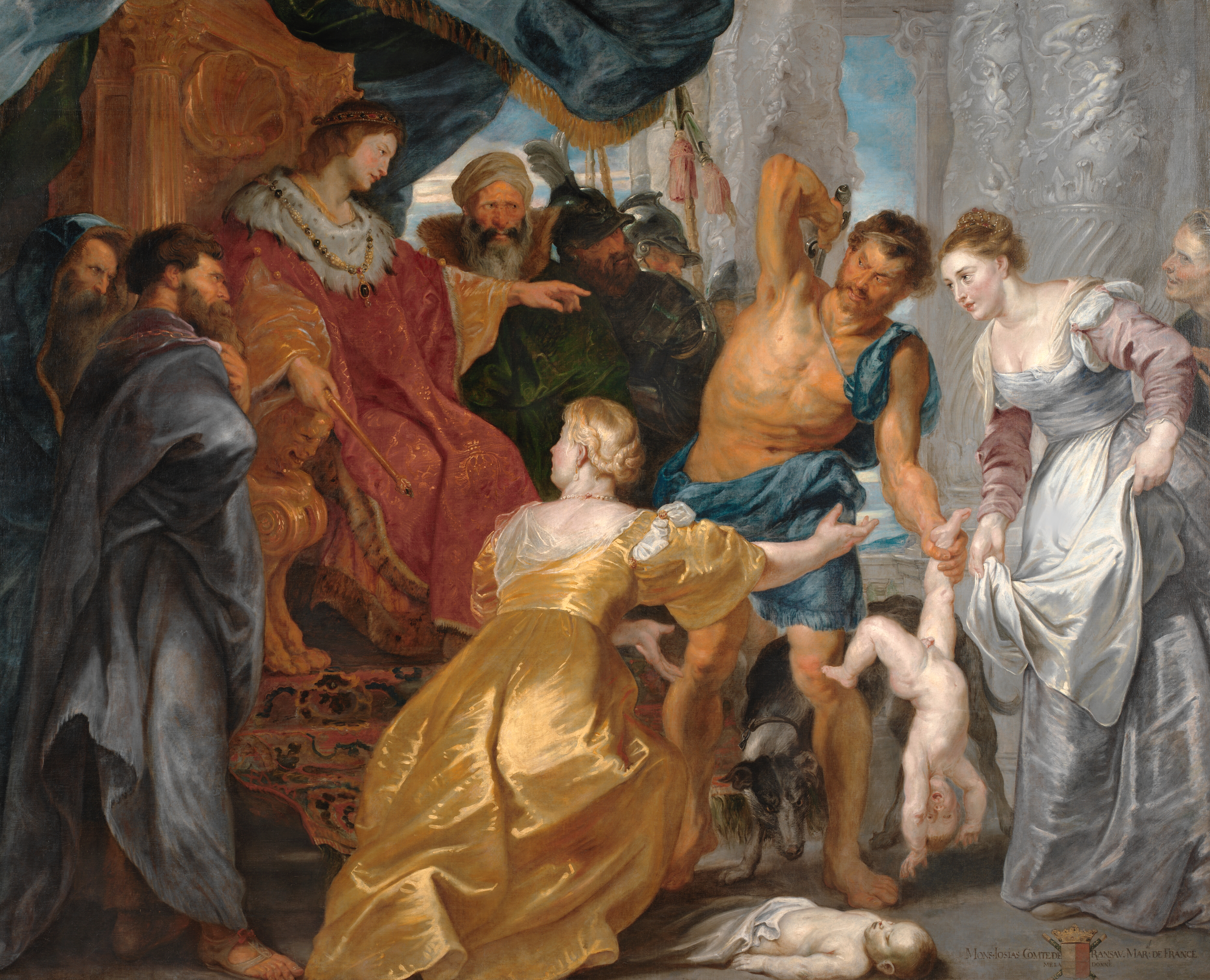
The Judgement of Solomon after Peter Paul Rubens

=== Act 1 ===
The work begins with Solomon and his people celebrating the consecration of the Temple he has built in Jerusalem. Solomon rejoices in his married happiness to his one wife (unlike the biblical Solomon, who is stated to have had hundreds of wives and concubines), and promises to build his queen a palace for her. They express their love for each other and retire for the night as flower-scented breezes and nightingales' songs lull them to rest.

=== Act 2 ===
The wisdom of Solomon is presented in the famous biblical story of two harlots who each claimed a single baby as her own. Solomon offers to solve the case by splitting the infant in half with his sword, but the real mother rejects this solution and offers to hand the child over to the other woman, as Solomon knew the true parent would do. The First Harlot and the chorus praise Solomon's judgement.

=== Act 3 ===
In Act Three we see a state visit from the Queen of Sheba to Solomon's kingdom. The king and his people entertain her with a musical masque of magnificent choruses depicting in turn the "lulling" sound of gentle music, the desire for military glory, the despair of an unhappy lover, and a storm which turns to calm. All celebrate the Israel of the wise ruler Solomon as a Golden Age of peace, happiness, and prosperity.

== List of musical numbers ==
Act Three begins with the very famous sinfonia known as "The Arrival of the Queen of Sheba". (Note: "Sinfonia" in this context means a purely instrumental piece. "Accompagnato" is a recitative accompanied by the orchestra, rather than by continuo instruments only, as in the passages marked "recitative".)

Act One
1. Overture
Scene 1: Solomon, Zadok, priests and chorus
2.Your harps and cymbals (chorus)
3.Praise ye the Lord (Levite – air)
4.With pious heart (chorus)
5.Almighty Power (Solomon – accompagnato)
6.Imperial Solomon (Zadok – recitative)
7.Sacred raptures (Zadok – air)
8.Throughout the land (chorus)
9.Bless’d be the Lord (Solomon – recitative)
10.What though I trace (Solomon – air)
Scene 2: To them the Queen
11.And see my Queen (Solomon – recitative)
12.Bless’d the day (Queen – air)
13.Thou fair inhabitant of Nile (Solomon, Queen – recitative)
14.Welcome as the dawn of day (Queen Solomon – duet)
15.Vain are the transient beauties (Zadok – recitative)
16.Indulge thy faith (Zadok – air)
17.My blooming fair (Solomon – recitative)
18.Haste to the cedar grove (Solomon – air)
19.When thou art absent (Queen – recitative)
20.With thee th’unshelter’d moor (Queen – air)
21.May no rash intruder ("Nightingale Chorus") (chorus)

Act Two
Scene 1: Solomon, Zadok, Levite, chorus of priests and Israelites
22.From the censer curling rise (chorus)
23.Prais’d be the Lord (Solomon – recitative)
24.When the sun o’er yonder hills (Solomon – air)
25.Great prince (Levite – recitative)
26.Thrice bless’d that wise discerning king (Levite – air)
Scene 2: To them an attendant
27.My sovereign liege (Attendant, Solomon – recitative)
Scene 3: To them the two harlots
28.Thou son of David (First harlot – recitative)
29.Words are weak (First and second harlot, Solomon – trio)
30.What says the other (Solomon, second harlot – recitative)
31.Thy sentence, great king (Second harlot – air)
32.Withhold, withhold the executing hand (First harlot – recitative)
33.Can I see my infant gor’d (First harlot – air)
34.Israel attend (Solomon – accompagnato)
35.Thrice bless’d be the king (First harlot, Solomon – duet)
36.From the east unto the west (chorus)
37.From morn to eve (Zadok – recitative)
38.See the tall palm (Zadok – air).
39.No more shall armed bands (First harlot – recitative)
40.Beneath the vine (First harlot – air)
41.Swell, swell the full chorus (chorus)

Act Three
42.Sinfonia ("The Arrival of the Queen of Sheba")
Solomon, Queen of Sheba, Zadok, chorus of Israelites
43.From Arabia’s spicy shores (Queen of Sheba, Solomon – recitative)
44.Ev’ry sight these eyes behold (Queen of Sheba – air)
45.Sweep, sweep the string (Solomon – recitative)
46.Music spread thy voice around (Solomon and chorus)
47.Now a different measure (Solomon and chorus)
48.Then at once from rage remove (Solomon – recitative)
49.Draw the tear from hopeless love (chorus)
50.Next the tortur’d soul release (Solomon – recitative)
51.Thus rolling surges rise (Solomon and chorus)
52.Thy harmony’s divine (Queen of Sheba – recitative)
53.Pious king (Levite – air)
54.Thrice happy king (Zadok – recitative)
55.Golden columns (Zadok – air)
56.Praise the Lord (chorus)
57.Gold now is common (Solomon – recitative)
58.How green our fertile pastures look (Solomon – air)
59.May peace in Salem (Queen of Sheba – recitative)
60.Will the sun forget to streak (Queen of Sheba – air)
61.Adieu, fair queen (Solomon – recitative)
62.Ev’ry joy that wisdom knows (Queen of Sheba, Solomon – duet)
63.The name of the wicked (chorus)

Arrival of the Queen of Sheba
performed by the Advent Chamber Orchestra with Humbert Lucarelli and Edino Biaggi on oboes

== Musical features ==
Solomon is richly orchestrated by the standards of its day, calling for an orchestra of flutes, oboes, bassoons, horns, trumpets, timpani, strings, and basso continuo instruments. Many of the grand and varied choruses are in eight parts ("a double chorus") instead of the more usual four parts. The final number of Act I is the chorus “May no rash intruder”, usually called the Nightingale Chorus, with flutes imitating birdsong over a gentle rustling effect created by strings divided into numerous different parts. Act 3 begins with the very famous sinfonia known as "The Arrival of the Queen of Sheba", a bright and sprightly orchestral piece featuring oboes which has often been used outside the context of the oratorios as a processional piece. Sir Thomas Beecham is believed to have given the name "The Arrival of the Queen of Sheba" to this sinfonia, perhaps in 1933 when he made a recording of it, or perhaps in 1955 when he recorded the oratorio in an abridged and re-orchestrated form.

== Recordings ==
Solomon discography
Year	Cast	Conductor, chorus and/or orchestra	Label
1955; 2005 digital remaster	John Cameron; Elsie Morison; Alexander Young; Lois Marshall	Sir Thomas Beecham; Beecham Choir Society; Royal Philharmonic Orchestra	EMI 2 CDs 5 86516 2
1967	Saramae Endich; Patricia Brooks; Alexander Young; John Shirley-Quirk	Stephen Simon; Vienna Youth Choir; Vienna Volksoper Orchestra	RCA Red Seal Records, 1968; 3 LPs LP LSC 6187
June 1984, St John's, Smith Square, London, after performances in Göttingen, Germany; incomplete	Carolyn Watkinson; Nancy Argenta; Barbara Hendricks; Joan Rodgers; Della Jones; Anthony Rolfe Johnson; Stephen Varcoe	John Eliot Gardiner; Monteverdi Choir; English Baroque Soloists	Philips digital recording 3 LPs 289-412612-1; 2 CDs 289-412612-2; 3 MC 289-412612-4
July and Aug. 1998, All Saints Church, Tooting, London	Andreas Scholl; Inger Dam-Jensen; Susan Gritton; Paul Agnew	Paul McCreesh, conductor Gabrieli Consort	CD:Archiv Produktion; Cat:4596882
2003	Michael Chance; Nancy Argenta; Laurie Reviol; Julian Podger; Steffen Balbach	Jürgen Budday; Maulbronn Chamber Choir; Hannoversche Hofkapelle	K&K Verlagsanstalt, 2004; 2 CDs KuK 73 / ISBN 3-930643-73-1
2006	Mark Padmore; Sarah Connolly; Susan Gritton; Carolyn Sampson	Daniel Reuss; Akademie für Alte Musik Berlin; RIAS Kammerchor	CD:Harmonia Mundi; Cat:HMC 901949.50
2006	Ewa Wolak; Elisabeth Scholl; Nicola Wemyss; Knut Schoch	Joachim Carlos Martini; Frankfurt Baroque Orchestra; Junge Kantorei	CD:Naxos; Cat:8.557574-75
2007	Tim Mead; Dominque Labelle; Claron McFadden; Roderick Williams	Nicholas McGegan; Winchester Cathedral Choir; Festspielorchester Göttingen	CD:Carus; Cat:CARUS83242
2022	Ana Maria Labin; Gwendoline Blondeel; Christopher Lowrey	Leonardo García Alarcón; Millenium Orchestra; Chœur de Chambre de Namur	CD:Ricercar; Cat:RIC449
