= Belshazzar (Handel) =

1744 oratorio by George Frideric Handel

- Oratorio by George Frideric Handel
- Portrait of Handel
- Catalogue: HWV 61
- Text: by Charles Jennens
- Language: English
- Based on: Fall of Babylon
- Composed: 1744
- Scoring: soloists; SATB choir; orchestra

Belshazzar (HWV 61) is an oratorio by George Frideric Handel. The libretto was by Charles Jennens, and Handel abridged it considerably. Jennens' libretto was based on the Biblical account of the fall of Babylon at the hands of Cyrus the Great and the subsequent freeing of the Jewish nation, as found in the Book of Daniel.

Handel composed Belshazzar in the late Summer of 1744 concurrently with Hercules, during a time that Winton Dean calls "the peak of Handel's creative life". It premiered the following Lenten season on 27 March 1745 at the King's Theatre, London. It fell into neglect after Handel's death, with revivals in the United Kingdom in 1847, 1848 and 1873. With the revival of interest in Baroque music and historically informed musical performance since the 1960s, Belshazzar receives performances in concert form today and is also sometimes fully staged as an opera. Among other performances, Belshazzar was staged at the Aix-en-Provence Festival in 2008 and by the Zurich Opera in 2019.

== Roles ==
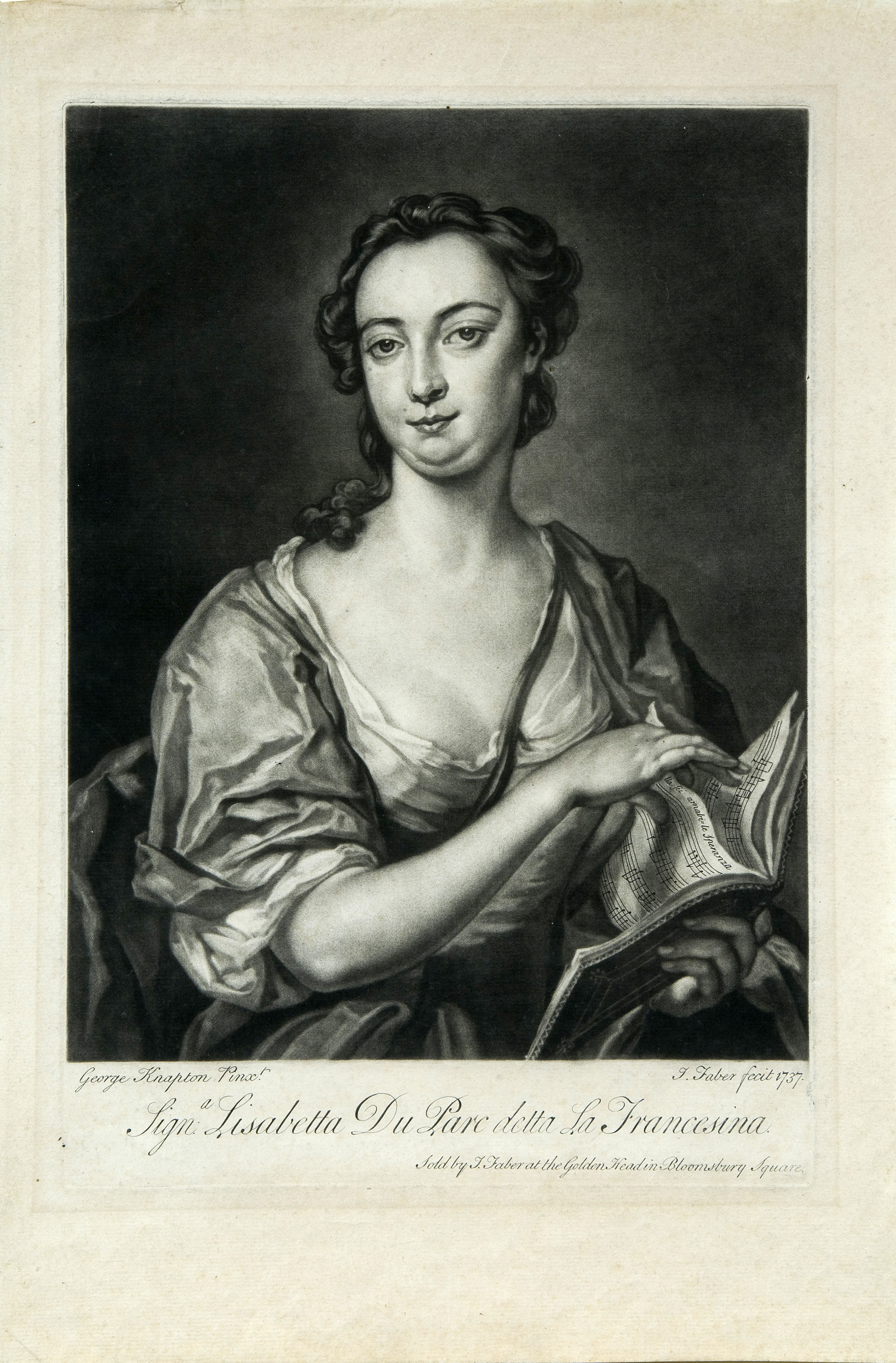
Èlisabeth Duparc, called "La Francesina", who created the role of Nitocris the Queen Mother in Belshazzar

Roles, voice types, and premiere cast
Role	Voice type	Premiere Cast, 27 March 1745
Belshazzar, King of Babylon	tenor	John Beard
Nitocris, mother of Belshazzar	soprano	Elisabeth Duparc ("La Francesina")
Cyrus, Prince of Persia	mezzo-soprano	Miss Robinson
Gobrias, an Assyrian Nobleman, joined the revolt of Cyrus	bass	Thomas Reinhold
Daniel, a Jewish prophet	contralto	Susannah Maria Cibber

== Synopsis ==
Precis: Despite the warnings of his mother Queen Nitocris, King Belshazzar of Babylon commits sacrileges against the God of the Jews, who are in captivity there. The city is besieged, Belshazzar is slain, and the Jews are freed to return to their homeland by Cyrus the Great of Persia.

=== Act I ===
Scene: Babylon, 538 BC. The city is being besieged by an army of Medes and Persians, led by Cyrus.

The Palace in Babylon

The Queen Mother Nitocris, mother of Belshazzar, muses on the changes that can affect even the most powerful of human beings (Accompanied recitative:Vain, fluctuating state of human empire!) Nitocris has become convinced that the God of the Jews, who are being held in captivity in Babylon, is the true God, and to Him she prays (Air:Thou, God most high, and Thou alone). The Jewish prophet Daniel, whom she has learnt to trust, comes to her. She is concerned about the fate of the empire under the rule of her wayward son. Daniel advises her that submission to the will of God will be rewarded (Air: Lament not thus, O Queen, in vain!).

The camp of Cyrus before Babylon. A view of the city, with the River Euphrates running through it

The Babylonians watch from the city walls and deride Cyrus and his army for making what they believe are impracticable preparations for storming the city (Chorus of Babylonians: Behold, by Persia's hero made). Gobrias, a Babylonian noble who has defected to Cyrus, fears they are right. Gobrias longs for revenge for the death of his son which was caused by Belshazzar (Air:Oppress'd with never-ceasing grief). Cyrus assures him he will prevail (Air:Dry those unavailing tears). Cyrus says that, as he stood on the banks of the Euphrates, he was seized by what seemed a divine inspiration (Accompanied recitative:Methought, as on the bank of deep Euphrates). Cyrus had the idea to drain the river which runs through the city and march into it along the riverbed. A good opportunity to do this will be during the feast of the Babylonian god Sesach, on which, Gobrias confirms, it is a religious duty to the Babylonians to get roaring drunk in the god's honour (Behold the monstrous human beast). Cyrus dedicates himself to the, as yet unknown to him, powerful deity whom he feels is directing his steps (Great God, who, yet but darkly known). His army comment that great deeds are only possible with divine assistance (Chorus of Medes and Persians:All empires upon God depend).

Daniel's house. Daniel, with the Prophecies of Isaiah and Jeremiah open before him. Other Jews

Daniel is consulting sacred Jewish texts for guidance (Air: O sacred oracles of truth). He feels sure that he and his fellow Jews will soon attain their freedom (Accompanied recitative:Rejoice, my countrymen! The time draws near). Daniel has found a prophecy in the texts that indicates that Cyrus is the anointed of the Lord and will imminently overthrow Babylon and release the Jews from their captivity (Air:Thus saith the Lord to Cyrus, his anointed). The Jews praise God for His mercy (Sing, O ye Heav'ns, for the Lord hath done it!)

The Palace

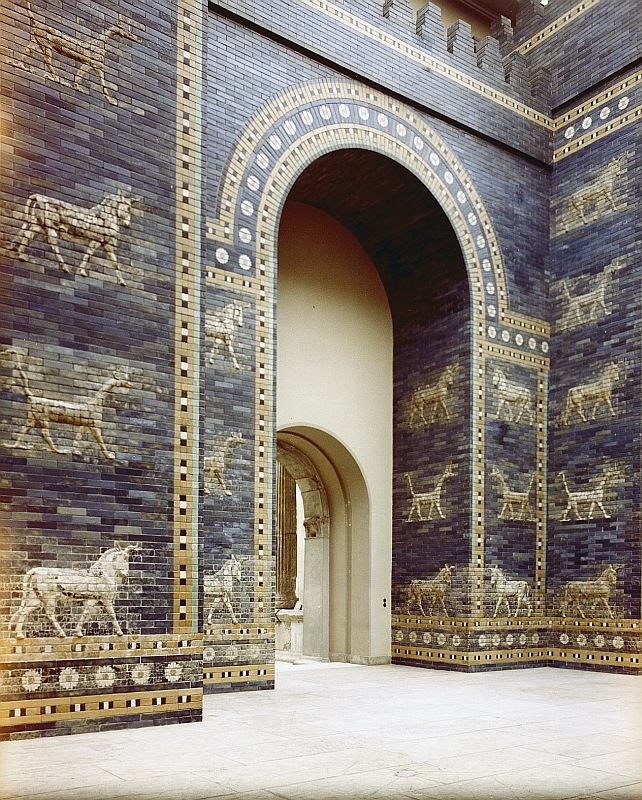
Ishtar Gate, Babylon

Belshazzar, with his mother, Babylonians and Jews present, is celebrating the feast of Sesach by uproariously drinking copious amounts of wine (Air:Let festal joy triumphant reign). His mother Nitocris rebukes him for his riotous excess (Air:The leafy honours of the field). Belshazzar responds that getting drunk on the feast of Sesach is the custom, in fact a duty, and noticing the Jews around him, orders the sacred vessels from the temple of Jerusalem that were brought as tribute to Babylon to be brought to him so he can continue to drink from them. His mother is horrified by such sacrilege and the Jews beg the King not to perform such a profanation (Chorus of Jews:Recall, O king, thy rash command!). Nitrocis implores her beloved son not to thus incur God's wrath, but Belshazzar scornfully rejects what he considers his mother's superstition (Duet:O dearer than my life, forbear!) The Jews comment that the Lord is slow to anger but his wrath will eventually be awoken (Chorus of Jews:By slow degrees the wrath of God to its meridian height ascends).

=== Act 2 ===
Without the city, the river almost empty

The Persians are elated that Cyrus' scheme has succeeded and the Euphrates has been diverted (Chorus of Medes and Persians:See, from his post Euphrates flies). Cyrus assures his army that now is the perfect time to attack as their enemies will all be off their guard due to being intoxicated or in a drunken stupor after the feast of Sesach (Air:Amaz'd to find the foe so near). The army is eager to follow him into battle (Chorus of Medes and Persians:To arms, to arms, no more delay!).

A banquet-room, adorned with the images of the Babylonian gods. Belshazzar, his wives, concubines, and lords, drinking out of the Jewish temple-vessels, and singing the praises of their gods

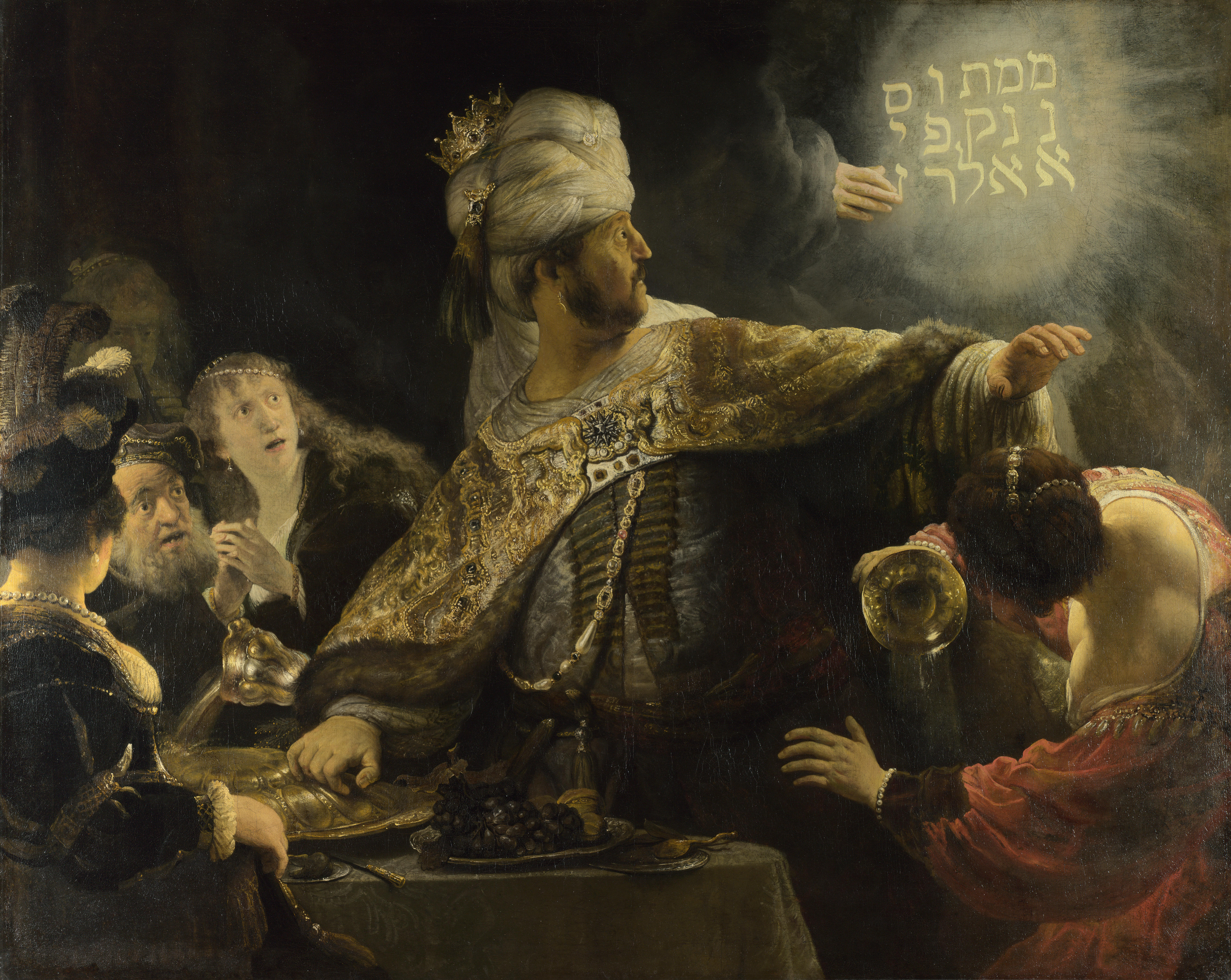
Belshazzar and the writing on the wall, Rembrandt

The Babylonians are having a wonderful time on their holiday getting drunk in honour of their gods (Chorus of Babylonians:Ye tutelar gods of our empire, look down). King Belshazzar praises wine (Let the deep bowl thy praise confess). Belshazzar taunts the God of Israel with impotence (Accompanied recitative:Where is the God of Judah's boasted pow'r?) but as he is going to drink, a hand appears writing upon the wall over against him: he sees it, turns pale with fear, drops the bowl of wine, falls back in his seat, trembling from head to foot, and his knees knocking against each other (directions from original libretto). The Babylonians are dismayed (Chorus of Babylonians: Help, help the king! He faints, he dies!) Belshazzar draws their attention to the hand -Pointing to the hand upon the wall, which, while they gaze at it with astonishment, finishes the writing, and vanishes (original directions). Belshazzar, dismayed, orders his wise men and soothsayers brought to him. They enter to an orchestral interlude but are unable to offer any elucidation of the strange writing. The Babylonians are terrified (Chorus of Babylonians:Oh, misery! Oh terror, hopeless grief!). Queen Nitocris advises her son to call the prophet Daniel to interpret the writing, which he does, and offers rewards to the prophet when he arrives for interpreting the text. Daniel rejects any monetary inducement however (Air:No, to thyself thy trifles be) and offers his interpretation of the writing on the wall for free (Accompanied recitative:Yet, to obey His dread command). Daniel says the words on the wall are "Mene, mene, tekel, upharsin", which he interprets to mean "You have been tried in the balance and found wanting". Queen Nitocris is greatly distressed and begs her son to abandon his profligate ways (Air:Regard, O son, my flowing tears).

Cyrus, Gobrias and Chorus of Persians and Medes, within the City

Cyrus is thankful that he and his army have succeeded in entering Babylon (Air:O God of truth, O faithful guide). He orders Gobrias, who is familiar with the city, to lead the way, and commands that no Babylonian except the tyrannical King shall be harmed. His men praise his wisdom and mercy (Chorus of Medes and Persians:O glorious prince).

=== Act 3 ===
The palace

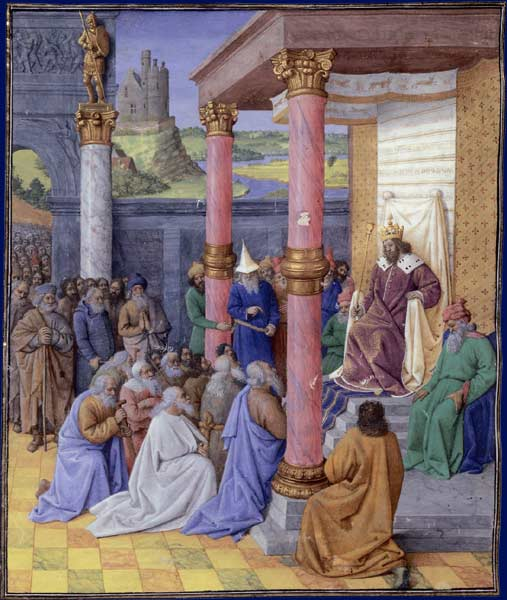
Cyrus the Great permits the Jews to rebuild Jerusalem, medieval illumination

Queen Nitocris is alternating between hope that her son will see the error of his ways and despair that the empire under his rule is doomed (Air:Alternate hopes and fears distract my mind). Daniel advises her that there is little chance of Belshazzar's reformation (Air:Can the black Aethiop change his skin). They receive news that Babylon has been invaded by Cyrus and his army, which alarms the Queen but elates the Jews (Chorus of Jews: Bel boweth down, Nebo stoopeth!)

Belshazzar, his lords, and other Babylonians, with their swords drawn

Belshazzar, inspired by the "juice" of his god Sesach, prepares to fight Cyrus and the Persians (Air: I thank thee, Sesach!) A martial "symphony" (orchestral interlude) ensues as the two armies meet. Belshazzar is slain and Gobrias gives thanks to God (Air:To pow'r immortal my first thanks are due). The victorious Cyrus orders that the Queen Mother Nitocris and the prophet Daniel should come to no harm (Air:Destructive war, thy limits know). Nitocris appears and thanks him for his clemency, as Cyrus promises to be a second son to her (Duet:Great victor, at your feet I bow). The prophet Daniel enters and tells Cyrus that he has fulfilled the Lord's predictions. The Jews praise God (Chorus of Jews:Tell it out among the heathen). Cyrus pledges to rebuild Jerusalem and allow the Jews to return there (Accompanied recitative:Yes, I will rebuild thy city, God of Israel!). Daniel, Nitocris, and the Jews give thanks to God (Soloists and Chorus of Jews:I will magnify Thee, O God my king).

== Musical features ==
After he had received the text from his collaborator Charles Jennens, Handel wrote to him "Your most excellent Oratorio has given me great delight in setting it to Musick and still engages me warmly. It is indeed a Noble piece, very grand and uncommon, it has furnished me with Expressions, and has given me Opportunity to some very particular ideas, besides so many great Choruses." The highly differentiated choruses with great contrast in tone between the music for the choruses of Jews, Babylonians and Persians is one of the most distinctive features of the piece. The Babylonians are characterised in Handel's music not as evil pagans but as happy pleasure-seekers with dance derived foot-tapping tunes. The Jews by contrast are given music of weighty and solemn dignity and the music for the chorus of Persians is marked by nobility and fugal development. The work is notable also for its characterisation through music of the leading roles, especially the dignified and sad figure of the Queen Mother Nitocris, despairing over her son's behaviour.

== Recordings ==
=== Audio recordings ===
Belshazzar discography, audio recordings
Cast Belshazzar, Nitocris, Cyrus, Daniel, Gobrias	Conductor, orchestra, chorus	Label
Robert Tear, Felicity Palmer, Maureen Lehane, Paul Esswood, Peter van der Bilt	Nikolaus Harnoncourt, Concentus Musicus Wien, Stockholm Chamber Choir	Teldec CD Cat:2292-42567-2
Anthony Rolfe-Johnson, Arleen Auger, Catherine Robbin, James Bowman, David Wilson-Johnson	Trevor Pinnock, The English Concert, The Choir of the English Concert	Deutsche Grammophon CD Cat: DDD ATR3
Mark Le Brocq, Miriam Allan, Patrick von Goethem, Michael Chance, Andre Morsch	Jurgen Budday, Hannoversche Hofkapelle, Maulbronner Kammerchor	K&K CD Cat:KuK67
Markus Brutscher, Simone Kermes, Christopher Robson, Patrick Van Goethem, Franz-Josef Selig	Peter Neumann, Collegium Cartusianum, Cologne Chamber Choir	Dabringhaus und Grimm Gold CD Cat:MDG 332 1079-2
Allan Clayton, Rosemary Joshua, Caitlin Hulcup, Iestyn Davies, Jonathan Lemalu	William Christie, Les Arts Florissants	Les Arts Florissants Editions CD Cat: AF001

=== Video recording ===
Belshazzar discography, video recordings
Cast Belshazzar, Nirocris, Cyrus, Daniel, Gobiras	Conductor, orchestra, chorus, Stage director	Label
Kenneth Tarver, Rosemary Joshua, Bejun Mehta, Kristina Hammarström, Neal Davies	René Jacobs, Akademie für Alte Musik Berlin, RIAS Kammerchor, Christof Nel	Harmonia Mundi DVD Cat: HMD9809028

== See also ==
- Letters and writings of George Frideric Handel
