= Joshua (Handel) =

Oratorio by George Frideric Handel

George Frideric Handel

Joshua (HWV 64) is an oratorio by George Frideric Handel. It was composed in a month, from 19 July 1747 to 19 August 1747, six months before the beginning of the oratorio season. Joshua is Handel's fourth oratorio based on a libretto by Thomas Morell. The oratorio premiered on 9 March 1748 at the Covent Garden Theatre, London. Joshua is based on the Biblical story of Joshua as the leader of the ancient Israelites. The story follows the Israelites from their passage over the Jordan River into Caanan and through the Battle of Jericho. The work also includes a love story elaborated from a few hints in the Biblical narrative between Caleb's daughter Achsah and Othniel, a young soldier.

Joshua was the fourth oratorio Handel had written within the span of twenty months. Following the Jacobite rising of 1745 in England, Handel produced a series of English oratorios based on military themes: Occasional Oratorio, Judas Maccabaeus, Alexander Balus, Joshua, and Solomon. The military conquests the Israelites achieve in the oratorio were seen as parallels to the victory of the Hanoverian regime in crushing the Jacobite rebellion. Joshua was one of his shortest oratorios and contained no genuine overture, instead having only a brief orchestral movement simply titled "Introduction." Joshua also included at least five pieces borrowed from other Handel compositions. Part One was completed on 30 July 1747, Part Two on 8 August and Part Three on 19 August.

Handel's second-most-famous chorus, "See the Conq'ring Hero Comes," was first penned for Joshua. It was an immensely popular number and Handel soon added it to Judas Maccabaeus, which had premiered the season before. The chorus is more often thought of in connection with Judas because of its greater fame. When a friend said to Handel that, in his opinion, the composer had written better pieces than "See the Conq'ring Hero Comes", Handel replied "You will live to see it a greater favourite with the people than my other fine things."

== Dramatis personae ==
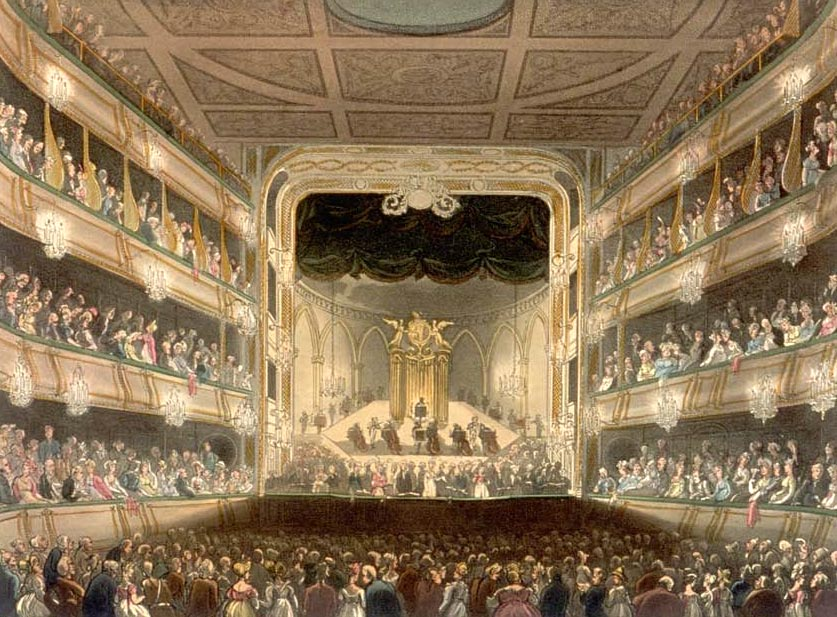
A picture of the theatre at Covent Garden where Joshua was first performed

Roles, voice types, and premiere cast
Role	Voice type	Premiere cast, 9 March 1748
Joshua, Leader of the Israelites	tenor	Thomas Lowe
Othniel, a young warrior, promised to Achsah	alto	Caterina Galli
Caleb	bass	Thomas Reinhold
Achsah, Daughter of Caleb	soprano	Signora Casarini
Angel	tenor	unknown
Chorus of Israelites, Chorus of the Defeated Israelites, Chorus of the Tribe of Judah, Chorus of Youths, Chorus of Virgins

== Instrumentation ==
The work is scored for strings, two oboes, flute, two trumpets, two horns, timpani, and continuo.

== Plot summary ==
=== Part One ===
The Children of Israel celebrate the end of their journey over the Jordan River and into the land of Canaan, praising God for his blessings and Joshua for his leadership. An angel appears to Joshua and appoints him to lead an army against Jericho. Joshua prepares his soldiers for the attack. Othniel, one of Joshua's warriors, is betrothed to Achsah and readies himself to part from his love and go into battle with Joshua.

=== Part Two ===
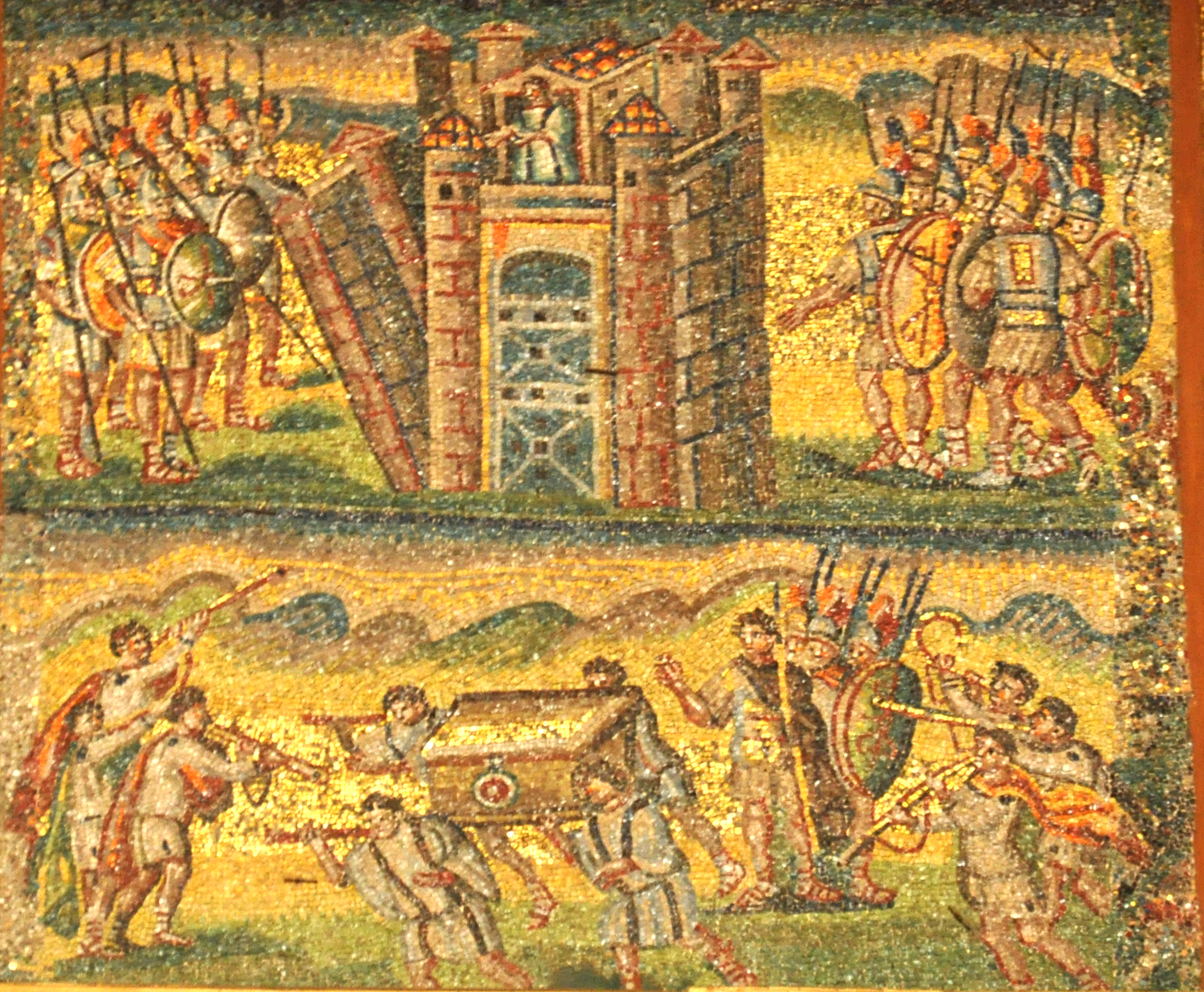
Joshua and his troops destroying the walls of Jericho, English 5th century

Joshua and his army destroy the mighty city of Jericho and then commemorate the Feast of the Passover. The army gets word of the defeat of Israel at Ai and Joshua gathers his men to renew their attacks. Othniel calls upon Achsah, but Caleb, her father, dismisses him, telling him to go join the war in the defense of Israel's allies. Miraculously, the sun and moon stay their courses, allowing the Israelites to continue fighting until they arise victorious.

=== Part Three ===
With the fighting over, Joshua is again lauded as a great leader. He then gives Caleb the land which had been promised to him by Moses. Caleb pledges his daughter's hand to whoever can conquer the city of Debir. Othniel rises to the occasion and asks God to guide him to success. He returns triumphant and Achsah praises God protecting her beloved. The people raise their thanksgivings to God for their prosperity and deliverance.

== Musical features ==
The air for Achsah in the first act "Hark, 'tis the linnet and the thrush!" contains naturalistic tone painting effects for the birdsong referred to in the text, with a solo violin depicting the linnet and a flute the thrush. The martial tone of the trumpets and drums illustrate the battle sequences. The famous chorus "See the Conq'ring Hero Comes" is heard first as a chorus of youths with horns in the orchestra, then a chorus of virgins with flutes, and finally by full chorus with drums. The air in the last act for Achsah "Oh, had I Jubal's lyre", a short expression of joy with virtuoso writing for the soprano, is often heard and recorded outside the context of the full work.

== Musical numbers ==
=== Part One ===
- Introduction (Orchestra)
- Ye sons of Israel (Chorus)
- Behold, my friends (Tenor, Bass recitative)
- Oh first in wisdom (Bass aria)
- Matrons and Virgins (Soprano recitative)
- Oh who can tell (Soprano aria)
- Caleb, attend to all I now prescribe (Tenor recitative)
- To long posterity (Tenor solo with Chorus)
- So long the memory (Tenor recitative)
- While Kedron's brook (Tenor aria)
- But who is He (Alto recitative)
- Awful pleasing being, say (Alto aria)
- Joshua, I come commission'd (Tenor, Soprano recitative)
- Leader of Israel (Tenor, Soprano recitative)
- To give command (Tenor recitative)
- Haste, Israel, haste (Tenor aria)
- The Lord commands (Chorus)
- In these blest scenes (Soprano, Alto recitative)
- 'Tis Achsah's voice (Soprano, Alto recitative)
- Hail, lovely virgin (Soprano, Alto aria)
- Hark, hark! 'Tis the linnet (Soprano)
- Oh Achsah, form'd for ev'ry chaste delight (Alto recitative)
- Our limpid streams (Soprano, Alto duet)
- The trumpet calls (Alto recitative)
- May all the host of heaven (Chorus)

=== Part Two ===
- 'Tis well (Tenor recitative)
- March (Orchestra)
- Glory to God (Tenor solo and Chorus)
- The walls are levell'd (Bass recitative)
- See the raging flames arise (Bass aria)
- To vanity and earthly pride (Soprano aria)
- Let all the seed of Abrah'm (Tenor recitative)
- Almighty ruler of the skies (Tenor solo and Chorus)
- Joshua, the men (Bass recitative)
- How soon our tow'ring hopes are cross'd (Chorus)
- Whence this dejection (Tenor recitative)
- With redoubled rage return (Tenor aria)
- We with redoubled rage (Chorus)
- Now give the army breath (Alto recitative)
- Heroes, when with glory burning (Alto aria)
- Indulgent heaven hath heard (Soprano recitative)
- As chears the sun (Soprano aria)
- Sure I'm deceived (Bass, Alto recitative)
- Nations, who in future story (Alto aria)
- Brethren and friends (Tenor recitative)
- Sinfonia (Orchestra)
- Thus far our cause (Bass recitative)
- Trumpet flourish (Orchestra)
- Oh! thou bright orb (Tenor solo and Chorus)

=== Part Three ===
- Hail! Mighty Joshua (Chorus)
- Happy, oh, thrice happy we (Soprano aria)
- Caleb, for holy Eleazer send (Tenor, Bass recitative)
- Shall I in Mamre's fertile plain (Bass aria)
- For all these mercies we will sing (Chorus)
- Oh Caleb, fear'd by foes (Alto, Bass recitative)
- Place danger around me (Alto aria)
- Father of mercy (Chorus)
- In bloom of youth (Tenor recitative)
- See the conqu'ring hero comes (Trio SSA)
- See the godlike youth advance (Duet SA)
- See the conqu'ring hero comes (Chorus)
- Welcome, my son (Bass, alto, soprano recitative)
- Oh, had I Jubal's lyre (Soprano aria)
- While life shall last (Alto recitative)
- Oh peerless maid (Soprano, Alto duet)
- While lawless tyrants (Bass recitative)
- The great Jehovah (Chorus)

== Notable performances ==
The first staging of Joshua occurred in 1752. Before the performance, Handel cut the first aria, entitled "O first in wisdom." He also expanded the overture by adding the fugue and courante from Solomon. For another performance in 1754, Handel again cut the first aria, but then added five more pieces: four arias and one recitative. Joshua was performed in Salisbury in 1754. It was performed again in 1756 during a three-day Handel festival and in London in 1755 and 1759. Other noteworthy performances include:

- Three Choirs Festival in 1759, 1769, 1773 and 1781
- The Oxford Music Room in 1766, 1768 and 1773
- Winchester 1770–1783
- Berlin in 1827 and 1832
- London Sacred Harmonic Society in 1839
- Aberdare in 1953

== Recordings ==
- With John Mark Ainsley, tenor, James Bowman, countertenor, Emma Kirkby, soprano, The King's Consort and New College Choir, Robert King, conductor. Release date 1990. Hyperion CD: CDA66461/2
- With James Gilchrist tenor, Myung-Hee Hyun soprano, Alex Potter, counter-tenor, Konstantin Wolff bass, Collegium Cartusianum, Peter Neumann, conductor. Release date 2008. MDG CD:MDG3321532
- With Katherine Manley soprano, Alexandra Gibson mezzo-soprano, Allan Clayton tenor, George Humphreys bass, Richard Rowntree tenor, London Handel Orchestra and Chorus, Laurence Cummings, conductor. Release date 2011. Somm Recordings CD: SOMM2402
- With Mark Le Brocq tenor, James Rutherford bass, Miriam Allan soprano, David Allsopp countertenor. Hannoversche Hofkapelle, Maulbronner Kammerchor, Jürgen Budday, conductor. Release date 2016. K&K CD:KuK253
