= Herr, wie du willt, so schicks mit mir, BWV 73 =

Church cantata

Herr, wie du willt, so schicks mit mir
- BWV 73
- Church cantata by J. S. Bach
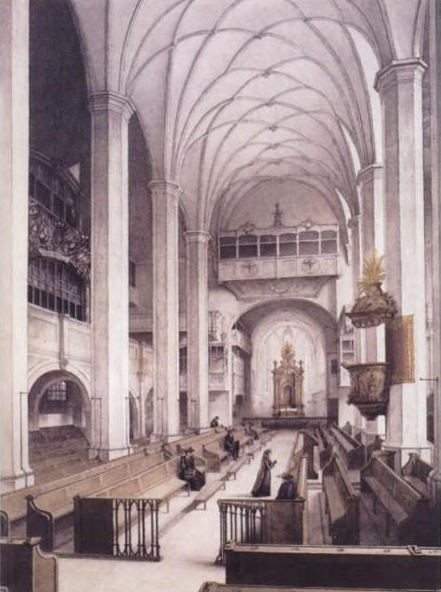
- Thomaskirche, Leipzig
- Occasion: Third Sunday after Epiphany
- Bible text: Matthew 8:2
- Chorale: by Kaspar Bienemann
- Performed: 23 January 1724: Leipzig
- Movements: 5
- Vocal: SATB choir; solo: soprano, tenor and bass
- Instrumental: horn; 2 oboes; 2 violins; viola; continuo

Herr, wie du willt, so schicks mit mir (Lord, as you will, so let it be done with me), BWV 73, is a church cantata by Johann Sebastian Bach. He composed it for the third Sunday after Epiphany and first performed it in Leipzig on 23 January 1724. It was probably composed shortly before the first performance.

== History and words ==
Bach arrived in Leipzig in 1723. He set about composing a series of cantatas for performance in the city's principal churches through the liturgical year. This one was written for the Third Sunday after Epiphany. The prescribed readings for the Sunday were taken from the Epistle to the Romans, rules for life (Romans 12:17–21), and from the Gospel of Matthew, the healing of a leper (Matthew 8:1–13). The unknown poet takes the words of the leper, "Lord, if thou wilt, thou canst make me clean", as a starting point and recommends his attitude of trust for the situation of facing death. In the first movement he contrasts lines of Kaspar Bienemann's chorale "Herr, wie du willst, so schick's mit mir" with three sections of recitative. Movement 3 paraphrases Jeremiah 17:9. The words of movement 4 are the leper's words from the Gospel. The closing chorale is the final stanza of Ludwig Helmbold's hymn "Von Gott will ich nicht lassen".

Bach first performed the cantata on 23 January 1724, and performed it again in a revised version on 21 January 1748 or 26 January 1749.

The music was published in 1870 as part of the Bach-Gesellschaft-Ausgabe, an edition of the composer's complete works. The editor was Wilhelm Rust.

== Scoring and structure ==
The cantata in five movements is scored for soprano, tenor and bass soloists, a four-part choir, horn (replaced by organ in the revised version), two oboes, two violins, viola, and basso continuo.

1. Chorus and recitative (tenor, bass, soprano): Herr, wie du willt, so schicks mit mir
2. Aria (tenor): Ach senke doch den Geist der Freuden
3. Recitative (bass): Ach, unser Wille bleibt verkehrt
4. Aria (bass): Herr, so du willt
5. Chorale: Das ist des Vaters Wille

== Music ==
The opening chorus is based on the first stanza of the hymn "Herr, wie du willt, so schicks mit mir", which is expanded by recitatives of the three soloists. A four-note motif on the words "Herr, wie du willt" is introduced by the horn and repeated throughout the movement. The accompagnato recitatives for all soloists are accompanied by the oboes with material from the ritornello, while the horn and the strings continue the motif. In the final repeat of the ritornello the choir sings the motif, and repeats it in a final "cadenza".

In movement 3 the will of man is described as "bald trotzig, bald verzagt" (quickly contrary, quickly dashed), illustrated in the melody. Movement 4 begins without a ritornello. The unusual three stanzas, all beginning with the words "Herr, so du willt", are delivered as free variations and closed by a coda. Similar to movement 1, a motif on "Herr, so du willt" opens and is repeated throughout the movement, finally in the coda. This motif is the beginning of the famous aria Bist du bei mir from the Notebook for Anna Magdalena Bach, long attributed to Bach, but written by Gottfried Heinrich Stölzel.

The melody of the closing chorale (with the incipit "Das ist des Vaters Wille") is based on the French popular song "Une jeune fillette".

== Recordings ==
- Bach Made in Germany Vol. 1 – Cantatas II, Günther Ramin, Thomanerchor, Gewandhausorchester, soprano soloist of the Thomanerchor, Hans-Joachim Rotzsch, Hans Hauptmann, Eterna 1954
- Die Bach Kantate Vol. 23, Helmuth Rilling, Figuralchor der Gedächtniskirche Stuttgart, Bach-Collegium Stuttgart, Magdalene Schreiber, Adalbert Kraus, Wolfgang Schöne, Hänssler 1971
- J. S. Bach: Das Kantatenwerk – Sacred Cantatas Vol. 4, Gustav Leonhardt, Knabenchor Hannover, Collegium Vocale Gent, Gewandhausorchester, soprano soloist of the Knabenchor Hannover, Kurt Equiluz, Max van Egmond, Teldec 1977
- J. S. Bach: Cantatas, Philippe Herreweghe, Collegium Vocale Gent, Barbara Schlick, Howard Crook, Peter Kooy, Virgin Classics 1990
- J. S. Bach: Complete Cantatas Vol. 10, Ton Koopman, Amsterdam Baroque Orchestra & Choir, Caroline Stam, Paul Agnew, Klaus Mertens, Antoine Marchand 1998
- J. S. Bach: Cantatas for the 3rd Sunday of Epiphany, John Eliot Gardiner, Monteverdi Choir, English Baroque Soloists, Joanne Lunn, Julian Podger, Stephen Varcoe, Archiv Produktion 2000
- J. S. Bach: Cantatas Vol. 17, Masaaki Suzuki, Bach Collegium Japan, Yukari Nonoshita, Gerd Türk, Peter Kooy, BIS 2002
- J. S. Bach: Cantatas for the Complete Liturgical Year Vol. 8, Sigiswald Kuijken, La Petite Bande, Gerlinde Sämann, Petra Noskaiová, Christoph Genz, Jan van der Crabben, Accent 2008

== Sources ==
- Herr, wie du willt, so schicks mit mir, BWV 73: Scores at the International Music Score Library Project
- Herr, wie du willt, so schicks mit mir BWV 73; BC A 35 / Sacred cantata (3rd Sunday of Epiphany) Bach Digital
- Cantata BWV 73 Herr, wie du willt, so schicks mit mir history, scoring, sources for text and music, translations to various languages, discography, discussion, Bach Cantatas Website
- BWV 73 Herr, wie du willt, so schicks mit mir English translation, University of Vermont
- BWV 73 Herr, wie du willt, so schicks mit mir text, scoring, University of Alberta
- Luke Dahn: BWV 73.5 bach-chorales.com
