= Kenneth Tarver =

American operatic tenor

- Born: Detroit, Michigan, U.S.
- Education: Interlochen Arts Academy
- Alma mater: Oberlin Conservatory of Music; Yale School of Music
- Occupation: Operatic tenor
- Website: Official website

Kenneth Tarver is an American operatic tenor, known for his interpretations of Mozart and Rossini, as well as for a broad concert and operatic repertoire spanning Baroque to contemporary works. He has performed internationally with major orchestras and opera houses.

== Early life and education ==
Tarver is originally from Detroit, Michigan. He began his musical training at the Interlochen Arts Academy and later earned a Bachelor of Music in Vocal Performance from the Oberlin Conservatory of Music. He received a Master of Music in Vocal Performance from the Yale School of Music and subsequently joined the Young Artist Development Program at the Metropolitan Opera in New York City.

== Career ==
=== Concert and opera performances ===
Tarver has appeared with leading orchestras including the Seattle Symphony, New York Philharmonic, and the London Symphony Orchestra. He has performed at venues such as the BBC Proms, Carnegie Hall, and the Concertgebouw in Amsterdam.

In opera, he has sung principal roles at the Metropolitan Opera, Royal Opera House Covent Garden, Bayerische Staatsoper, Wiener Staatsoper, Teatro Real, Deutsche Oper Berlin, and Staatsoper Unter den Linden. His roles include Don Ottavio (Don Giovanni), Ferrando (Così fan tutte), Tamino (Die Zauberflöte), Idomeneo, Tito (La clemenza di Tito), Almaviva (Il barbiere di Siviglia), Don Ramiro (La Cenerentola), Lindoro (L’italiana in Algeri), Rodrigo (Otello), and the title role in Rossini's (Otello).

His concert repertoire includes works by Hector Berlioz (Les Troyens, Roméo et Juliette, Béatrice et Bénédict), George Frideric Handel (Messiah, Belshazzar, Joshua, Judas Maccabaeus), and Johann Sebastian Bach (St Matthew Passion, St John Passion, Mass in B minor, and Magnificat).

He has appeared at festivals including Aix-en-Provence, Edinburgh, Verbier, Lucerne, Tanglewood, Göttingen, and Rheingau. At the Rossini in Wildbad festival, he has performed numerous rarely heard Rossini roles.

Tarver’s broader repertoire includes works by Ludwig van Beethoven, Igor Stravinsky, Joseph Haydn, Claudio Monteverdi, Jean-Philippe Rameau, Tommaso Traetta, and Rodion Shchedrin. He has performed at international venues such as La Monnaie, Teatro Colón, Opera Australia, Bolshoi Theatre, Israeli Opera, and the Musikverein in Vienna.

=== Selected conductors collaborated with ===
Tarver has worked with many distinguished conductors, including:

Claudio Abbado, Pierre Boulez, Sir Colin Davis, Riccardo Chailly, James Levine, Alberto Zedda, Kent Nagano, Gustavo Gimeno, René Jacobs, Laurence Cummings, Teodor Currentzis, Gianluca Capuano, Christophe Rousset, Nikolaus Harnoncourt, Giovanni Antonini, Carlo Rizzi, Robin Ticciati, Antonino Fogliani, Ivor Bolton, Ludovic Morlot, Bernard Haitink, Sir Mark Elder, Maurizio Benini, Ádám Fischer, Frans Brüggen, Daniel Harding, Gianluigi Gelmetti, Jesús López-Cobos, Louis Langrée, Bobby McFerrin, Keri-Lynn Wilson, Nathalie Stutzmann, and Valery Gergiev.

=== Major engagements ===
Highlights of Tarver’s operatic and concert engagements include:

- Royal Opera House, Covent Garden – Falstaff (Fenton), Otello (Rodrigo), Così fan tutte (Ferrando), La Cenerentola (Don Ramiro)
- Seattle Symphony – Persephone, Roméo et Juliette, Requiem (Berlioz), Symphony No. 9 (Beethoven)
- New York Philharmonic – Die Entführung aus dem Serail (Belmonte), Messiah
- London Symphony Orchestra – Les Troyens (Iopas), Roméo et Juliette, Béatrice et Bénédict, Pulcinella
- Staatsoper Unter den Linden – Belshazzar, Il Barbiere di Siviglia, Antigone (Traetta), Die Entführung aus dem Serail
- BBC Proms – Les Troyens (Iopas), Pulcinella
- Rossini in Wildbad – Lead roles in Sigismondo, Eduardo e Cristina, La gazza ladra, Bianca e Falliero, L’inganno felice, and L’occasione fa il ladro
- Edinburgh International Festival – Armida (Gernando), La donna del lago (Uberto), Roméo et Juliette
- Additional appearances at the Teatro Carlo Felice, Opéra de Monte-Carlo, Opera Vlaanderen, Dutch National Opera, Opéra National de Paris, La Monnaie, Teatro Real, Deutsche Oper Berlin, Semperoper Dresden, Wiener Staatsoper, Teatro Colón, Musikverein, Bergen National Opera, Bachakademie Stuttgart, and others

== Discography ==
Tarver’s discography spans opera and concert works on major labels including Deutsche Grammophon, LSO Live, Harmonia Mundi, Sony Classical, NAXOS, BR-Klassik, MDG, and BBC Opus Arte.

=== Rossini ===
- Sigismondo
- Eduardo e Cristina
- Bianca e Falliero
- La gazza ladra
- La donna del lago
- Aureliano in Palmira
- Il viaggio a Reims
- Petite messe solennelle
- Paventa Insano

=== Mozart ===
- Don Giovanni
- Così fan tutte
- Lucio Silla
- Idomeneo
- Mozart & Salieri – Arias & Overtures

=== Berlioz ===
- Roméo et Juliette
- Les Troyens
- Béatrice et Bénédict
- La Mort d'Orphée
- Les nuits d'été
- Grande Messe des Morts

=== Handel ===
- Belshazzar
- Judas Maccabaeus
- Joshua
- Messiah

=== Other ===
- Bach – Mass in B minor, Magnificat, St John Passion, St Matthew Passion
- Leonard Bernstein – A White House Cantata
- Igor Stravinsky – Pulcinella
- Domènec Terradellas – Sesostri
- Arias by Pacini and Mercadante
- Songs by Charles Ives
- Verdi – Falstaff, Messa Solenne
