= Jürgen Budday =

- Born: 1948 (age 77–78); Germany
- Genres: Classical, Early, Baroque, Romantic, Modern
- Occupation: Conductor
- Label: K&K Verlagsanstalt

Jürgen Budday (born 1948 in Germany) is a German conductor, director of church music and music teacher. He is artistic director of the concert series at the UNESCO World Heritage Site Maulbronn Abbey, of the choir 'Maulbronner Kantorei' and of the Maulbronn Chamber Choir.

== Biography ==
Budday studied music education, church music and musicology at the Academy of Music in Stuttgart and, since 1979, has been teaching music at the Evangelical Seminary Maulbronn, a Protestant private boarding school in Maulbronn. For his teaching and artistic activity, he has received many awards, including the Bundesverdienstkreuz am Bande (German Cross of Merit) and the Bruno Frey Prize from the Baden-Württemberg State Academy of Music, Ochsenhausen. Since 2002, Budday has also held the chair of the choral committee of the German Music Council. Several concert recordings have been made under his artistic direction. These have included the Handel oratorios Jephtha, Samson, Judas Maccabaeus, Saul and the Messiah with highly distinguished soloists such as Emma Kirkby, Michael Chance, Nancy Argenta, David Thomas, Stephen Varcoe, Miriam Allan, Joanne Lunn and many others.

In 2011, Budday has been awarded the honorary title Professor by the Minister-President of Baden-Württemberg, who dignified Budday to be a musical ambassador of Baden-Württemberg.

== Awards ==
- 2013 Georg-Friedrich-Händel-Ring

== Discography ==
=== Oratorios by G.F.Handel ===
Historically informed performances in English

- Jephtha – Oratorio in three acts. An historically informed performance in English with Emma Kirkby (Soprano), Melinda Paulsen (Mezzo-soprano), Charles Humphries (Countertenor), Julian Podger (Tenor), Stephen Varcoe (Bass), Maulbronn Chamber Choir, Barockorchester der Klosterkonzerte (1998, concert recording, Maulbronn Monastery Edition)
- Samson – Oratorio in three acts. An historically informed performance in English with Sinéad Pratschke, Michael Chance, Mark LeBrocq, Raimund Nolte, David Thomas, Maulbronn Chamber Choir, Barockorchester der Klosterkonzerte (1999, concert recording, Maulbronn Monastery Edition)
- Judas Maccabäus – Oratorio in three acts. An historically informed performance in English with Sinéad Pratschke (Soprano), Catherine King (Mezzo-soprano), Charles Humphries (Countertenor), Mark LeBrocq (Tenor), Christopher Purves (Bass), Maulbronn Chamber Choir, Musica Florea Prag (2000, concert recording, Maulbronn Monastery Edition)
- Saul – Oratorio in three acts. An historically informed performance in English with Nancy Argenta (Soprano), Laurie Reviol (Soprano), Michael Chance (Countertenor), Marc LeBrocq (Tenor), Michael Berner (Tenor), Stephen Varcoe (Bass), Steffen Balbach (Bass), Hanoverian Court Orchestra/Hannoversche Hofkapelle (on period instruments), Maulbronn Chamber Choir (2002, concert recording, Maulbronn Monastery Edition)
- Solomon – Oratorio in three acts. An historically informed performance in English with Nancy Argenta (Soprano), Laurie Reviol (Soprano), Michael Chance (Countertenor), Julian Podger (Tenor), Steffen Balbach (Bass), Hanoverian Court Orchestra/Hannoversche Hofkapelle (on period instruments), Maulbronn Chamber Choir (2004, concert recording, Maulbronn Monastery Edition)
- Belshazzar – Oratorio in three acts. An historically informed performance in English with Miriam Allan (Soprano), Michael Chance (Countertenor), Patrick Van Goethem (Countertenor), Marc LeBrocq (Tenor), Stephen Varcoe (Bass), Maulbronn Chamber Choir, Hanoverian Court Orchestra/Hannoversche Hofkapelle (on period instruments). (2005, concert recording, Maulbronn Monastery Edition)
- Der Messias (The Messiah) – Complete Recording Oratorio in three parts by George Frideric Handel in the arrangement of Wolfgang Amadeus Mozart. Performed according to the traditions of the time, sung in German, with Marlis Petersen (Soprano), Margot Oitzinger (Alto), Markus Schäfer (Tenor), Marek Rzepka (Bass), Hanoverian Court Orchestra/Hannoversche Hofkapelle (on period instruments), Maulbronn Chamber Choir (2006, concert recording, Maulbronn Monastery Edition)
- Joshua – Unedited version in English from 1748. Performed according to the traditions of the time with Miriam Allan (Soprano), David Allsopp (Countertenor), Mark LeBrocq (Tenor), James Rutherford (Bass), Hanoverian Court Orchestra/Hannoversche Hofkapelle (on period instruments), Maulbronn Chamber Choir (Maulbronner Kammerchor) (2007, concert recording, Maulbronn Monastery Edition)

=== Other oratorios and masses ===
- Gioacchino Rossini: Petit Messe Solenelle – version for two pianos and harmonium with Laura de Souza (Soprano), Dalia Schaechter (Altus), Keith Ikaia Purdy (Tenor), Max Wittges (Bass), Ennio Pastorino und An Li Pang (Pianos), Carlotte Lootgieter (Harmonium), Maulbronn Chamber Choir (1996, concert recording)
- Felix Mendelssohn Bartholdy: Paulus with Brigitte Geller, Jolanta Michalska-Taliaferro, Lothar Odinius, Peter Lika, Kantorei Maulbronn, Mitglieder des SWF-Sinfonieorchesters (1998, concert recording)
- Charles Gounod: Cäcilienmesse & Gioacchino Rossini: Stabat Mater with Svetlana Strezeva, Jolanta Michalska-Taliaferro, Willi Stein, Nikita Storojev, Kantorei Maulbronn, Mitglieder des SWR-Sinfonieorchesters (1999, concert recording, Maulbronn Monastery Edition)
- Giacomo Puccini: Messa di Gloria & Felix Mendelssohn Bartholdy: Christus with Willi Stein (Tenor), Thomas Pfeiffer (Baritone), Kantorei Maulbronn, Mitglieder des SWR-Sinfonieorchesters (2001, concert recording, Maulbronn Monastery Edition)
- Felix Mendelssohn Bartholdy: Elias with Peter Lika (Bass), Heidi Elisabeth Meier (Soprano), Jolantha Michalska-Taliaferro (Altus), Hans Peter Blochwitz (Tenor), Kantorei Maulbronn, Mitglieder des SWR-Sinfonieorchesters (2003, concert recording, Maulbronn Monastery Edition)
- Max Bruch: Moses with Peter Lika (Bass), Birgitte Christensen (Soprano), Stefan Vinke (Tenor), Kantorei Maulbronn, Russian Chamber Philharmonic St. Petersburg (2005, concert recording, Maulbronn Monastery Edition)
- Johann Sebastian Bach: Mass in B minor with Joanne Lunn, Ursula Eittinger, Marcus Ullmann, Gotthold Schwarz, Maulbronn Chamber Choir, Hannoversche Hofkapelle (2008, concert recording, Maulbronn)
- Louis Spohr: Die letzten Dinge / The Last Judgement – The original version of the Oratorio from 1826, Miriam Meyer (Soprano), Ursula Eittinger (Mezzo-Soprano), Marcus Ullmann (Tenor), Josef Wagner (Bass), [Kantorei Maulbronn (Maulbronn Cantor Choir), Russian Chamber Philharmonic St. Petersburg (2010, concert recording, Maulbronn)

=== a cappella ===
- All meine Herzgedanken ~ Chormusik der Romantik, Maulbronn Chamber Choir (1991)
- Tröste mich wieder ~ Geistliche Chormusik, Maulbronn Chamber Choir (1993)
- From early dawn... until late at night, A daily musical routine according to the tradition of horary prayers with works by Orlando di Lasso, Joseph Rheinberger, Felix Mendelssohn Bartholdy, Rolf Schweizer, Johann H. Schein, Jozef Swider, Arvo Pärt, Sven D. Sandström and Max Reger. Maulbronn Chamber Choir (1999)
- Du verwandelst meine Klage in einen Reigen ~ Geistliche Chormusik, Maulbronn Chamber Choir (2003)
- Der Mensch lebt und bestehet ~ Geburt – Endlichkeit – Ewigkeit, Maulbronn Chamber Choir (2006)
- Transeamus usque Bethlehem ~ Europäische Weihnachtslieder und Motetten, Maulbronn Chamber Choir (2008)
- Die Nacht leuchtet wie der Tag, Maulbronn Chamber Choir (2010)
