= Joanne Lunn =

- Born: 1973; United Kingdom
- Education: Royal College of Music
- Occupation: Classical soprano

Joanne Lunn (born 1973) is an English classical soprano in opera and concert.

== Career ==
Joanne Lunn studied at Royal College of Music, where she graduated and received the Tagore Gold Medal.

Lunn performed in Monteverdi's L'incoronazione di Poppea, Gluck's operas Orfeo ed Euridice and Alceste, and in Verdi's Falstaff. In 2004 she appeared as Helena in Benjamin Britten's A Midsummer Night's Dream, conducted by John Eliot Gardiner and directed by David Pountney. She performed in Monteverdi's Orfeo, conducted by Philip Pickett, in Paris and for the Beijing International Music Festival.

In 2000 she took part in the Bach Cantata Pilgrimage with the Monteverdi Choir conducted by John Eliot Gardiner, a project which performed and recorded the complete church cantatas of Bach. Her recordings of Bach cantatas with John Eliot Gardiner and the Monteverdi Choir include Herr, wie du willt, so schicks mit mir, BWV 73, for the Third Sunday after Epiphany. She has also recorded Bach cantatas with the Bach Collegium Japan.

For Bach's motets, she collaborated in 2003 with the Hilliard Ensemble. She performed Bach's St Matthew Passion with the Orchestra of the Age of Enlightenment and Roger Norrington, also with Frieder Bernius, the Rotterdam Philharmonic Orchestra, and with the London Symphony Orchestra at the Barbican Hall. She recorded the work with Philippe Herreweghe. She recorded Bach's Mass in B minor with both Jürgen Budday and the Maulbronn Chamber Choir, and Marc Minkowski and Les Musiciens du Louvre. In 2010 she performed the work in St. David's Hall, Cardiff, with Elin Manahan Thomas, Robin Blaze, Toby Spence, Peter Harvey, the BBC National Chorus and Orchestra of Wales, conducted by Thierry Fischer.

Lunn recorded John Rutter's Mass of the Children with the City of London Sinfonia, conducted by the composer, and performed the work both at St Paul's Cathedral and at the Symphony Hall, Birmingham.
