= Marlis Petersen =

German operatic coloratura soprano (born 1968)

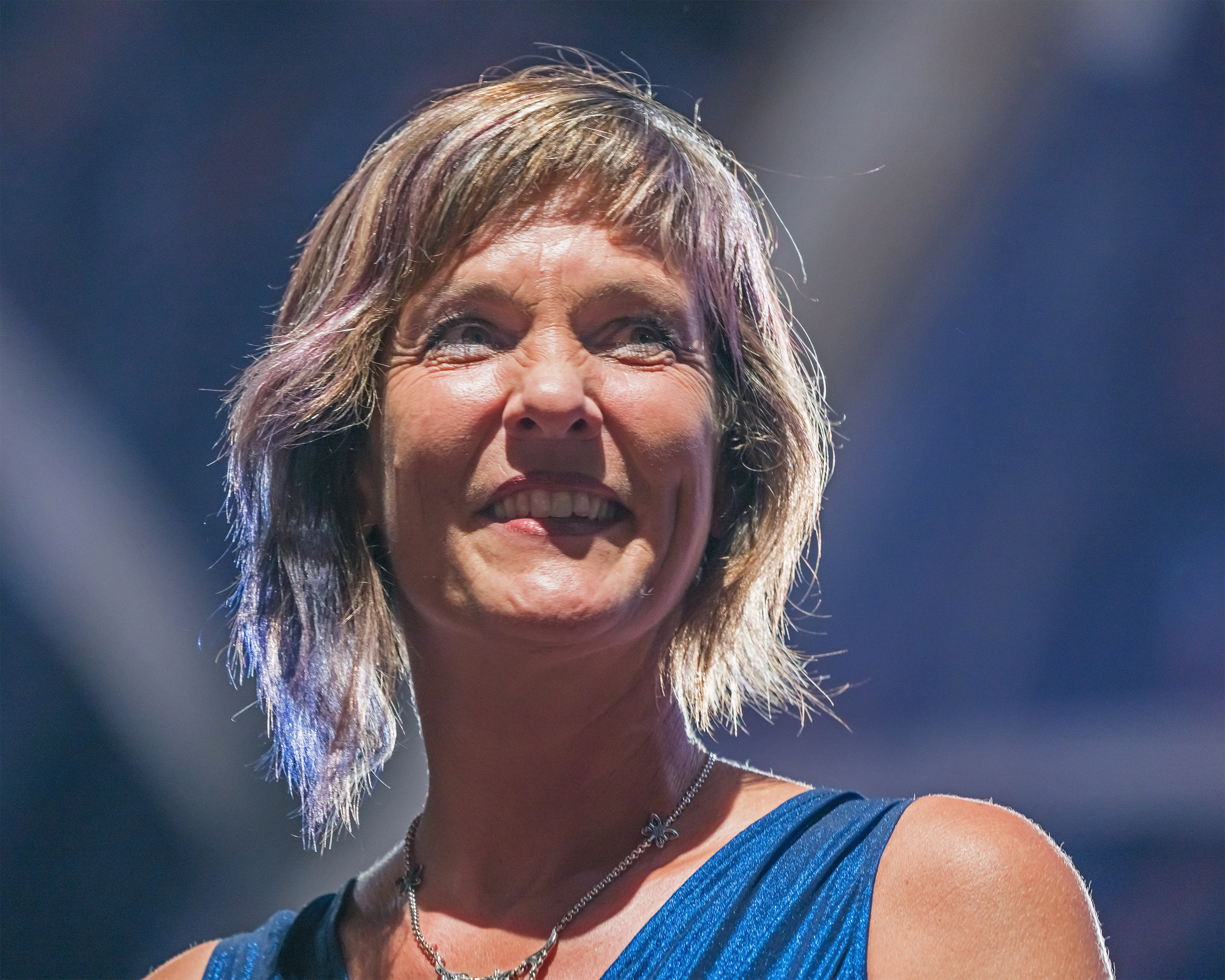
- Marlis Petersen in 2019
- Born: 3 February 1968 (age 57); Sindelfingen, West Germany
- Occupation: Soprano
- Years active: 1994–present
- Website: www.marlis-petersen.de

Marlis Petersen (born 3 February 1968) is a German operatic coloratura soprano.

== Career ==
Born in Sindelfingen, Baden-Württemberg, on 3 February 1968, Marlis Petersen won several piano competitions before eventually going to the Stuttgart Conservatory where she studied music education, flute and dance as well as voice. She made her operatic debut at the Staatstheater Nürnberg as Ännchen in Der Freischütz which led to a contract with the Deutsche Oper am Rhein, where she primarily sang in operas by Mozart and Strauss. On 6 September 2007, Petersen sang the role of Aphrodite in the world premiere of Hans Werner Henze's Phaedra at the Berlin State Opera. Another world premiere came in May 2008, when she sang the role of Marta in Manfred Trojahn's La Grande Magia at the Dresden Semperoper. Petersen has also appeared on the stages of Vienna, Salzburg, Munich, London, Paris, Geneva, and Monte Carlo and is also known for her portrayal of the demanding title role in Alban Bergs Lulu in ten productions around the world.

In addition to her operatic roles, Petersen is known for her performances in works by Johann Sebastian Bach with conductors Ton Koopman and Helmuth Rilling and for her Lieder recitals with pianist Jendrik Springer. She sang the title role in the premiere of the Aribert Reimann opera Medea at the Vienna State Opera in 2010.

In March 2010 Petersen undertook the role of Ophélie in Ambroise Thomas's Hamlet at the New York Metropolitan Opera. She spent less than four days preparing for the role, which, a reviewer remarked, "to judge from her beautiful and emotionally vulnerable singing, she clearly relishes."

In March 2021 she premiered in Barrie Kosky's new production of Der Rosenkavalier at the Bavarian State Opera, making role debut as the Marschallin.

Since 2009 she has lived in Athens.

== Awards ==
- 4 x Opernwelt "Singer of the year"
- 2017 Grammy nomination for Lulu
- 2021 Bavarian Kammersängerin

== Recordings ==
- Dimensions – Otherworld, Marlis Petersen (soprano), Camillo Radicke (piano). Compositions by Johannes Brahms, Carl Loewe, Max Reger etc. Label: Solo Musica OCLC 1355307116
- Dimensions – World, Marlis Petersen (soprano), Stephan Matthias Lademann (piano). Compositions by Franz Schubert, Clara and Robert Schumann, Johannes Brahms, Richard Wagner, Sigurd von Koch and Hans Sommer. Label: Solo Musica OCLC 1355307116
- Handel: Der Messias (Messiah), Marlis Petersen, Margot Oitzinger, Markus Schäfer, Marek Rzepka, Hanoverian Court Orchestra (on period instruments), Maulbronn Chamber Choir; Jürgen Budday, conductor. (2006 concert recording, sung in German). Label: Maulbronn Monastery Edition. OCLC 840348378
- Mozart: Il rè pastore, Annette Dasch, Kresimir Spicer, Marlis Petersen, Arpiné Rahdjian, Andreas Karasiak; Balthasar-Neumann-Ensemble; Thomas Hengelbrock, conductor. Label: Deutsche Grammophon (DVD). OCLC 315673679
- Haydn: Die Jahreszeiten, Marlis Petersen, Werner Güra, Dietrich Henschel; RIAS Kammerchor, Freiburg Baroque Orchestra; René Jacobs, conductor. Label: Harmonia Mundi. OCLC 882970646
- Bach: Cantatas Vol 19, Marlis Petersen, Klaus Mertens, Sandrine Piau, Bogna Bartosz, Johannette Zomer, Christoph Prégardien, James Gilchrist, Sibylla Rubens, Paul Agnew, Caroline Stam, Michael Chance; Amsterdam Baroque Orchestra & Choir; Ton Koopman, conductor. Label: Challenge. Marlis Petersen sings the solo cantata BWV 51 Jauchzet Gott in allen Landen with obbligato trumpet. OCLC 811333586
- Bach: Mass in B minor, Stella Doufexis, Marlis Petersen, Anke Vondung, Franz-Joseph Selig, Lothar Odinius, Christian Gerhaher; Bach-Collegium Stuttgart, Gächinger Kantorei; Helmuth Rilling, conductor. Label: Hänssler Classic. OCLC 705326726
- Haydn: Orlando paladino, Marlis Petersen, Tom Randle, Pietro Spagnoli, Magnus Staveland, Sunhae Im, Alexandrina Pendatchanska, Victor Torres, Arttu Kataja; Freiburg Baroque Orchestra; René Jacobs, conductor. Recorded live at Staatsoper Unter den Linden, Berlin, 8 May 2009. Label: EuroArts (DVD). OCLC 699521444
- Widmann: Arche, Marlis Petersen, Thomas E. Bauer, Iveta Apkalna, Kent Nagano, Philharmonisches Staatsorchester Hamburg. Label: ECM. OCLC 1154069371
