= The Arrival of the Queen of Sheba =

1749 sinfonia from Handel's oratorio Solomon

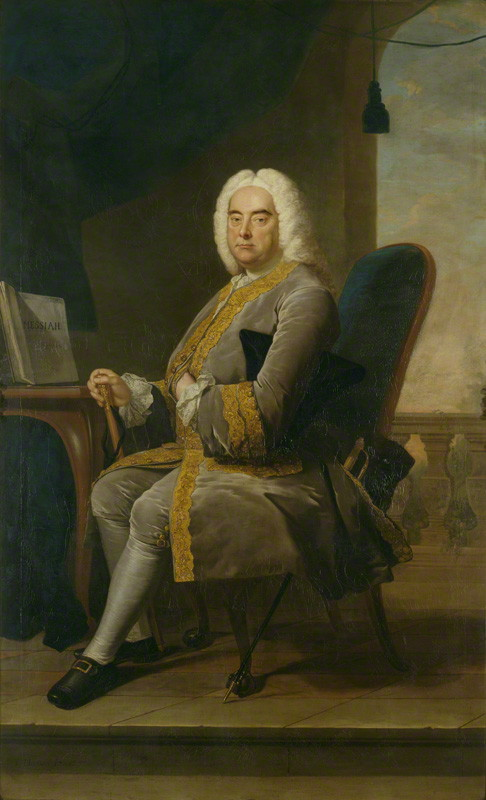
Portrait of George Frideric Handel by Thomas Hudson, 1756

"The Arrival of the Queen of Sheba", also known as "The Entrance of the Queen of Sheba" and "The Entry of the Queen of Sheba", is the sinfonia that opens Act III of George Frideric Handel's 1749 oratorio Solomon. It is marked allegro and scored for two oboes and strings. It is now usually performed separately as a concert piece, and as such has become one of Handel's most famous works.

== Description ==
Handel - Arrival of the Queen of Sheba
Performance by the Advent Chamber Orchestra

"The Arrival of the Queen of Sheba" is one of two instrumental movements in Solomon, an oratorio by George Frideric Handel written in May and June 1748 and premiered on 17 March 1749. Scored for two oboes, strings and continuo, it is the sinfonia which opens Act III, the only act in which Sheba appears, and it depicts the bustling preparations for her arrival rather than that entry itself. It is marked allegro, and features lively violin passages and contrasting solos from the two oboes. Its modern title was apparently bestowed on it by Sir Thomas Beecham; certainly, Handel did not use that title, the surviving wordbook simply calling it "Sinfony".

== Sources ==
Handel's contemporary William Boyce said that he "takes other men's pebbles, and polishes them into diamonds"; "The Arrival of the Queen of Sheba" is considered a notable example of this accomplishment. It incorporates music taken from the allegro of a concerto in Telemann's Tafelmusik, and from a keyboard gigue by Georg Muffat. The main theme, however, came originally from the ritornello of an aria in Giovanni Porta's opera Numitore. Handel adapted this first for a trio for two clarinets and corno da caccia, then as a sinfonia probably intended for some other work now unknown, improving the rhythm of the piece each time. The completed sinfonia seems to have found its final place in Solomon at a late stage in that work's gestation.

== Reception ==
Though Solomon as a whole is today rarely performed, "The Arrival of the Queen of Sheba" has been a very popular piece through the 20th and 21st centuries, being, for example, frequently played at wedding ceremonies. It was first recorded by Sir Thomas Beecham in 1933, and was often programmed by him as a concert piece. It made a very prominent appearance in the 2012, being played during the opening ceremony of the London Olympic Games, and another in 2023 as part of the coronation service of Charles III. Today it is one of Handel's best-known compositions.
