= Will of George Frideric Handel =

Will and testament of Baroque composer

George Frideric Handel (23 February 1685 – 14 April 1759) wrote his will over a number of years and with a number of codicils. Handel created the first version of his will with nine years to live, and completed his will (with the final codicil) three days before his death. Handel's will begins with the following text:

In the Name of God Amen.
I George Frideric Handel considering the Uncertainty of human Life doe make this my Will in manner following
Viz.
...

== Parts of the will ==
The following table documents the dates of the original will and the four codicils, as well as the witness statements at the conclusion of each part of the will.

Date	Part	Witness statement
1 June 1750	Original will	In wittness whereof I have here unto set my hand this 1 day of June 1750. GEORGE FREDERIC HANDEL
6 August 1756	Codicil	In witness whereof I Have hereunto set my hand and seal, this sixth day of August, one thousand seven hundred and fifty-six. GEORGE FREDERIC HANDEL. On the day and year above written, this codicil was read over to the said George Frideric Handel, and was by him signed and published in our presence. Tho. Harris. John Hetherington.
22 March 1757	Codicil	In witness whereof I have hereunto set my hand, the twenty-second day of March, one thousand seven hundred and fifty-seven. GEORGE FREDERIC HANDEL. On the day and year above written, this codicil was read over to the said George Frideric Handel, and was by him signed and published in our presence. Tho. Harris. John Hetherington.
4 August 1757	Codicil	In witness whereof I have hereunto set my hand, this fourth day of August, one thousand seven hundred and fifty-seven. GEORGE FREDERIC HANDEL. On the day and year above written, this codicil was read over to the said George Frideric Handel, and was by him signed and published in our presence. Tho. Harris. John Maxwell.
11 April 1759	Codicil	In witness whereof I have hereunto set my hand and seal, this eleventh day of April, 1759. G. F. HANDEL. This codicil was read over to the said George Frideric Handel, and by him signed and sealed, in the presence, on the day and year above written, of us, A. S. Rudd. J. Christopher Smith.

== Handel's will ==
The contents of each part of Handel's will are detailed in the following table. Note that where quotes have been supplied from the will, the original spelling, punctuation and capitalisations have been reproduced. The Item column gives the precise ordering of each bequest in Handel's will.

Will date	Item	Recipient	Bequest	Notes
1 June 1750	1	Peter le Blond	"my Clothes and Linnen"	Peter le Blond was Handel's servant.
1 June 1750	2	Peter le Blond	300 pounds sterling	Bequests to le Blond were not remitted as he died before Handel.
1 June 1750	3	Handel's other servants	"a year Wages"	
1 June 1750	4	Christopher Smith	"My large harpsichord, my little House Organ, my Musick Books"	
1 June 1750	5	Christopher Smith	500 pounds sterling	
1 June 1750	6	James Hunter	500 pounds sterling	
1 June 1750	7	Christian Gottlieb Handel	100 pounds sterling	Christian (who lived in Copenhagen) was a grandson of Handel's brother Karl.
1 June 1750	8	Magister Christian August Rotth	100 pounds sterling	Handel's cousin in Halle.
1 June 1750	9	Widow of George Taust Jr.	300 pounds sterling	Handel's aunt was the widow of George Taust Jr (pastor of Giebichenstein near Halle). The bequest was never remitted as the widow died before Handel's death.
1 June 1750	10	Widow of Taust's six children	1,200 pounds sterling	Each of the six children to get 200 pounds. (One child died before Handel's death.)
1 June 1750	11	Johanna Fridericia Floerken	"All the rest and residue of my Estate in Bank Annuities, 1746, sft. sub. or whatsoever kind or nature"	Johanna (of Gotha in Saxony—born Michaelsen in Halle) was Handel's niece. The entry in the will also made her sole executor of Handel's will.
6 August 1756	12	Peter le Blond	200 pounds sterling	In addition to previous bequest.
6 August 1756	13	Christopher Smith	1,500 pounds sterling	In addition to previous bequest.
6 August 1756	14	Christian Gottlieb Handel	200 pounds sterling	In addition to previous bequest.
6 August 1756	15	Magister Christian August Rotth's widow	100 pounds sterling	In addition to previous bequest. Magister Christian August Rotth had died subsequent to Handel's will of 1750. Handel wrote that if Rotth's widow should die, her children should be given the money.
6 August 1756	16	Widow of Taust's five children	1,500 pounds sterling	As the widow and one of her children had died since Handel's will of 1750, Handel requested the original 1,200 pounds (to the children) plus the original 300 pounds (to the widow) be divided amongst the remaining five children (300 pounds each).
6 August 1756	17	Thomas Morrell	200 pounds sterling	Doctor Thomas Morrell of Turnham Green.
6 August 1756	18	Newburgh Hamilton	100 pounds sterling	Hamilton (of Old Bond Street) assisted Handel in adjusting the words in some of Handel's compositions.
6 August 1756	19	George Amyant	200 pounds sterling	With the 1756 codicil, Handel made George Amyant, Esquire, of Lawrence Pountney Hill co-executor (along with Handel's niece) of his will.
22 March 1757	20	John Duburk	500 pounds sterling	Duburk was Peter le Blond's nephew. As le Blond had recently died, Handel gave the previously allocated 500 pounds to Duburk.
22 March 1757	21	Thomas Bramwell	30 pounds sterling	Bramwell was Handel's servant. Handel stipulated that the money was only to be paid if Bramwell was still living with Handel at the time of Handel's death.
4 August 1757	22	Christianna Sussanna Handel	300 pounds sterling	Christian Gottlieb Handel had recently died, so Handel bequeathed his already allocated 300 pounds to Christianna (who lived at Goslar).
4 August 1757	23	Rahel Sophia Handel	300 pounds sterling	Rahel was another sister of Christian Gottlieb Handel, and lived at Pless near Teschen in Silesia.
4 August 1757	24	John Rich, Esquire	"my great organ that stands at the Theatre Royal, in Covent Garden"	
4 August 1757	25	Charles Jennens, Esquire	"two pictures, the old man's head and the old woman's head, done by Denner"	Balthasar Dennar painted several portraits of Handel, but nothing is known of the paintings mentioned in Handel's will.
4 August 1757	26	— Granville, Esquire	"the landskip, a view of the Rhine, done by Rembrandt, and another, by the same hand, which he made me a present some time ago"	The first name is illegible, but is Bernard Granville of Holles Street and Calwich Abbey, Staffordshire.
4 August 1757	27	Foundling Hospital	"a fair copy of the score, and all parts of my oratorio called the Messiah"	
11 April 1759	28	Governors or trustees of the Society for the Support of Decayed Musicians and their Families	1,000 pounds sterling	"to be disposed of in the most benenficial manner for the objects of that charity".
11 April 1759	29	George Amyand	200 pounds sterling	In addition to previous bequest.
11 April 1759	30	Thomas Harris, Esquire	300 pounds sterling	Thomas Harris of Lincolns Inn Fields.
11 April 1759	31	John Hetherington	100 pounds sterling	"John Hetherington, of First Fruits Office, in the Middle Temple".
11 April 1759	32	James Smyth	500 pounds sterling	James Smyth of Bond Street was present at Handel's funeral and wrote a long account of it to another of Handel's friends, Bernard Granville.
11 April 1759	33	Mathew Dubourg	100 pounds sterling	Mathew Dubourg was a musician.
11 April 1759	34	Thomas Bramwell	70 pounds sterling	In addition to previous bequest.
11 April 1759	35	Benjamin Martyn	50 guineas	
11 April 1759	36	John Belchar	50 guineas	John Belchar of Sun Court Threadneedle Street was a surgeon.
11 April 1759	37	John de Bourk	"all my wearing-apparel"	John de Bourk was Handel's servant.
11 April 1759	38	John Gowland	50 pounds sterling	John Cowland of New Bond Street was an apothecary.
11 April 1759	39		600 pounds sterling (maximum)	For use by the will's executor to build a monument to Handel in Westminster Abbey.
11 April 1759	40	Mrs Palmer	100 pounds sterling	The widow of Mr Palmer of Chelsea.
11 April 1759	41	Handel's maid-servants	One year's wages	"over and above what shall be due to them at the time of my death".
11 April 1759	42	Mrs Mayne	50 guineas	Mrs Mayne was a widow and the sister of the late Mr. Batt.
11 April 1759	43	Mrs Downalan	50 guineas	Mrs Downalan or Donnellan of Charles Street Berkeley Square, one of two daughters of Nehemiah Donnellan, Lord Chief Baron of the Exchequer in Ireland, and his wife Martha.
11 April 1759	44	Mr Reiche	200 pounds sterling	Mr Reiche was the Secretary of the affairs of Hanover.

== Handel's funeral ==
In the final codicil to his will (item 39 in the above table), Handel expressed a desire to be buried in the following manner:

I hope I have the permission of the Dean and Chapter of Westminster to be buried in Westminster Abbey, in a private manner, at the discretion of my executor, Mr. Amyand; and I desire that my said executor may have leave to erect a monument for me there, and that any sum not exceeding six hundred pounds, be expended for that purpose, at the discretion of my said executor.

— G.F.Handel

Handel was buried in the south wing of Westminster Abbey, and his funeral took place on Friday 20 April 1759. The funeral service was performed by Dr. Zachary Pearce (Bishop of Rochester), and took place in the presence of more than 3,000 visitors. The choirs of the Chapel Royal, St. Paul's Cathedral, and Westminster Abbey sang the Funeral Anthem of William Croft.

== See also ==
- George Frideric Handel
- Letters and writings of George Frideric Handel
