= Letters and writings of George Frideric Handel =

Few of the letters and writings of George Frideric Handel remain today—certainly far fewer than remain for other major composers. Handel wrote relatively few letters and kept no diary, yet those letters that do remain provide insight into the various aspects of Handel's life. One reason for the small number of surviving letters is that Handel did not hold any office that would require the collecting and saving of his records and writings.

All remaining letters and writings maintain a uniformly polite tone. A typical complimentary closing (used in many letters) was: "Sr, Your most obliged and most humble servant, GEORGE FRIDERIC HANDEL".

The letter dated 30 September 1749 is reproduced in the pdf document cited at its entry below.

== Letters and writings ==
The following table lists the known letters and writings of Handel. Note that where quotes have been supplied from the letters, the original spelling, punctuation and capitalisations have been reproduced.

Date	Written in	To	Summary
18 March 1704	German	Johann Mattheson	Handel states that he enjoys pleasant conversation with Mattheson, and that such conversation would be possible when Mattheson becomes indispensable at the Opera. Handel expresses a desire to meet Mattheson prior to his (Mattheson's) departure (probably to Hamburg).
End of July 1711	French	Andreas Roner	Handel asks Roner to convey compliments to Monsieur Hughes, and states that he will write to Hughes at the earliest opportunity. Handel expresses a desire to receive a poem written by Hughes. Handel states that he is making some progress with the French language.
29 June 1716	English	Mr John G—	Handel (having 500 pounds of South Sea Company stock) states that the dividend on the stock (at "next August") should be paid to Mr Thomas Carbonnel. (The full surname of the recipient has been removed from the manuscript.)
20 February 1719	French	Michael Dietrich Michaelsen	(Michaelsen married Handel's sister, Dorothea Sophia.) Handel explains his delay in visiting Michaelsen on pressing affairs, assures that he will soon visit, and makes enquiries as to his (Handel's) "Mama". Handel states that he will be inconsolable if he will not be able to extend his imminent visit (in recompense for his delay). Handel apologises for (and is ashamed about) a delayed delivery of pewter—stating that the merchant at Magdeburg has not honoured his draft. Handel thanks Michaelsen for the good wishes that he sent for the New Year, and wishes that the Almighty may shower prosperity on Michaelsen and his family. (As Dorothea had died the previous year,) Handel hopes that the Almighty will heal, with his precious benediction, the deep wound inflicted on Michaelsen; and states that he shall always remember the kindness that Michaelsen showed to Dorothea. Finally, Handel asks Michaelsen to present his compliments to Mr. Rotth and to all their friends. (Magister Christian Roth was Handel's cousin.)
24 February 1719	French	Johann Mattheson	Handel writes that he is in accordance with Mattheson's views on Solmisation (a system of attributing a distinct syllable to each note in a musical scale), and with the lack of usefulness of the Greek musical modes in "modern music" (of Handel's time). On an unknown point, Handel states that he has not had enough time to give the topic the concentration it deserves, but promises to do so.
14 November 1720	English		The preface to Handel's edition of Suites de pieces pour le Clavecin. Handel's words in full are: "I have been obliged to publish Some of the following Lessons, because Surrepticious and incorrect Copies of them had got Abroad. I have added several new ones to make the Work more usefull, which if it meets with a favourable Reception; I will Still proceed to publish more, reckoning it my duty, with my Small Talent, to serve a Nation from which I have receiv'd so Generous a Protection".
End of 1720	English	King George I	Handel writes to the king to present his opera Radamisto. Handel flatters the monarch: "I have been still the more encouraged to this, by the particular Approbation You Majesty has been pleased to give to the Musick of this Drama". The letter was addressed "The King's Most Excellent Majesty", and the complimentary closing of the letter was "SIR, Your Majesty's Most Devoted, Most Obedient, And most Faithful Subject and Servant,".
February 1725	English	The Right Honourable The Lords; Spiritual and Temporal in Parliament	Handel writes that he was born "at Halle, in Saxony, out of His Majesty's Allegiance", but being of the Protestant religion, and having "given Testimony of his Loyalty and Fidelity to His Majesty", he requested that his name be added to the bill 'An Act for Naturalisating Louis Sechehaye'. (The king passed the act into law on 20 February 1727 and Handel was made a British subject. See here for more details.)
22 June 1725	French	Michael Dietrich Michaelsen	Handel writes to admit himself culpable in not having fulfilled his promised duties to Michaelsen. Handel acknowledges and thanks Michaelsen's kindness shown to his (Handel's) mother. Handel requests that Michaelsen send news from time to time, and explains that his desire to visit has been delayed. Handel states that he would be flattered if Michaelsen would grant him a corner in his memory, and pays humble respects to Michaelsen's wife (Michaelsen remarried following the death of Handel's sister). Lastly, Handel embraces tenderly his dear god-daughter and the rest of his family, and gives his compliments "to all our friends of both sexes".
11 March 1729	French	Michael Dietrich Michaelsen	Handel thanks Michaelsen for his correspondence and explains that news is a great comfort in his travels. Handel details that all Michaelsen need do is "address the letters always to Mr. Joseph Smith, Banker, at Venice...who will forward them to me at the different places where I shall be in Italy". Handel expresses joy that Michaelsen and his family are in perfect health, and looks forward to embracing them (in a trip planned for the next July).
19 June 1730	French	Francis Colman	(Francis Colman wrote the libretto of Handel's Ariadne.) Handel writes concerning the engaging of the contralto Sgra. Merighi, and that a soprano needed to be sourced from Italy. Handel promises to write to similar effect to a Mr. Swinny, and further recommends that the soprano to be sourced must also be able to play men's parts in the opera. Handel asks Colman not to mention "in the contracts as to first, second or third rôles because that upsets us in the choice of Drama and causes great inconvenience". Finally, Handel requests assistance in getting "a man and a woman for next season which begins in October this year and ends in July 1731...".
27 October 1730	French	Francis Colman	Handel thanks Colman for his efforts in engaging Sr. Senesino, and mentions that of the fourteen hundred guinea hiring fee, one hundred guineas has already been paid to Senesino in the twelve days since his arrival. Further, as Sigra Pisani has not arrived, and as the season is well advanced, Handel advises that "we will do without another woman from Italy this year...". Handel writes that he is obliged that Colman thought of Sigra Madalena Pieri as a woman "who can do men's parts", but that the present company of five is adequate, and that substitutes have been found for the rest. Finally, Handel thanks and acknowledges his gratitude to Colman for his work in acquiring singers as "the Court and the Nobility have at present a company to their liking".
23 February 1731	German	Michael Dietrich Michaelsen	Handel writes to thank Michaelsen for "the care that you have taken in burying my Mother according to her last wishes". Stating that he cannot stop his tears, Handel writes that his mother's memory will stay with him until he is reunited with her "after this life". He promises to show his gratitude to Michaelsen with "deeds as well as with words". Handel continues with thanks to a list of people, and states that he will keep "as a highly treasured memorial" printed material that was sent to him. Finally, Handel offers condolences on the death of Michaelsen's brother-in-law.
10 August 1731	French	Michael Dietrich Michaelsen	Handel again thanks Michaelsen for the pains he took over the burial of his (Handel's) mother, and thanks him for the "Funeral oraisons" that he sent. Handel promises to partly repay his obligations to Michaelsen, and closes by sending his respects and compliments to Michaelsen's wife, his (Handel's) god-daughter, and the rest of the Michaelsen's family.
21 August 1733	German	Michael Dietrich Michaelsen	Handel thanks Michaelsen for his previous letter, and for the enclosure to do with relations in Gotha. Handel expresses deep gratitude for the pains Michaelsen took "with regards to the receipts and expenditure from July 1 last year 1732, to July 30, 1733, over the house which my mother left". Due to pressing affairs, Handel regrets that he cannot visit to see the house. Handel thanks Michaelsen for remembering his (Handel's) mother's last wish regarding her tombstone. From accounts sent to him, Handel observes that Frau Händelin pays 6 Reichstaler a year in rent, and advises Michaelsen that he would like her not to have to pay any rent, and that she can live in the house for as long as she likes. Handel returns "the account with my signature" and promises not to forget his "obligations in this respect". Finally, Handel sends greetings to Michaelsen's wife, the Taust family, and all their friends.
27 August 1734	English	(unknown correspondent)	Handel's writing in full: "At my arrival in Town from the Country, I found myself honour'd of your kind invitation. I am very sorry that by the situation of my affairs I see my self deprived of receiving that Pleasure being engaged with Mr Rich to carry on the Operas in Covent Garden. I hope at your return to Town, Sir, I shall make up this Loss. Mean while I beg you to be perswaded of the sincere Respect with which I am Sir Your most obedient and most humble Servant...".
End of August 1734	English	Sir Wyndham Knatchbull	This letter is more-or-less a copy of the letter dated 27 August 1734.
29 July 1735	French	Johann Mattheson	(No translation available.)
28 July 1735	English	Charles Jennens	(Jennens became friends with Handel in 1735, and supported Handel faithfully at all times. Jennens prepared the libretto for many of Handel's works.) Handel thanks Jennens for his "very agreeable Letter with the inclosed Oratorio", and states that what he has read of the work has given him "a great deal of Satisfaction". Handel writes that the scheme of works for the next season is unknown, and that "the opera of Alcina is a writing out and shall be send according to your Direktion".
29 June 1736	English	Anthony, fourth Earl of Shaftesbury	Handel thanks his Lordship for his letter, and states that he finds "very just" the notions found in the enclosed "Part of My Lord Your Fathers Letter relating to Musick".
28 August 1736	French	Michael Dietrich Michaelsen	Handel writes that there is no one closer to his heart than his dear niece, so he finds the news agreeable that she is to marry "a person of such merit and so distinguished a character". Handel takes it as a sign of consideration that Michaelsen asked for his approbation, and states that his niece's good education will help to assure her happiness. Handel writes that he has taken the liberty of sending to her husband a gift in the form of "a gold watch of Delharmes, a gold chain and two seals, one of amethyst and one of onyx", and to his niece a present of "a diamond ring containing a single stone weighing something over seven grains, flawless and of the first water". Handel says that these presents will be addressed to Mr Sbüelen at Hamburg, and closes by expressing his obligations to Michaelsen and his wife.
29 December 1741	English	Charles Jennens	Handel thanks Jennens for his work on the oratorio Messiah, and states that not "one single Ticket at the Door" need be sold as "The Nobility did me the Honour to make amongst themselves a Subscription for 6 Nights, which did fill a Room of 600 Persons". Hoping to avoid vanity, Handel writes that "the Performance was received with a general Approbation", with (the soprano) Sigra Avolio pleasing "extraordinarily". Handel praises the "charming Room", the other voices and instruments, and their lead Mr. Dubourgh. Remarking on his own high spirits and good health, Handel states that "I exert my self on my Organ with more than usual success". Handel writes that he opened with the Allegro, Penseroso, and the Moderato, and assures Jennens that the "Words of the Moderato are vastly admired" by the audience which included: "the Flower of Ladyes of Distinction and other People of the greatest quality" and "Bishops, Deans, Heads of the Colledge, the most eminent People in the Law as the Chancellor, Auditor General, &ct". Handel praises the general treatment he has received in this "generous Nation", and mentions that a plan has already been proposed for more performances, with "My Lord Duc the Lord Lieutenant will easily obtain a longer Permission for me by His Majesty". Handel requests Jennens to insinuate his "most devoted Respects to My Lord and My Lady Shaftesbury", and his compliments to Sir Windham Knatchbull. In addition, Handel requests Jennens to present his (Handel's) "humble service to some other Patrons and friends of mine". After requesting news of Jennens' health and welfare, Handel mentions that he has heard news of the ill success of Jennens' "Opera's", although he (Handel) found the first opera to make him "very merry all along my journey". Handel quotes (in French) the words of a "certain noble man" regarding "the second Opera, call'd Penelope".
9 September 1742	English	Charles Jennens	Handel explains that he had intended a visit to Jennens on his way from Ireland to London to give a verbal account of "how well Your Messiah was received", instead however, Handel enclosed a written account of the oratorio by "no less than the Bishop of Elphim (A Nobleman very learned in musick)". Handel promises to "send the printed Book of the Messiah to Mr Sted" on behalf of Jennens. Handel reserves the account of his successes in Ireland until he meets Jennens in London, however he does state that the notion that "the Direction of the Opera next winter is committed to his care, is groundless". Handel professes that he is not sure if he will continue with Oratorios, except that in Ireland a large subscription is already planned for that purpose in 12 months time. Handel regrets not stopping to see Lord Guernsey during his travels, and states that it is a long time until November, which is the time he hopes to see Jennens in London.
9 June 1744	English	Charles Jennens	Handel writes that he has derived great pleasure in hearing of Jennens' safe arrival in the country, and of Jennens' improved health. As Jennens has encouraged Handel's Messiah undertakings, Handel gives an account of his engagement of the Opera House in the Haymarket, as well as the singers: Sigra Francesina, Turner Robinson, John Beard, Thomas Reinhold, Bernard Gates and his sons, and "several of the best Chorus Singers from the Choirs". Handel hopes that Susannah Maria Cibber will sing for him, and hopes to get leave for her from Mr Riches "(with whom she is engaged to play in Covent Garden House)". Lastly, Handel requests Jennens to send him the first act of the new oratorio (Belshazzar).
19 July 1744	English	Charles Jennens	Handel thanks Jennens for the first act of Belshazzar, agrees with the long length of the first act (and the shorter subsequent acts), and requests Jennens to send the other acts. Handel also requests that Jennens "point out these passages in the Messiah which you think require altering".
21 August 1744	English	Charles Jennens	Handel thanks Jennens for the second act of Belshazzar, states that he is pleased with it, and that he will do his best to do it justice. Handel finishes by stating that he is impatient to receive the third act.
13 September 1744	English	Charles Jennens	Handel writes that Jennens' "excellent Oratorio" (Belshazzar) has given him great delight in setting it to music, that it is "a noble piece, very grand and uncommon", and it has given him the opportunity of "some very particular Ideas" and "great Chorus". Handel entreats Jennens to send him the last act so that "I may regulate my self the better as to the Length of it", and finishes the letter by stating he is obliged to Jennens "for so generous a Present".
2 October 1744	English	Charles Jennens	Handel writes that he has received the third act of the oratorio (Belshazzar) with a great deal of pleasure and states that it is "very fine and sublime". Handel then states that the work is too long, and would last four hours when set to music. Because of the length, Handel suggests various alterations, and hopes that Jennens will visit him in London next winter. Handel writes that he has a good set of singers: S. Francesina (Nitocris), Miss Anastasia Robinson (Cyrus), Mrs Cibber (Daniel), Mr Beard (Belshazzar), Mr Reinhold (Tobias), and "a good Number of Choir Singers for the Chorus's". Handel proposes "24 Nights to perform this season on Saturdays, but in Lent on Wednesdays or frydays", and that "I shall open on 3d of November".
30 September 1749	English	Charles Jennens	In response to Jennens' request, Handel renders an opinion on the specifications for an organ to be built by Mr Richard Bridge.
24 February 1750	English	(To the keeper of the Ordnance Office)	Handel's words in full: "I having received the permission of the Artillery Kettle Drums for my use in the Oratorio's in this season; I beg you would conseign them to the Bearer of this Mr. Frideric Smith".
25 December 1750	French	Georg Philipp Telemann	Handel writes that he was about to travel from the Hague to London when Telemann's letter was delivered to him (by Mr Passerini). Handel continues by saying that he heard Passerini's wife sing and is "convinced of her rare merit". As the Passerinis are travelling to Scotland for six months of concerts, followed by a trip to London, Handel promises to render them any service he can, and states that Mrs Passerini "could perfect herself in the English Language" during their travels. Handel promises Telemann that he will always reciprocate Telemann's kindness and that "Your obliging manners and your reputation have made a great impression in my heart and in my mind". Handel then thanks Telemann "for the beautiful work "du sisteme d'intervalles" which you have kindly sent me". Handel finishes by complimenting Telemann on his perfect state of health (despite his "fairly advanced age"), and, remarking on Telemann's passion for exotic plants, sends a present of a case of "choice flowers...of charming rarity" with the remark "if what they say is true, you will have the best plants in all England".
20 September 1754	French	Georg Philipp Telemann	Handel begins by reporting that the captain Jean Carsten sent news to him that Telemann was dead, but goes on to state his joy in hearing at a later stage (from the same captain) that the original news was false. Telemann had previously drawn out a list of exotic plants for Handel to procure, and Handel writes that he has great pleasure in announcing that he has obtained almost all of them, and that they will be shipped "by the first boat which leaves here". Handel finishes by hoping the present will be agreeable to Telemann, and by requesting that Telemann send him news of the state of his health.
11 April 1759	English		Handel's will—which begins: In the Name of God Amen. I George Fréderic Handel considering the Uncertainty of human Life doe make this my Will in manner following...

== See also ==
- George Frideric Handel
- Will of George Frideric Handel
- List of compositions by George Frideric Handel
- Handel Reference Database
