= Melinda Paulsen =

American singer

- Born: 1964 (age 61–62); Indiana, USA
- Occupations: Mezzo-soprano; Contralto; Academic
- Organizations: Hochschule für Musik Mainz; Musikhochschule Frankfurt
- Awards: ARD International Music Competition

Melinda Paulsen (born 1964) is an American mezzo-soprano and contralto who has appeared mostly in Germany, with a focus on concert singing. She has been an academic voice teacher at the Musikhochschule Frankfurt.

== Early life and education ==
Paulsen grew up in Indiana. She studied first at Swarthmore College in Pennsylvania, then from 1988 in Germany at the Musikhochschule München with Daphne Evangelatos, graduating in 1991.

== Career ==
Paulsen was engaged by the opera studio of the Bavarian State Theatre, where she received instructions by Astrid Varnay and participated in opera productions of the State Theatre. In 1992, she achieved 2nd prize at the ARD International Music Competition. She has appeared at international Festivals such as Rheingau Musik Festival, Halle Handel Festival, and Bregenz Festival. She has collaborated with conductors such as Roberto Abbado, Enoch zu Guttenberg, Marek Janowski and Helmuth Rilling, and has appeared in concert halls such as the Wiener Musikverein, the Leipzig Gewandhaus, and the Konzerthaus Berlin.

Paulsen made the first recordings of certain works by Nadia Boulanger and Ethel Smyth, including in 1993 some of Boulanger's songs (with pianist Angela Gassenhuber), and Smyth's four songs for mezzo-soprano and chamber ensemble. In 1998, she recorded the role of Storge in Handel's last oratorio Jephtha with the Maulbronner Kammerchor conducted by Jürgen Budday, alongside Julian Podger in the title role. A reviewer noted her strong, dramatic, vivid performance as the mother who "learns she will lose her daughter".

Paulsen was a lecturer of voice at the Hochschule für Musik Mainz at the Mainz University from 1997 to 2003. Since 2003, she is a professor of voice at the Musikhochschule Frankfurt.
