= Alexander Balus =

1748 oratorio by G. F. Handel

George Frideric Handel

Alexander Balus (HWV 65) is an oratorio by George Frideric Handel, named after its title character, the Seleucid king Alexander Balas. The work has three acts and was written in English. The period of the story is from 150 B.C to 145 B.C. The libretto is by Thomas Morell after the biblical book of 1 Maccabees.

Fourth in a series of English military oratorios, following Joshua and the success of Judas Maccabaeus, celebrating the victories of the Hanoverian monarchy over the Jacobite uprisings, the work moves from celebrations of military success in the first act to personal tragedies in the last. Alexander Balus was composed in the summer of 1747 and premiered on 23 March 1748 at Covent Garden Theatre, London, with Caterina Galli singing the title role, Thomas Lowe as Jonathan, and Thomas Reinhold as Ptolemee. In 1754 Handel made a revision to his work and changed the leading role, the king Alexander, to a soprano instead of an alto.

== Dramatis personae ==
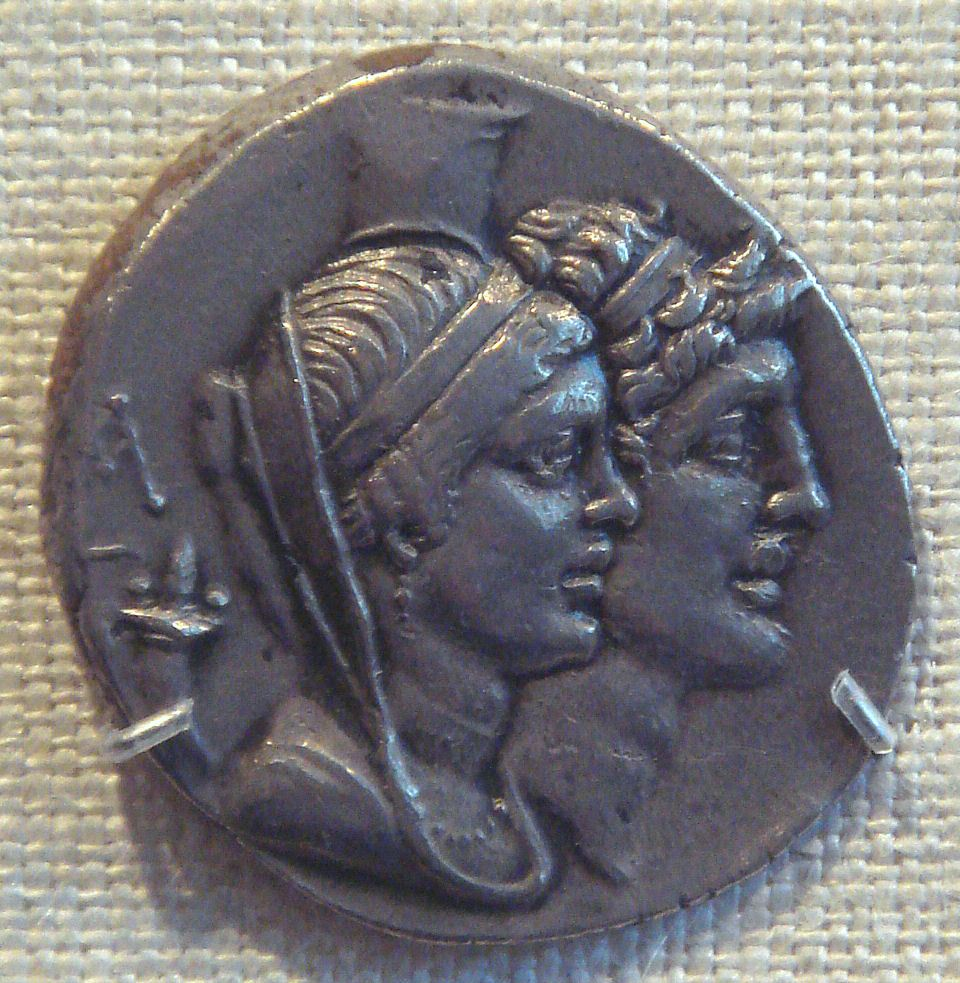
Alexander Balus and Cleopatra Thea

Roles, voice types, and premiere cast
| Role | Voice type | Premiere cast, 23 March 1748 |
|---|---|---|
| Alexander Balus | alto | Caterina Galli |
| Ptolemee, King of Egypt | bass | Thomas Reinhold |
| Jonathan, Chief of the Jews | tenor | Thomas Lowe |
| Cleopatra Thea, Daughter to Ptolemee | soprano | Signora Casarini |
| Aspasia, her confidante | soprano | Signora Sibilla |
| A Sycophant Courtier | tenor | |
| Messenger | tenor | |
| Another Messenger | bass | |
Chorus of Israelites, Chorus of Asiates, Chorus of ruffians

== Synopsis ==
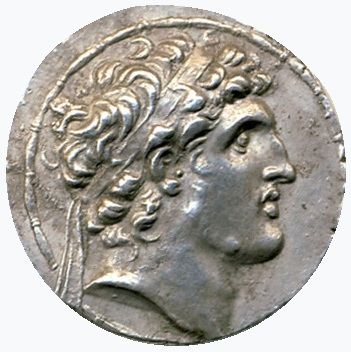
Alexander Balus

Act 1

Alexander claimed the throne of Syria by killing Demetrius the king. Alexander then befriends the Jews and their leader Jonathan Maccabaeus. The king of Egypt, Ptolemee, congratulates Alexander and celebrates his successes by awarding him his daughter, Cleopatra Thea (not the famous Cleopatra of Shakespeare and Handel's opera Giulio Cesare). The two fall in love.

Act 2

Alexander and Cleopatra are married. Alexander is led to believe by a messenger that Jonathan plans to betray him after winning his friendship. It is then revealed that Ptolemee only arranged Alexander and Cleopatra's marriage to take Alexander's land and power. He plans to move his troops into Syria under the cover of nightfall to kidnap and kill the young leader.

Act 3

Cleopatra is kidnapped by Ptolemee’s ruffians and he intends to force her to marry another man. During Cleopatra's captivity, Ptolemee tries to break her allegiance to Alexander, but is unsuccessful. Alexander rushes off to war, while Jonathan stays behind, fearing the worst and doubting the power of Alexander's Syrian gods. Jonathan's intuition is confirmed when a messenger delivers the news that although they won three battles, Alexander and Ptolemee have been killed. Cleopatra commends herself to the goddess, Isis, and retires to ‘some peaceful shore’. Jonathan reflects on the tragedy, believing that if everyone would have acknowledged the true God, none of this would have happened.

== Musical features ==
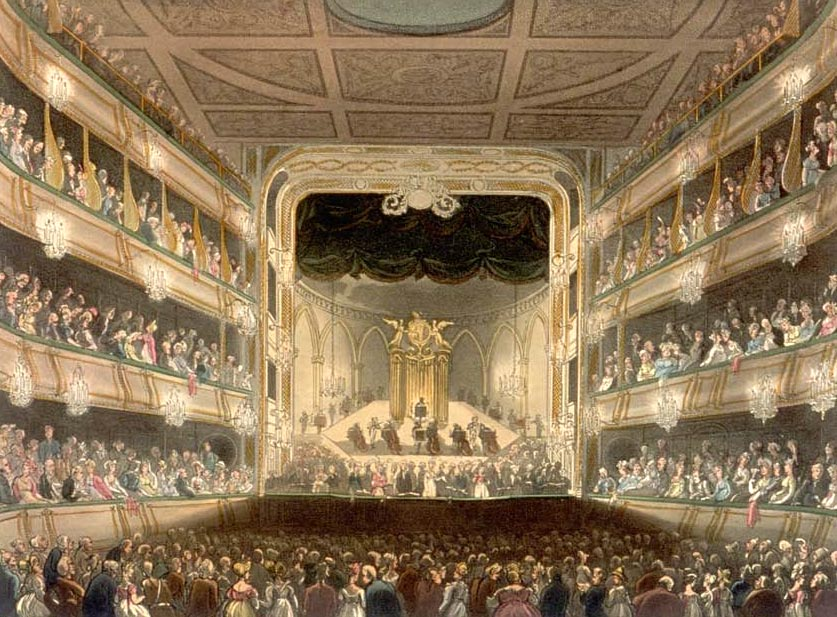
Covent Garden Theatre where Alexander Balus was first performed

Varied and characterful choruses are a feature of the work, the choruses for the Jews being of a serious and contrapuntal quality, in contrast to the simpler, more down to earth and cheerful choruses for the "Asiates". In the massive, complex chorus "O calumny", the chorus comments and moralizes on the action in the manner of choruses in ancient Greek tragedy. The role of Cleopatra is given a series of arias remarkable both for their originality of orchestration and their expressive quality. Her first aria "Hark he strikes the golden lyre" is scored, very unusually, for two flutes, harp and mandolin over a background of pizzicato strings to produce an exotic and exquisite effect. Her final sequence of arias as she hears of her husband's defeat and death and prepares herself for suicide achieve a power and poignancy equal to that in many more famous operas.

== List of musical numbers ==
=== Act 1 ===
Orchestra

- Overture

Chorus of Asiates

- Flushed with conquest, fir’d by Mithra

Alexander

- Recit. Thus far ye glorious partners of the war

Jonathan

- Air. Great Author of this harmony
- Recit. And thus let happy Egypt’s king

Ptolemee

- Air. Thrice happy the Monarch, whom nations contend

Cleopatra

- Recit. Congratulations to our father’s friend
- Air. Hark he strikes the golden lyre

Alexander

- Recit. Be it my chief ambition there to rise
- Air. Fair virtue shall charm me

Chorus of Asiates

- Ye happy nations round

Alexander

- Recit. My Jonathan, didst thou mark
- Air. Oh what restless charms

Cleopatra

- Air. Subtle Love, with fancy viewing Aspasia, I know not what to call
- Air. How happy should we mortals prove?

Aspasia

- Recit. Check not the pleasing accent of thy tongue
- Air. So shall the sweet attractive smile

Cleopatra

- Recit. How blissful state

Ceopatra/Aspasi

- Duet. O, what pleasures, past expressing

Jonathan

- Recit. Why hangs heavy gloom upon the brow

Alexander

- Air. Heroes may boast their mighty deeds
- Air. Mighty Love now calls to arm

Jonathan

- Recit. Ye sons of Judah, with high festivals proclaim
- Air. Great god, from whom all blessings spring

Chorus of Israelites

- These are thy gifts, almighty king
- To thee let grateful Judah sing

=== Act 2 ===
Alexander

- Air. Kind Hope, thou universal friend

Jonathan

- Recit. Long, long and happy live the king

Alexander

- Air. O Mithra, with thy brightest beams

Sycophant Courtier

- Stay my dread sovereign

Jonathan

- Air. Hateful man!

Chorus

- O calumny, on virtue waiting

Cleopatra

- Recit. Ah! Whence these dire forebodings of the mind?
- Air. Tost from the thought to thought I rove

Aspasia

- Recit. Give to the winds, fair princess, these vain doubts
- Air. Love, glory, ambition

Ptolomee

- Recit. Thus far my wishes thrive
- Air. Virtue, thou ideal name

Jonathan

- Recit. Ye happy people

Jonathan and Chorus

- Triumph, Hymen, in the pair

Alexander

- Recit. Glad time, at length, has reach’d the happy point

Cleopatra/Alexander

- Duet. Hail, wedded love, mysterious law

Chorus of Asiates

- Hymen, fair Urania’s son

=== Act 3 ===
Orchestra

- Sinfonia

Cleopatra

- Recit. Tis true, instructive nature seldom points
- Air. Here amid the shady woods

Ruffians/Cleopatra/

- Recit. Mistaken queen! The Gods and Ptolemee

Alexander

- Recit. Ah! Was it not my Cleopatra’s voice?
- Air. Pow’rful guardians of al nature

Jonathan

- Recit. Treach’ry, o king

Alexander

- Air. Fury, with red sparkling eyes

Asparsia

- Recit. Gods! Can there be a more afflicting sight
- Air. Strange reverse of human fate

Jonathan

- Air. The God, who made the radiant sun

Chorus of Issaelites

- Sun, moon, and stars

Ptolomee

- Recit. Yes he was false, my daughter
- Air. O sword, and thou all-daring hand

Cleopatra

- Recit. Shall Cleopatra ever smile again?

Messenger

- Ungrateful tidings to the royal ear

Cleopatra

- Air. O take me from this hateful light

Another Messenger

- Forgive, o queen, the messenger of ill

Cleopatra

- Recit. Calm thy soul, kind Isis
- Air. Convey me to some peaceful shore

Jonathan

- Recit. Mysterious are thy ways, o providence

Jonathan and Chorus

- Ye servants of th’ eternal King

=== Instrumentation ===
The work is scored for strings, two oboes, two trumpets, two horns, bassoon, two flutes, harp, mandolin, and continuo.

== Recording ==
With Lynne Dawson soprano, Michael George bass, Catherine Denley alto, Charles Daniels tenor, Claron McFadden soprano, The King's Consort, Choir of The King's Consort, New College Choir, Oxford, Robert King. Release date 2010. Hyperion CD:CDA67241/2
