= Julian Podger =

English tenor

- Born: 1966 (age 58–59); England
- Education: Trinity College, Cambridge
- Occupations: Tenor; Conductor

Julian Podger (born 1966) is an English tenor who has appeared mostly in concert in historically informed performance. He took part in the 2000 Bach Cantata Pilgrimage. He also sings in vocal ensembles, and directs his own ensemble, Trinity Baroque.

== Life and career ==
Born in England, Podger grew up in Kassel, Hesse, Germany. His sister, Rachel Podger, is an acclaimed violinist. He studied at Trinity College, Cambridge. He has sung with notable vocal ensembles such as Gothic Voices, a group for medieval music, and The Harp Consort. He founded his own ensemble Trinity Baroque while still studying in Cambridge.

On 10 August 1997, he appeared as a soloist at The Proms with the Monteverdi Choir and the Orchestre Révolutionnaire et Romantique, conducted by John Eliot Gardiner, performing vocal works by Schubert and Beethoven. Podger took part, as a soloist and member of the Monteverdi Choir, in the 2000 Bach Cantata Pilgrimage by Gardiner. He sang the role of the Evangelist in Bach's St John Passion and St Matthew Passion several times. In 1998, he recorded the title role in Handel's last oratorio Jephtha with the Maulbronner Kammerchor conducted by Jürgen Budday, alongside Emma Kirkby as Iphis and Melinda Paulsen as Storge. A reviewer noted his "well phrased and beautifully rounded performance" but missed the dark emotions of the character.

In 2010, he recorded an album Music for the Peace of Utrecht with Jos van Veldhoven and the Netherlands Bach Society, alongside Nicki Kennedy, William Towers, Wolfram Lattke and Peter Harvey, combining Handel's Utrecht Te Deum and Jubilate, HWV 279, and William Croft's Ode for the Peace of Utrecht (With Noise of Cannon), which was recorded for the first time.
