= Patrick Van Goethem =

Belgian countertenor (born 1969)

- Born: 1969; Aalst
- Occupation: Countertenor
- Organization: The Flanders Baroque Consort

Patrick Van Goethem (born 1969) is a Belgian countertenor, known for performing early music. He took part in the project Dieterich Buxtehude – Opera Omnia of Ton Koopman and the Amsterdam Baroque Orchestra & Choir to record the complete works of Dieterich Buxtehude.

== Early life ==
Patrick Van Goethem was born in Aalst, East Flanders, and began his education in the boys choir Schola Cantorum Cantate Domino under direction of Michaël Ghijs. He studied with Marie-Thérèse Maesen and Zeger Vandersteene, and later with Paul Esswood, Julia Hamari and Andreas Scholl.

== Career ==
Van Goethem has appeared mostly in festivals of early music in Germany, France and the Netherlands. Van Goethem sang Bach's Magnificat with Gustav Leonhardt and the Netherlands Bach Society at the Amsterdam Concertgebouw. With Reinhard Goebel and the Musica Antiqua Köln he sang in a Bach cantata project at the Festival Musica Antiqua Bruges. He appeared in Bach's St Matthew Passion in the Thomaskirche in Leipzig as part of the Bach Year 2000. In 2004, he recorded Bach's Ascension Oratorio and Easter Oratorio with the Bach Collegium Japan and Masaaki Suzuki, with concerts in Tokyo and Kobe. In 2005 he sang Bach's Mass in B minor with the Washington Bach Consort and J. Reilly Lewis. In 2009, he recorded the work live in Warsaw with Frans Brüggen, the Cappella Amsterdam, the Orchestra of the Eighteenth Century, Dorothee Mields, Johannette Zomer, Jan Kobow and Peter Kooy.

Van Goethem has taken part in the project Dieterich Buxtehude – Opera Omnia of Ton Koopman and the Amsterdam Baroque Orchestra & Choir to record the complete works of Dieterich Buxtehude, and including a European concert tour in 2007. He sang in Handel's Saul with Peter Neumann and the Collegium Cartusianum at the Göttingen International Handel Festival. With the Collegium Vocale Gent and the Combattimento Consort Amsterdam, conducted by Jan Willem de Vriend, he sang Purcell's Dido and Aeneas at the Amsterdam Concertgebouw. He appeared as Cyrus in Handel's Belshazzar with Jürgen Budday at the Maulbronner Schlosskonzerte. With conductor Enoch zu Guttenberg he performed in Antonio Vivaldi's Gloria and Juditha Triumphans at the Rheingau Musik Festival in 2007.

On the opera stage, he took part in the premiere of the opera Trans-Warhol of Philippe Schoeller in Geneva in 2007. Van Goethem founded the Baroque ensemble The Flanders Baroque Consort. He is a vocal teacher at the Music Academy of Middelkerke.
