= Maulbronn Chamber Choir =

German choir

- Also known as: Maulbronner Kammerchor
- Origin: Maulbronn, Baden-Württemberg, Germany
- Genres: Classical, Baroque, Early, Modern
- Occupation: Choir
- Years active: 1983-present
- Labels: K&K Verlagsanstalt
- Members: Soprano: Teresa Frick, Susanne Fuierer, Ute Gerteis, Henriette Autenrieth, Larissa Just, Hannah Glocker, Elisabeth Hofmann-Ehret, Ilka Hüftle, Katja Körtge, Susanne Laenger, Heidi Lenk, Veronika Miehlich, Anne Nonnenmann, Silke Vogelmann, Irene Vorreiter; Alto: Erika Budday, Mirjam Budday, Barbara Hirsch, Marianne Kodweiß, Roswitha Fydrich-Steiner, Kathrin Gölz, Margret Sanwald, Renate Secker, Angelika Stössel, Bettina van der Ham, Evelyn Witte; Tenor: Johannes Budday, Sebastian Fuierer, Andreas Gerteis, Ulrich Kiefner, Hartmut Meier, Mathias Michel, Konrad Mohl, Sebastian Thimm; Bass:: Ingo Andruschkewitsch, Karl Bihlmaier, Benjamin Hartmann, Jo Dohse, Bernhard Fräulin, Matthias Leeflang, Rainer Hirsch-Luipold, Eberhard Maier, Werner Pfeiffer, Felix Seibert, Conrad Schmitz; Founder & Conductor: Jürgen Budday
- Website: www.maulbronner-kammerchor.de

The Maulbronn Chamber Choir (German: "Maulbronner Kammerchor") was founded in 1983 and is directed by Jürgen Budday.

It took first place at the Baden-Württemberg Choir Competition in 1989 and 1997, second place at the 3rd German Choir Competition in Stuttgart in 1990, first prize at the 5th German Choir Competition in Regensburg in 1998 and most recently achievement level I "internationally excellent" together with a special prize for the best interpretation of a sacred choral work at the 11th International Chamber Choir Competition in Marktoberdorf as well as two first prizes at the 3rd International Choir Competition Malta 2009.

== Discography ==
=== Oratorios by G. F. Handel ===
Historically informed performances in English

- Jephtha - Oratorio in three acts. An historically informed performance in English with Emma Kirkby (Soprano), Melinda Paulsen (Mezzo-soprano), Charles Humphries (Countertenor), Julian Podger (Tenor), Stephen Varcoe (Bass), Maulbronn Chamber Choir, Barockorchester der Klosterkonzerte, Conductor: Jürgen Budday (1998, concert recording, Maulbronn Monastery Edition)
- Samson - Oratorio in three acts. An historically informed performance in English with Sinéad Pratschke, Michael Chance, Marc LeBrocq, Raimund Nolte, David Thomas, Maulbronn Chamber Choir, Barockorchester der Klosterkonzerte, Conductor: Jürgen Budday (1999, concert recording, Maulbronn Monastery Edition)
- Judas Maccabäus - Oratorio in three acts. An historically informed performance in English with Sinéad Pratschke (Soprano), Catherine King (Mezzo-soprano), Charles Humphries (Countertenor), Mark LeBrocq (Tenor), Christopher Purves (Bass), Maulbronn Chamber Choir, Musica Florea Prag, Conductor: Jürgen Budday (2000, concert recording, Maulbronn Monastery Edition)
- Saul - Oratorio in three acts. An historically informed performance in English with Nancy Argenta (Soprano), Laurie Reviol (Soprano), Michael Chance (Countertenor), Marc LeBrocq (Tenor), Michael Berner (Tenor), Stephen Varcoe (Bass), Steffen Balbach (Bass), Hannoversche Hofkapelle, Maulbronn Chamber Choir, Conductor: Jürgen Budday (2002, concert recording, Maulbronn Monastery Edition)
- Solomon - Oratorio in three acts. An historically informed performance in English with Nancy Argenta (Soprano), Laurie Reviol (Soprano), Michael Chance (Countertenor), Julian Podger (Tenor), Steffen Balbach (Bass), Hannoversche Hofkapelle, Maulbronn Chamber Choir, Conductor: Jürgen Budday (2004, concert recording, Maulbronn Monastery Edition)
- Belshazzar - Oratorio in three acts. An historically informed performance in English with Miriam Allan (Soprano), Michael Chance (Countertenor), Patrick Van Goethem (Countertenor), Mark Le Brocq (Tenor), Stephen Varcoe (Bass), Maulbronn Chamber Choir, Hannoversche Hofkapelle, Conductor: Jürgen Budday (2005, concert recording, Maulbronn Monastery Edition)
- Messiah - Complete recording of the English Oratorio HWV 56. Performed according to the traditions of the time with Miriam Allan (Soprano), Michael Chance (Countertenor), Mark Le Brocq (Tenor), Christopher Purves (Bass), Hanoverian Court Orchestra (Hannoversche Hofkapelle), Maulbronn Chamber Choir (Maulbronner Kammerchor), Conductor: Jürgen Budday (2006, concert recording, Maulbronn Monastery Edition)
- Der Messias (The Messiah) - Complete Recording Oratorio in three parts by George Frideric Handel in the arrangement of Wolfgang Amadeus Mozart. Performed according to the traditions of the time, sung in German, with Marlis Petersen (Soprano), Margot Oitzinger (Alto), Markus Schäfer (Tenor), Marek Rzepka (Bass), Hanoverian Court Orchestra (on period instruments), Maulbronn Chamber Choir, Conductor: Jürgen Budday (2006, concert recording, Maulbronn Monastery Edition)
- Joshua - Unedited version in English from 1748. Performed according to the traditions of the time with Miriam Allan (Soprano), David Allsopp (Countertenor), Mark LeBrocq (Tenor), James Rutherford (Bass), Hanoverian Court Orchestra (Hannoversche Hofkapelle), Maulbronn Chamber Choir (Maulbronner Kammerchor), Conductor: Jürgen Budday (2007, concert recording, Maulbronn Monastery Edition)
- Israel in Egypt - Unedited version in English from 1739. Performed according to the traditions of the time with Miriam Allan (Soprano), Sarah Wegener (Soprano), David Allsopp (Countertenor), Benjamin Hulett (Tenor), Steffen Balbach (Bass), Daniel Raschinsky (Bass), Hanoverian Court Orchestra (Hannoversche Hofkapelle), Maulbronn Chamber Choir (Maulbronner Kammerchor), Conductor: Jürgen Budday (2010, concert recording, Maulbronn Monastery Edition)
- Jephtha - Complete recording of the English Oratorio HWV 70. Performed according to the traditions of the time with Kirsten Blaise (Soprano), Annelie Sophie Müller (Mezzo-Soprano), David Allsopp (Countertenor), Benjamin Hulett (Tenor), Simon Bailey (Bass), Ensemble il capriccio (Baroque Orchestra), Maulbronn Chamber Choir (Maulbronner Kammerchor), Conductor: Jürgen Budday (2013, concert recording, Maulbronn Monastery Edition)

=== a cappella ===
- All meine Herzgedanken ~ Chormusik der Romantik, Maulbronn Chamber Choir, Conductor: Jürgen Budday 1991
- Tröste mich wieder ~ Geistliche Chormusik, Maulbronn Chamber Choir, Conductor: Jürgen Budday 1993
- From early dawn... until late at night, A daily musical routine according to the tradition of horary prayers with works by Orlando di Lasso, Joseph Rheinberger, Felix Mendelssohn Bartholdy, Rolf Schweizer, Johann H. Schein, Jozef Swider, Arvo Pärt, Sven D. Sandström, Max Reger, Maulbronn Chamber Choir, Conductor: Jürgen Budday 1999
- Du verwandelst meine Klage in einen Reigen ~ Geistliche Chormusik, Maulbronn Chamber Choir, Conductor: Jürgen Budday 2003
- Der Mensch lebt und bestehet ~ Geburt - Endlichkeit - Ewigkeit. Maulbronn Chamber Choir, Conductor: Jürgen Budday 2006
- Transeamus usque Bethlehem ~ Europäische Weihnachtslieder und Motetten, Maulbronn Chamber Choir, Conductor: Jürgen Budday 2008
- Die Nacht leuchtet wie der Tag, Maulbronn Chamber Choir, Conductor: Jürgen Budday 2010
- Liebe & Leid (Love & Sorrow), Maulbronn Chamber Choir, Conductor: Jürgen Budday 2014
- Von Gott ~ Zu Gott · Verheißungen und Gebete (From God ~ To God · Promises & Prayers), Maulbronn Chamber Choir, Conductor: Jürgen Budday 2016
