= Trinity Baroque =

Trinity Baroque is an English group of musicians who focus on the Renaissance and Baroque periods. Founded at Trinity College, Cambridge, they are formed of a pool of 6-8 singers, sometimes expanding to larger vocal and instrumental forces. The ensemble has formed close relationships with the music of Heinrich Schütz, Jan Pieterszoon Sweelinck and Johann Sebastian Bach, and focus on one-to-a-part performances. Their programmes usually blend sacred and secular music, and are in a style which often joins the chosen pieces into a semi-theatrical sequence on a particular theme or season.

They perform at early music festivals throughout the UK and Europe (e.g. Utrecht, Spitalfields, Flanders, Seville) and occasionally experiment with contemporary music (premiere of Umbra Sumus by the British composer Terry Mann).

CD-recordings include Rites of Spring, a musical contemplation on the season of Spring with music by Schütz, Claude Le Jeune, Sweelinck, Johann Hermann Schein; and a solo-voice recording of Bach's motets

== Press quotes ==
- "This disc has unparalleled immediacy and drama" (The Independent, March 2008 on J S Bach Motets "Meines Herzens Weide")
- "Skilful blending of sacred and secular…uninterrupted enjoyment..." (Classic FM Magazine, June 2000 on Rites of Spring)
- "Immaculate clarity... the effect is magical..." (Early Music News, June 2000)
- "Thoughtfully compiled and superbly executed..." (The Times, May 2000)
