= Charles Humphries =

English singer

Charles Humphries is an English countertenor, noted for performances of Baroque and Renaissance music. He is the director of Baroque music at the SIMF. He has performed at the Barbican Hall, Queen Elizabeth Hall, Wigmore Hall, Concertgebouw in Amsterdam and Palais des Beaux Arts in Brussels and across Europe.
