= Miriam Allan =

Australian soprano (born 1977)

Miriam Allan (born 1977, in Newcastle, Australia) is an Australian soprano.

== Education ==
Miriam Allan graduated with a Bachelor of Music degree from the University of Newcastle, Australia, with first class honours and the University Medal. She received an Australian Postgraduate Award from the Australian Federal Government, and completed a Master of Creative Arts (Music).

== Career ==
Miriam Allan has appeared as a soloist with leading orchestras and choirs from all over the world. She has performed with Monteverdi Choir and English Baroque Soloists, London Baroque, London Handel Orchestra (UK), Les Arts Florissants (France), Auckland Philharmonia Orchestra (New Zealand), Concerto Copenhagen (Denmark), Il Fondamento (Belgium), Gewandhaus Kammerchor, Leipzig Chamber Orchestra, Concerto Köln, ChorWerk Ruhr (Germany), Sydney Philharmonia Choirs, Australian Chamber Orchestra, Chacona and Arcadia, Ironwood Ensemble, Queensland Orchestra and Melbourne Symphony Orchestra (Australia).

She has worked with many directors and conductors, including Sir John Eliot Gardiner, Lars Ulrik Mortensen, Laurence Cummings, William Christie, Roy Goodman and Stephen Layton. She appeared on numerous recordings, including Pinchgut Opera's Fairy Queen and Dardanus, The Wonders of the World with Echo du Danube, Mozart's Requiem with the Leipzig Kammerorchester and Gewandhaus Kammerchor.

She performed in performances of Purcell's The Fairy Queen with Glyndebourne Festival Opera, Israel in Egypt with Maulbronn Kammerchor and Monteverdi's 6th Book of Madrigals with Les Arts Florissants, and in the Australian premiere of Bach's reconstructed Markuspassion in the Sydney Opera House under Arvo Volmer.

During her European and Australian tours she often performs major works by Bach, a unique selection of Purcell's songs from his semi-operas The Fairy Queen, The Indian Queen and King Arthur, Handel's Messiah and Mozart's Requiem.

In 2003 Miriam Allan was a prize-winner in the Handel Singing Competition for young professional singers organized annually by the London Handel Society. She is a vocal coach at Westminster Under School and Head of Singing at Bloxham School in Oxfordshire.

Since 2003 Miriam Allan has been based in England. She is married to Richard Bannan, a lay clerk of St George’s Chapel Windsor.

On 17 April 2021, Allan was one of a choir of four singers (three of whom were Lay Clerks of St George's Chapel Choir) during the funeral service of Prince Philip, Duke of Edinburgh, at St George's Chapel, Windsor Castle.

== Recordings ==
- Monteverdi: L'Orfeo. Les Arts Florissants, Paul Agnew (2017)
