= Hannoversche Hofkapelle =

Musical orchestra in Hanover, Germany

- Chamber orchestra on period instruments
- Founded: 1995
- Location: Hanover
- Website: www.hannoversche-hofkapelle.de

Hannoversche Hofkapelle (unofficial English translation: The Hanoverian Court Orchestra), located in Hanover (Germany), remains faithful to the tradition of historic court orchestras and performs both chamber music and symphonies. The sound of this ensemble is hallmarked by the fact that the musicians also have experience of playing with different music ensembles on the European Baroque scene and view historical performance practices as a means of keeping current.

The repertoire of the Orchestra is not restricted to the many forms of Baroque music alone, but also includes classical works, with Mozart operas and the Romantic era being particularly favoured. Their constant involvement with 17th and 18th-century music has made the Court Orchestra musicians masters of their respective instruments. The result is the expressive and elegant style of playing that assures the orchestra its prominent position. The Hanoverian Court Orchestra has been the "orchestra in residence" at the Herrenhausen Festival Weeks since 2006.

== Players ==
Concertmistress: Anne Röhrig, Violins: Christoph Heidemann, Marlene Goede-Uter, Katharina Huche-Kohn, Eva Politt, Susanne Dietz, Barbara Kralle, Stephanie Bücker, Susanne Busch, Birgit Fischer, Violas: Bettina Ihrig, Hella Hartmann, Klaus Bona, Klaus Bundies, Cellos: Dorothee Palm, Daniela Wartenberg, Bass Viol: Cordula Cordes, Continuo: Bernward Lohr, Oboes: Annette Berryman, Kristin Linde, Flutes: Laurie Dean, Christina Ahrens, Bassoon: Alexander Golde, Trumpets: Friedemann Immer, Christoph Draeger, Timpani: Frithjof Koch, Orchestra Management: Dorothee Palm

== Releases ==
CDs with the Hanoverian Court Orchestra are released for example by Hänssler and K&K Verlagsanstalt: List of releases at the Orchestra's website
