= Stephen Varcoe =

English singer (born 1949)

- Born: Christopher Stephen Varcoe; 19 May 1949 (age 76); Lostwithiel, Cornwall
- Education: King's College, Cambridge; University of York
- Occupation: Classical bass-baritone
- Organization: Betty Roe Society

Christopher Stephen Varcoe (born 19 May 1949 in Lostwithiel, Cornwall) is an English classical bass-baritone singer, appearing internationally in opera and concert, known for Baroque and contemporary music and a notable singer of Lieder.

== Professional career ==
Stephen Varcoe was educated at The King's School, Canterbury and King's College, Cambridge, where he sang in the choir. He later completed a PhD at the University of York. In 1977 he won a scholarship from the Gulbenkian Foundation.

On the opera stage he appeared in Haydn's L'infedeltà delusa in Antwerp, in Debussy's Fall of the House of Usher in Lisbon and London, in John Tavener's opera Mary Of Egypt for the Aldeburgh Festival, and he performed the part of Plutone in Peri's Euridice at the Drottningholm Festival in Sweden. He also performed the parts of Death in Gustav Holst's chamber opera Savitri, Demetrius in Britten's A Midsummer Night's Dream and Salieri in Nikolai Rimsky-Korsakov's Mozart & Salieri.

He performed Alexander Goehr's Sonata About Jerusalem with Oliver Knussen and the Schoenberg Ensemble, Bach's St Matthew Passion with Trevor Pinnock, Ralph Vaughan Williams' Sir John In Love with Richard Hickox and the Northern Sinfonia, and Schubert's Mass in E flat major with Roger Norrington and the Vienna Symphony Orchestra.

In the field of historically informed performance, Varcoe recorded in 1984 with Hans-Martin Linde Bach's Missa in A major and the Missa in G major. He recorded several Bach cantatas with John Eliot Gardiner, the Monteverdi Choir and the English Baroque Soloists, including an early 1990 recording of Wachet auf, ruft uns die Stimme, BWV 140, together with Ruth Holton and Anthony Rolfe-Johnson. He also recorded with the group Bach's St John Passion and St Matthew Passion and participated in the group's Bach Cantata Pilgrimage in 2000. He recorded Bach's Magnificat and Mass in B minor with Hickox and the Collegium Musicum 90.

His recording of songs of Charles Villiers Stanford with pianist Clifford Benson was acclaimed in the International Record Review in 2000:

He sounds as if he has been singing Stanford all his life, and his warm, natural baritone, finely judged legato and sensitivity to words are a joy throughout.

Varcoe wrote a book on the art of singing English song: Sing English Song: a practical approach to the language and the repertoire.

He was appointed the President of the Betty Roe Society in 2010.
