= Giulia Frasi =

18th-century Italian soprano

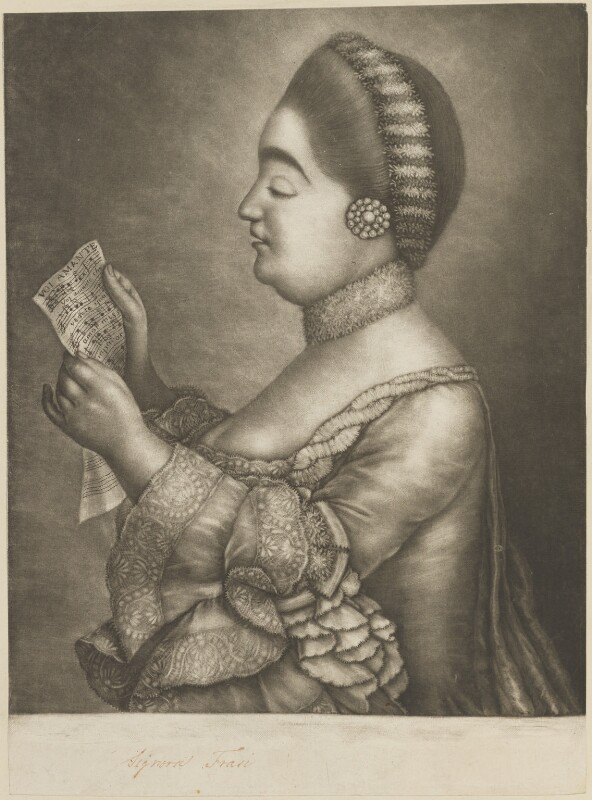
Giulia Frasi (source unknown)

Giulia Frasi (also Frassi) was born c. 1730 and died in 1772 or after May 1774. She was an Italian soprano who was primarily active in London. She sang in every one of Handel's English oratorios (with the exception of Semele), including various world premières for which the composer wrote roles specifically for her.

== Early life and career ==
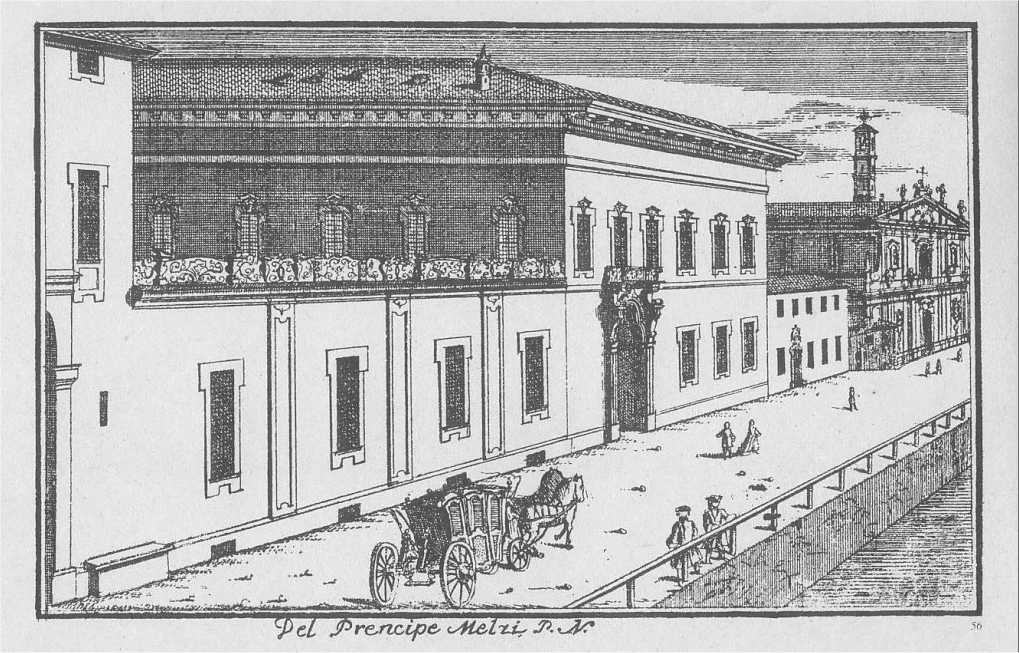
Milan in the 18th century, Palazzo Mannati

=== Italy ===
There is very little biographical information about Giulia Frasi. She was born in or around Milan before 1730. She had a younger brother named Giovanni who, like her, settled in England and died there in 1795 at 65, after having worked extensively as a tailor-embroiderer for the then Prince of Wales, George IV.

In her native Italy Frasi studied singing with Milanese composer Brivio. She also performed there for a few years during the early 1740s making her operatic debut at Lodi (1740) and then singing in Alessandria (1740), Bergamo (1741), and Modena (1742).

=== London ===
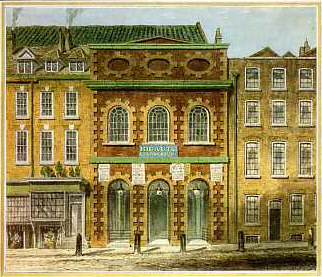
The King's Theatre in Haymarket in the 18th-century

She moved to London in autumn 1742 – perhaps following Giuseppe Ferdinando Brivio – with her friend and fellow singer the contralto Caterina Galli. In England she joined Lord Middlesex's Italian opera company. Lord Middlesex was director of Italian opera at the Haymarket Theatre whose purpose was to challenge Handel's solid hold on London opera goers. She studied under the English educator, musician and historian Charles Burney.

Her English career began shortly after her arrival, first performing in comprimario roles at the King's Theatre. Her profile rising gradually within the company, she soon appears in secondary roles, including breeches roles (for example: Taxiles (1743) and Cleon (1747–8), both in Rossane, and the giant Briareus in the première of Gluck's La caduta de' giganti in 1746).

Her actual London début took place on 2 November 1742 at the King's Theatre as Mahobeth in the pasticcio Gianguir with music by Lampugnani, Hasse and Brivio. The latter's music will also be used in two other pasticcios produced at the King's Theatre during the 1740s: Mandane, premièred on 12 December 1742 (and later, L'incostanza delusa, premièred on 9 February 1745).

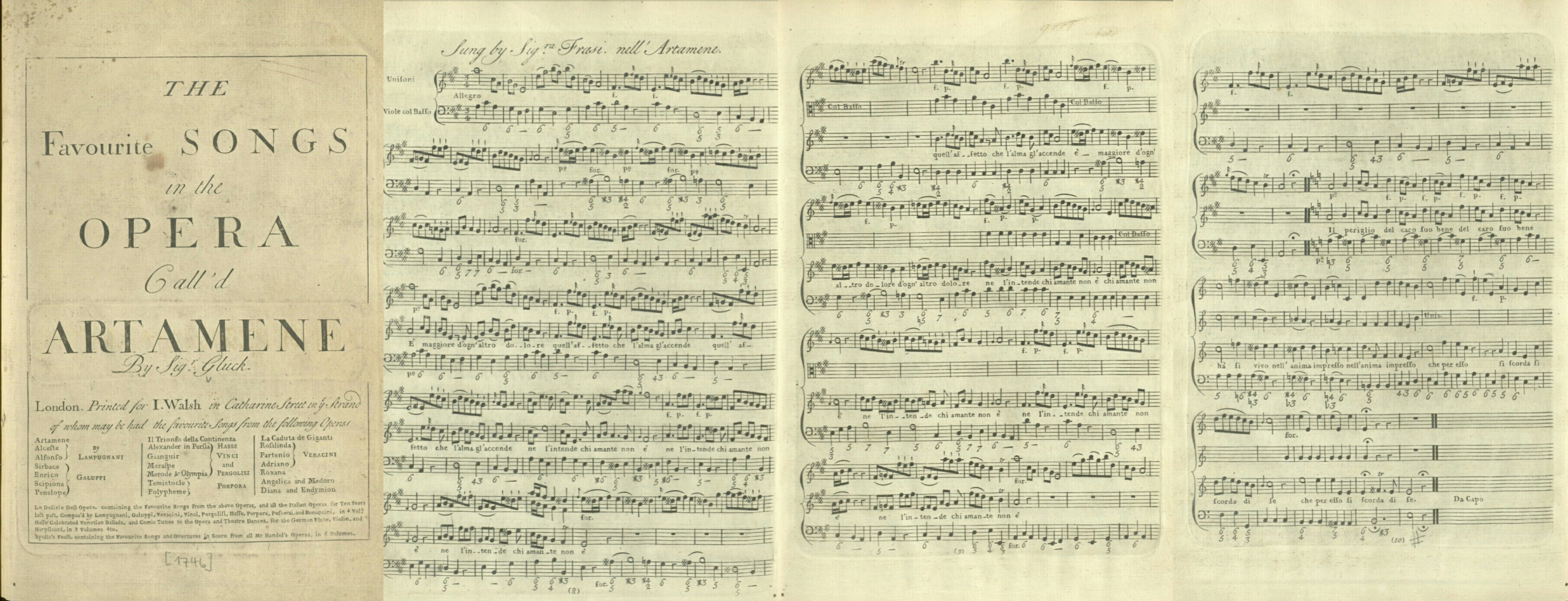
Aria sung by Frasi in Gluck's Artamene, published in The favourite songs in the opera call'd Artemene by Sigr. Gluck in 1746

This was followed straight away by a period of intense artistic activity on the London stage, still at the King's Theatre, singing works by Lampugnani, Hasse, Porpora, Galuppi.

However, just a couple of years after her arrival in the British capital, shortly after the première of the pasticcio L'incostanza delusa, all theatres in London were closed because of the political turmoil caused by the Stuart rising. Charles Burney thus recalls the events:

The great Opera-house being shut up this year [1745] on account of the rebellion, and popular prejudice against the performers, who being foreigners, were chiefly Roman Catholics; an opera was attempted April 7th, at the little theatre in the Hay-market, under the direction of Geminiani. ... The opera was a pasticcio, and called L'incostanza delusa. But Count St. Germain composed several new songs, particularly "Per pietà bell'idol mio", which was sung by Frasi, first woman, and encored every night. The rest of his airs, and two by Brivio, Frasi's master ..., were only remarkable for their insipidity. ... The success of this enterprize was inconsiderable, and the performances did not continue more than nine or ten nights.

When the political situation improved fully-fledged theatrical activities recommenced with a première of Gluck's opera La caduta de' giganti (The Fall of the Giants) on 17 January 1746. La caduta de' giganti, a command from Lord Middlesex, with a libretto by Vanneschi, glorified the hero of the battle of Culloden, the Duke of Cumberland. Frasi, who had created the role of the giant Briareo for Gluck, was back on stage and continued her intense musical activity: first with a role in Gluck's second London opera (Artamene) and then with works by Capranica, Caldara, Veracini, Terradellas, Paradisi and others.

In addition, her association with the annual charity concerts in aid of the Fund for Decay'd – known today as the Royal Society of Musicians – started as early as 1743. The earliest documented occasion (a fundraiser event) on which she performed English-language airs, including some by Handel, in public was as early as March 1746. Her charity fundraising also included benefactors such as the Foundling Hospital, where Handel held regular benefit concerts and annual performances of Messiah that continued until Handel's death and beyond, the Jermyn Lying-in Hospital, in aid of which she sang in a performance of Arne's revised version of Alfred organised at the King's Theatre on 12 May 1753, and many others.

=== Noticed by Handel ===
A few years after her London début she is noticed by Handel, who, appreciating her singing, her determination to sing articulately in English and, above all, her musical expressiveness, hires her for his 1749 season. That same year she becomes his principal soprano and sings the title role in Susanna (her first Handel oratorio). Handel takes her under his wing and she quickly becomes one of his favourites. "The subtle artistry and emotional depth of Handel's [powerful] writing for Frasi" is a testament to how expressive her singing must have been and to how much Handel must have estimated this particular talent of hers.

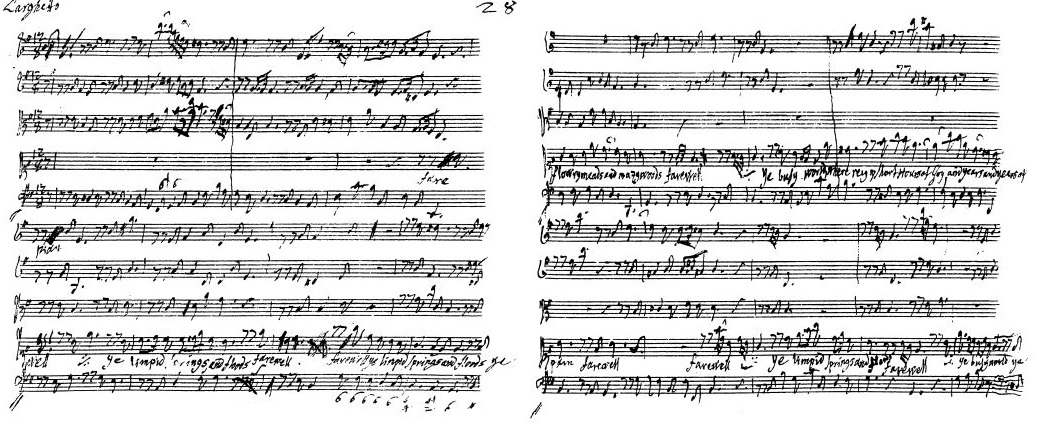
"Farewell, ye limpid springs" (from Jephtha). To show off Frasi's expressiveness, in this aria, Handel uses rests between phrases (sighs), compound time and simple lines (tender tunes), broken lines and minor key (plaint and sorrows), echos etc. ("It was ...[a] scene tailor-made for Frasi, who would sing it at her last appearance in aid of the Fund for Decay'd Musicians or Their Families [in 1761].")

For example, in Theodora (premièred in 1750 with Frasi being once again the principal soprano in a title role written specifically for her by Handel), act 2, scene 2 opens with "a plaintive symphony for flutes and strings establish[ing] the lonely despair of the character, and [then] her dread for the violation of her chastity is sublimely expressed in 'With Darkness deep as is my Woe' – in the extraordinary key of F-sharp minor; [...with] pathos-generating rolling strings and almost unbearable uses of silence between phrases. After an interlude of 'soft Musick' the desperate woman prays effusively for divine deliverance in 'O that I on Wings cou'd rise'."

=== 1749, a busy year ===
Some of Frasi's engagements during the year 1749:

- Twice weekly: noon concerts at Ranelagh with the tenor John Beard.
- revival of Handel's Messiah.
- revival of Handel's Hercules.
- 10 February: production of Handel's Susanna (including première and creation of the role of Susanna).
- 17 March: production of Handel's Solomon (including première and creation of the principal soprano roles).
- 21 March: Entertainment of Music at the King's Theatre for the "Benefit and Increase of a Fund for the support of Decayed Musicians or their Families.
- 6 April: puts on her own benefit concert at the New Theatre.
- 10 April: concert for the benefit of the five-year-old singer Cassandra Frederick, with whom Frasi may later have starred in the première of Handel's The Triumph of Time and Truth (1757) and the revivals of Handel's oratorios Belshazzar (1758), Jephtha (1758), Messiah (1758), Judas Maccabaeus (1759), and Thomas Arne's Alfred (1759).
- 13 April: benefit concert for her friend and colleague Caterina Galli.
- 24 April: Mr Tozzi's concert at Hickford's Room.

== Private life ==
=== Addresses in London ===
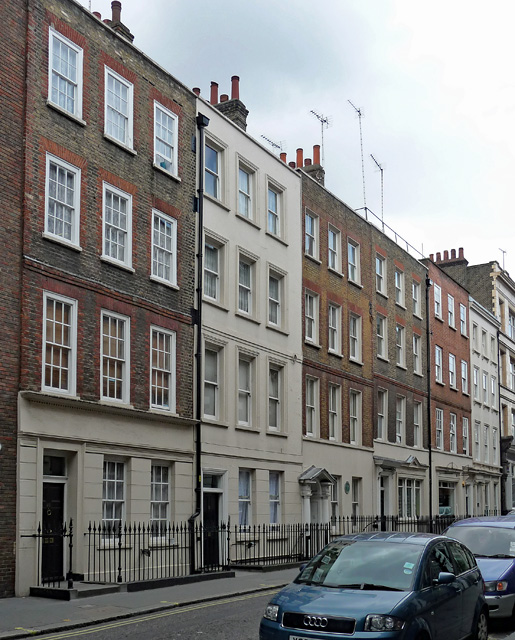
Georgian houses in Great Pulteney St. in today's London

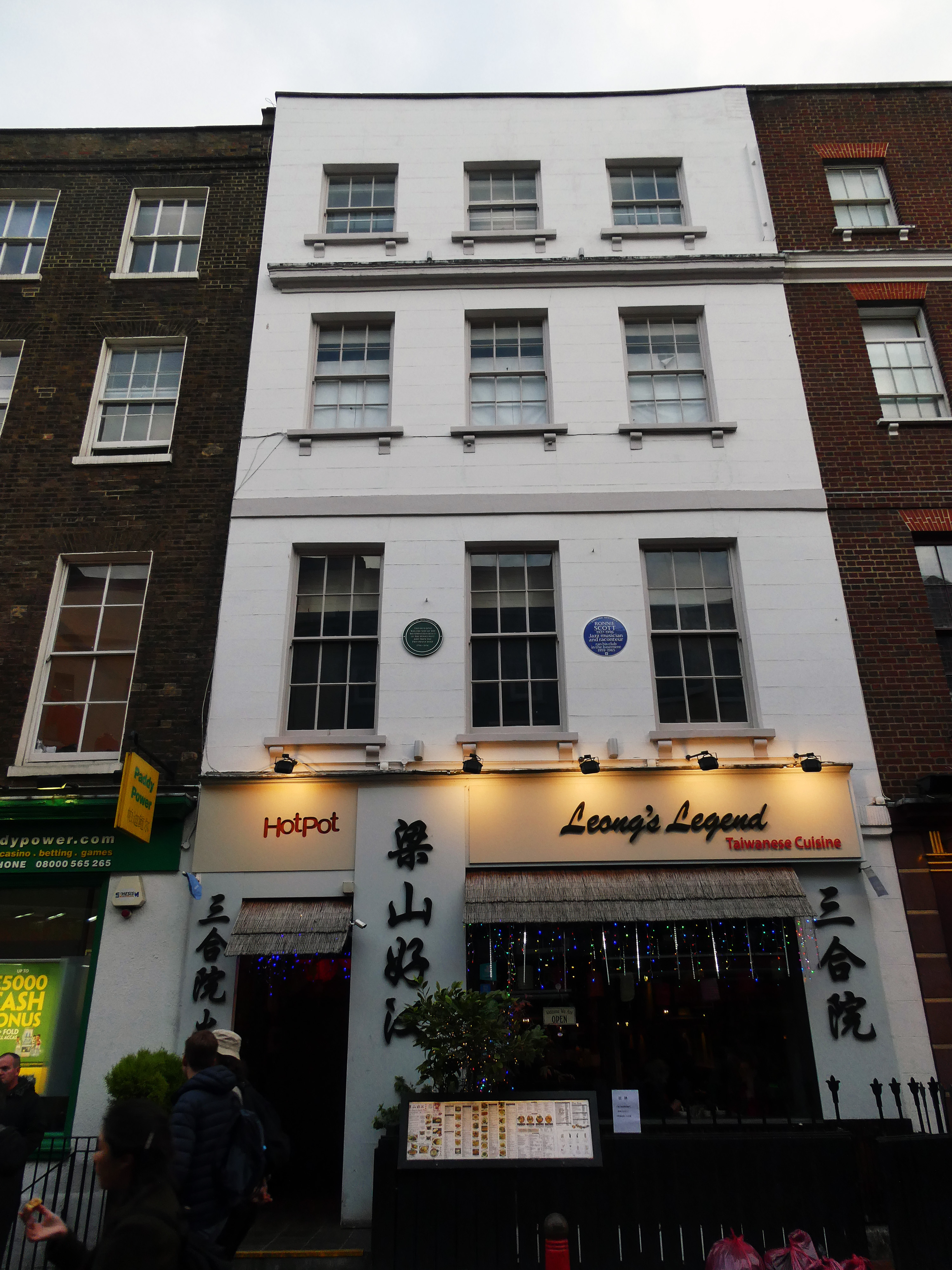
Former Westminster Penny Post offices at 39 Gerrard St.

From 1745 to 1752 Frasi lived in Great Pulteney street, not far from Golden Square. Great Pulteney Street had just been laid out during the area's redevelopment in the early eighteenth century (Many of the houses built at this time still survive today). The street was never fashionable though, nor was it identified with any trade or craft. Yet there was a large brewery and there were famous musical instrument makers as well: notably Kirkman's, which had been established there in 1739 and remained until 1750, and, from 1742 to 1774, the harpsichord-maker Burkat Shudi, founder of the firm now known as Broadwood & Sons. Composer Michael Festing also lived there between 1747 and 1752.

Then she moved to Gerrard Street, which is now part of London's Chinatown. She lived there at Charles Churchill's (Horace Walpole's future brother-in-law) for many years with her daughter (born in 1743). At the time, the City of Westminster had its Penny Post offices at number 39. In 1740, No. 44 had become an apothecary's shop and was occupied until 1765 by the apothecary to George III's household. Many artists lived in Gerrard Street, for instance: the painter Chevalier Andrea Casali, or the architect John Crunden. The tavern at number 9 was the first home of The Club, founded in 1764 by Joshua Reynolds and Dr. Samuel Johnson.

=== Wages ===
She was paid 6 guineas, very high wages at the time, for the charity revivals of Handel's Solomon at the Foundling Hospital in 1754, 1758 and 1759. She was the highest paid singer at Handel's Foundling Hospital performances of Messiah.

== Voice ==
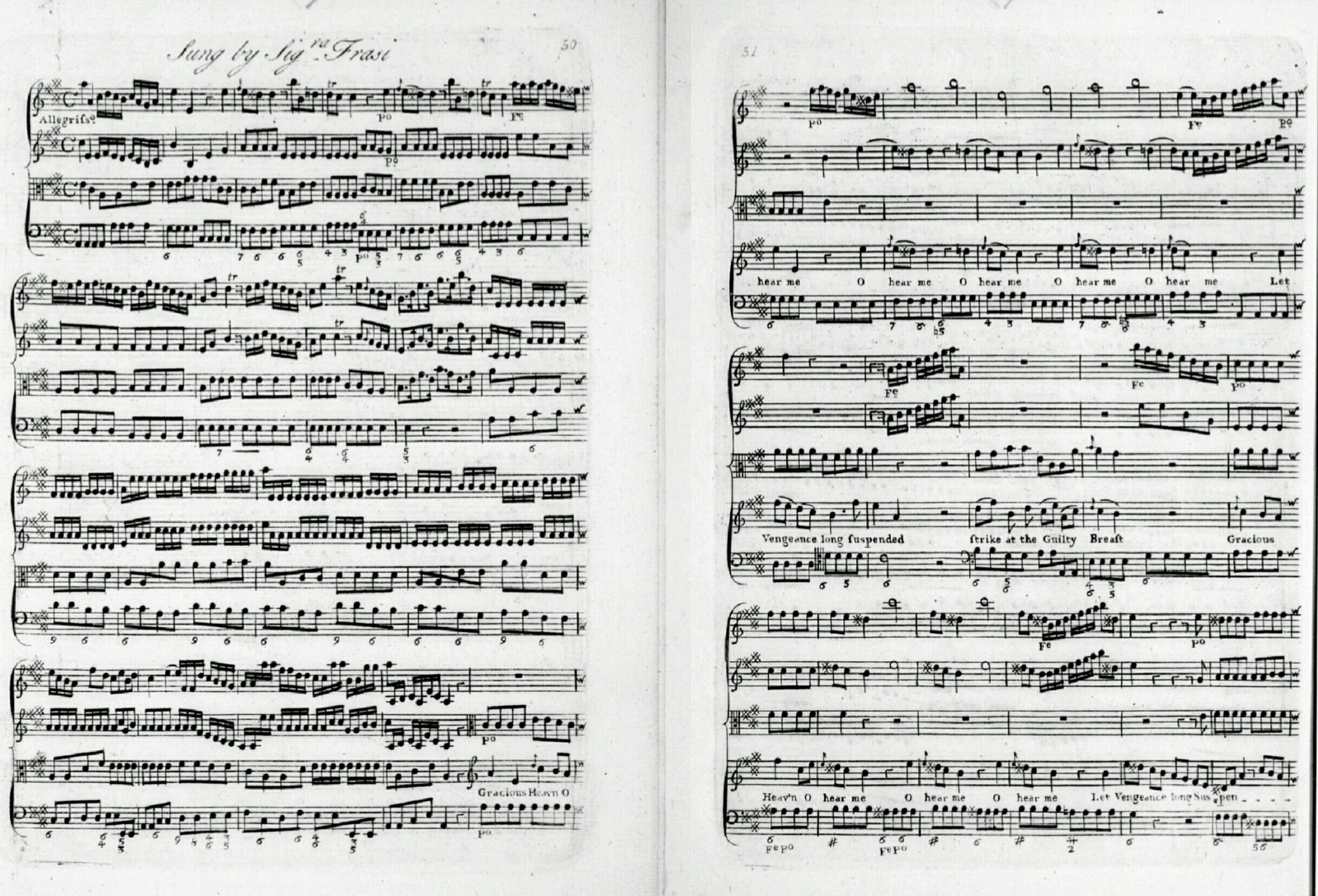
The first two pages of "Gracious Heav'n, O hear me!", aria composed by Thomas Arne for Frasi and added to act 2, scene 2 of The Masque of Alfred for the 1753 revival of the work. The text at the top of the first page reads: "Sung by Signora [Ms] Frasi"

Frasi was endowed with a beautiful and robust soprano voice whose expressive qualities were greatly valued by Handel, much more than her technical ones. Indeed, allegedly, Frasi had a very limited interest in studying and practicing; Burney tells us an anecdote showing the composer's sarcasm about Frasi's motivation regarding training: "When Frasi told him, that she should study hard; and was going to learn Thorough-Base, in order to accompany herself: Handel, who well knew how little this pleasing singer was addicted to application and diligence, says, 'Oh – vaat may we not expect!' " Nonetheless she did study under Handel – along with Caterina Galli – and benefited greatly from his tuition.

In his General History of Music (1789), Charles Burney remembers her at the beginning of her career as "[being...] young, and interesting in person, with a sweet and clear voice, and a smooth and chaste style of singing, which, though, cold and unimpassioned, pleased natural ears, and escaped the censure of critics." At the time the roles she sang were often of cold and unimpassioned characters, Burney, however, does not clarify "whether her 'cold' singing emerged from dramatic concerns, or whether her casting reflected the perception of her performance style"

She had excellent reviews, especially in Salisbury, and was highly appreciated by the British public, whose preference yet was the nightingale singing of castrati rather than a voice whose abilities had nothing exceptional however delicate it was.Although she did reprise some castrati roles in revivals (for example in Artaxerxes) and that arias written specifically for her do occasionally include fiery – if short – coloraturas. "Gracious Heav'n, O hear me!" composed by Arne for Frasi and added to The Masque of Alfred is a "lively da capo aria di bravura." "Là per l'ombrosa sponda!", found in Vincenzo Ciampi's Trionfo di Camilla is another example of virtuoso aria written for Frasi. Both arias are strongly influenced by the Neapolitan school, whose composers Frasi had sung earlier in her career. Burney also recorded that the 1742 London pasticcio, entitled Meraspe o L’Olimpiade, based on Pergolesi’s L'Olimpiade, was so successful that its virtuoso aria "Tremende oscuri atroci", was sung at concerts by Frasi for ten years, at least, after the run of the opera was over. This aria, written for the castrato Angelo Monticelli, is "ferociously difficult ... with virtuosic text-painting in the vocal line, rapid passagework and repeated notes that would have required honed technique and a soprano of light agility".

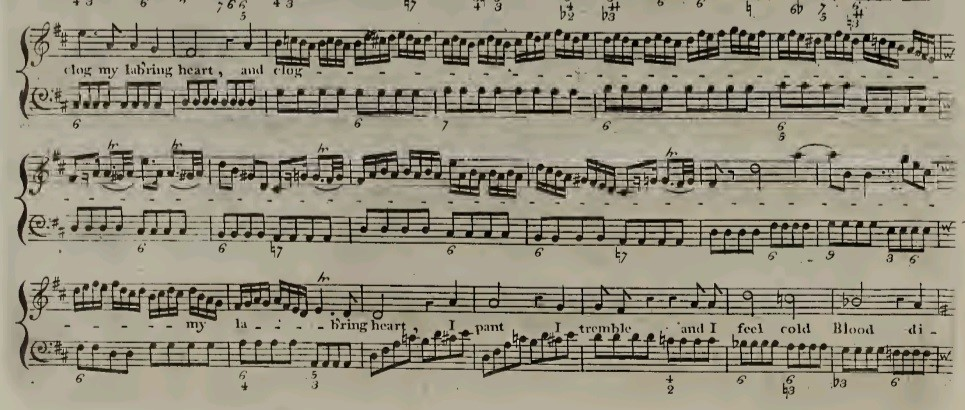
Twelve-bar coloratura from "Amid a thousand racking woes", written for Tenducci, in Arne's Artaxerxes (act 1, scene 2). The passaggi battuti, cantar di sbalzo, mordenti, arpeggi etc. are hallmarks of castrato arias. (In the 1769 revival of Arne's opera, Frasi would have sung this aria.)

However, inspired by her rare and particular talent in musical expressiveness, Handel composed for her music of overwhelming sensitivity and beauty. "Time and time again [you] feel [yourself] drawn to the empathetic temperament and lyrical ease of the vocal writing, embodied in the music Handel wrote for her." Her roles contain vivid scenes of emotional and spiritual drama; they depict suffering and distress along with courage, dignity, and selflessness, a whole palette of subtle and complex human emotions. The wonderful series of oratorio parts Handel composed for her, including the two Queens in Solomon, the title roles in Susanna and Theodora, and Iphis in Jephtha, are an indication of his regard for her expressive powers, though they are not technically arduous; their extreme compass is B3 to A5.

Following in Handel's steps, Smith's Paradise Lost required Frasi to express innocence, culpability, pious sorrow and penitence when Eve faces the consequences of her new and inevitable mortality. The aria "It comes" is a showcase of Smith's and Frasi's abilities in conveying such emotions. Rebecca is another example of Smith showcasing Frasi's talent at expressing human feelings in music.

On a different note, Burney highlights that "having come to this country at an early period of her life, she pronounced our language in singing in a more articulate and intelligible manner than the natives".

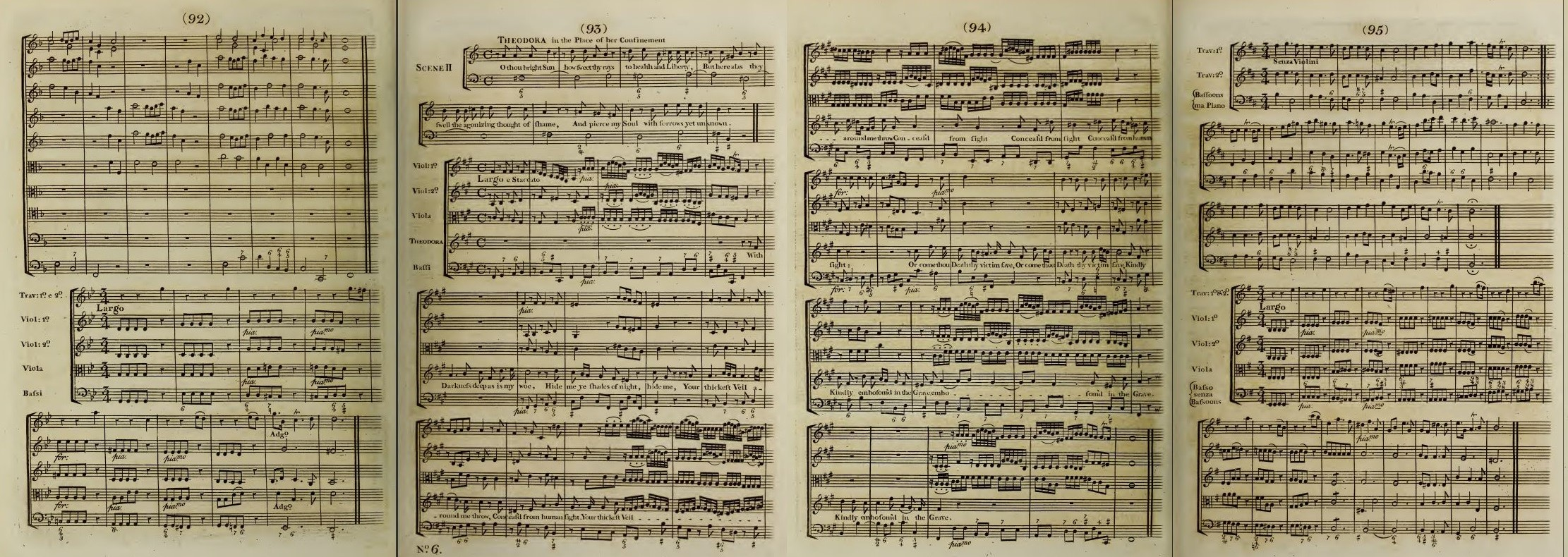
First part of the emotional act 2I, scene 2 from Theodora, written by Handel for Frasi

== Repertoire and career ==
Note that the table below is not exhaustive. Note also that the works/events listed in bold are documented; the ones not in bold are plausible suppositions.

Year	Work	Role	Composer(s)	Premiere	Additional notes
1740	**La Costanza in trionfo**		Brivio		Lodi, Italy
1740	**Il Bajazet**		Giovanni Colombri		Alessandria, Italy
1742	**Tito vespasiano o La clemenza di Tito**		Hasse	revival	Modena, Italy
1742	**Gianguir**	Mahobeth	Lampugnani; Brivio; Capua; Hasse	première	pasticcio at the King's Theatre.: Gianguir: Amorevoli; Cosrovius: Angelo Monticelli; Semira: Caterina Visconti; Zama: Sga Giovanna Contini; Mahobeth: Sga Giulia Frasi
1742	**Mandane**	Emira	Brivio; Gluck	première	pasticcio based on Gluck's Artaserse, at the King's Theatre.: Dorimaspes: Amorevoli; Mandana: Siga Visconti; Emira: Siga Frasi; Almerind: Monticelli; Idrenus: Siga Galli; Floridan: Siga Contini
1742	**Enrico**	Costanza	Galuppi	première	at the King's Theatre.
1743	**Temistocle**	Roxana	Porpora	première	at the King's Theatre.: Themistocles: Amorevoli; Aspasia: Siga Visconti; Roxana: Siga Frasi; Xerxes: Monticelli; Lisimachus: Siga Galli; Sebastes: Siga Contini
1743	**Sirbace**	Nirena	Galuppi	première	at the King's Theatre.: Rosbales: Amorevoli; Eurene: Siga Visconti; Nerena: Siga Frasi; Sirbace: Monticelli; Astarbus: Siga Galli; Lesbano: Siga Contini
1743	**Roxana; or, Alexander in India (Rossane o Alessandro Nell'Indie)**	Tassile	Lampugnani	première	pasticcio at the King's Theatre. In 1743 Lampugnani took the place of Galuppi as musical director of the King's Theatre. On 15 November of the same year he produced, Rossane, his first composition, at the house for which he was the new resident composer, possibly a rearrangement of Handel's Alessandro.
1744	**Alphonso**	Garzia	Lampugnani	première	at the King's Theatre, January.: Alfonso: Monticelli; Elvira: Rosa Mancini; Pelagio: Fratesanti; Garzia: Siga Frasi; Ermesenda: Siga Visconti; Fernando: Sga Caselli
1744	**Rosalinda**	Ernesto	Veracini	première	at the King's Theatre. Adapted from As You Like It, by P. A. Rolli.: Rosalinda: Siga Visconti; Clelia: Siga Mancini; Constante: Monticelli; Ernesto: Siga Frasi; Montano: Siga Caselli; Selvaggio: Fratesanti
1744	**Aristodemo, tiranno di Cuma**	Timotele	Pescetti	première	pasticcio at the King's Theatre, April.: Senocrita: Sga Visconti; Cleonice: Rosa Mancini; Timotele: Sga Frasi; Eurito: Sga Caselli; Ippomedonte: Fratesanti
1744	**Music for the "Benefit and Increase of a Fund for the support of Decayed Musicians or their Families."**				at the King's Theatre. 10 April. Frasi sings two arias: "Per Pietà" (from Brevio's L'incostanza Delusa); "Scherza Quest' Alma Mia" (from Lampugnani's Bajazet)
1744	**Alceste**	Olinto	Lampugnani	première	at the King's Theatre. Based on Metastasio's Demetrio.: Rosmira: Siga Visconti; Alceste: Monticelli; Barsene: Siga Mancini; Olinto: Siga Frasi; Mitrane: Siga Caselli; Fenicio: Fratesanti
1745	**L'incostanza delusa**	Corina	Brivio Saint-Germain	première	pasticcio. According to David Hunter, the count contributed some of the songs to L'incostanza delusa, an opera performed at the Haymarket Theatre on all but one of the Saturdays from 9 February to 20 April 1745.
1746	**Alessandro nell'Indie**	Timagene	Lampugnani	revival	at the King's Theatre.
1746	**Il Trionfo Della Continenza****/ Il Trionfo Della Costazza**	Quintus Flaminius	Galuppi	première	New opera at the King's Theatre, January.: Lucius: Monticelli; Anagilda: Sga Imer; Eriphilis: Sga Pompeati; Indibilis: Jozzi; Quintus Flaminius: Sga Frasi; Scipior: Ciacchi
1746	**La caduta de' giganti**	Briareo	Gluck	première	Lampugnani had to return to Italy, and he was replaced by Christoph Willibald Gluck who accepted the post at the musical director of the King's Theatre upon an invitation from Lord Middlesex.The opera consists largely of music from Gluck's earlier works, lack of time having forced him to this device. The opera did not meet with success.
1746	**"A Concert"**				For the "Benefit [of Herr] Gluck, composer of the operas at the King's Opera House in the Haymarket ... With a Concerto upon a New Instrument of 26 Glasses. ... Song – Signora Frasi."
1746	**Antigono**	Clearchus	Galuppi	première	at the King's Theatre. a pasticcio with some new music by Galuppi: Antigono: Ciacchi; Berenice: Sga Imer; Demetrius: Monticelli; Ismener: Sga Pompeati; Alexander: Jozzi; Clearchus: Sga Frasi
1746	**Artamene**	Tamur	Gluck	première	The opera also consists largely of music from Gluck's earlier works, lack of time having forced him to this device. The opera did not meet with success either.
1746	**Anibale in Capua**			première	
1746	**Mitridate**	Arbate	Terradellas	première	
1747	**Fetonte**	Teone	Paradies	première	
1747	**Bellerofonte**	Assiane	Terradellas	première	
1747	**Rossane o Alessandro Nelle Indie**	Cleon	Handel; Lampugnani	revival	pasticcio
1747	**Lucius Verus (Lucio Vero)**	Lucilla	Handel	première	pasticcio at the King's Theatre. "Lucius VERUS consist[s] of celebrated Airs from Mr Handel's Operas"It was performed by the "Middlesex" opera company (named after Lord Middlesex): Berenice : Sga Casarini; Lucilla : Sga Frasi; Lucius Verus: Sga Pircher; Vologesus : Sga Galli; Flavius : Sga Sibila; Anicetus : Sig Ciacchi
1748	**La ingratitudine punita**	Silvia	Hasse; Paganelli; Pergolesi; Lampugnani	première	pasticcio at the Little Theatre. "... The Music of the ... Pastoral is chiefly extracted from the Works of the most famous Italian Composers. ... with a new Concerto on the Fiolincello.": Nerina: Sga Casarini; Silvia: Sga Frasi; Alcasto: Sga Pircher; Tirsi: Sga Palli; Idreno: Sig Ciacchi
1748	**Didone (abbandonata)**	Selene	Hasse	revival	at the King's Theatre.: Didone: sga Casarini; Enea: sig Reginelli; Selene: sga Frasi; Emirena: sga Pirker; Jarba: sig Ciacchi; Araspe: sga Galli; Osmida: sga Sibilla
1748	**Semiramide riconsciuta**	Tamiri	Hasse	English première	at the King's Theatre.: Scitalce: sig Reginelli; Tamiri: sga Frasi; Berenice: sga Pirker; Ircano: sig Ciacchi; Mirteo: sga Galli; Sibari: sga Sibilla
1748	**Don Calascione (Gismondo)**		Latilla	revival	
1748	**Judas Maccabaeus**	Israelite woman	Handel	revival	David Vickers explains that "when Handel needed to recruit a new principal soprano soloist for his revival of Judas Maccabaeus (4 March 1748), Frasi managed to squeeze in her fully fledged English oratorio debut for him between performances of a revival of Galuppi's Enrico."
1748	**Enrico**	Costanza	Galuppi	revival	at the King's Theatre, March. "New Songs- with alterations of Sga Cassarini, Sga Frasi."
1748	**Entertainment of Music for the "Benefit and Increase of a Fund for the support of Decayed Musicians or their Families."**				at the King's Theatre, 5 April. Frasi sings two Handel arias: "Heart thou Seat of soft Delight" (from Acis and Galatea); "The Prince unable to Conceal his Pain" (from Alexander's Feast)
1749	**Entertainment of Music for the "Benefit and Increase of a Fund for the support of Decayed Musicians or their Families."**				at the King's Theatre, 21 March. Frasi sings three arias: "Scherza il nocchier talora" by Brevi; "Parto non ho costanza per rimirarti" by Galuppi; "O Sleep, why dost thou leave me?" (from Handel's Semele)
1749	**Susanna**	Susanna	Handel	première	at Covent Garden with the contralto Caterina Galli, the bass Henry Theodor Reinhold and the tenor Thomas Lowe.
1749	**Solomon**	Pharoah's Daughter; Nicaule; First Harlot	Handel	première	at Covent Garden with the contralto Caterina Galli, the bass Henry Theodor Reinhold and the tenor Thomas Lowe.
1749	**"A Concert of Music"**				at the Little Theatre, 10 April, for the "Benefit for Miss Frederick"Vocal Parts: Sga Frasi and Sga Galli. Harpsichord: Miss Cassandra Frederick, "a child of five and a half years and a scholar of Mr Paradies."
1749	**Hercules**	Iole	Handel	revival	
1749	**Messiah**	soprano	Handel	revival	at Covent Garden with Caterina Galli
1750	**Messiah**	soprano	Handel	revival	with Caterina Galli and Gaetano Guadagni. (Handel composed new versions of "But who may abide" and "Thou art gone up on high" for Guadagni).
1750	**"Entertainment of Vocal and Instrumental Music for the "Benefit and Increase of a Fund for the support of Decayed Musicians or their Families."**				at the King's Theatre, 10 April. Frasi sings two arias by Ciampi: Infelice van milagno; Oh dio mancar mi sento (from Adriano in Siria); and she closes the concert with a duet from Handel's Saul, with Guadagni: "O fairest of ten thousand fair"
1750	Alceste	Calliope	Handel	n/a	This was rehearsed but eventually abandoned. Handel re-used the music in oratorios. It is plausible that Frasi was part of the cast as, by then, she was already Handel's favourite principal soprano. Moreover, Calliope's ode to sleep ("Gentle Morpheus") shows typical hallmarks of other "Handel/Frasi collaborations".
1750	**Saul**	Michal	Handel	revival	at Covent Garden
1750	**Adriano in Siria**	Emirena	Ciampi	revival but première of the aria "Oh Dio! Mancar mi sento"	at the King's Theatre, with the famous castrato Gaetano Guadagni and the tenor Filippo Laschi. For Frasi Ciampi wrote the emotional aria "Oh Dio! Mancar mi sento" and added it to act 3, scene 7 of the London version. The opera ran for eight performances, concurrently with Handel's Theodora
1750	**Theodora**	Theodora	Handel	première	at Covent Garden premiere, with Gaetano Guadagni.
1750	**Il Trionfo di Camilla**	Camilla	Ciampi	première	at the King's Theatre. The opera was a failure and had only two performances.: Camilla: Sga Frasi; Latino: Sig Laschi; Turno: Sga Giacomazzi; Lavinia: Sga Mellini; Prenesto: Sig Guadagni; Mezio: Sga Moretti
1750	**La Serva Padrona**	Serpina	Pergolesi	revival	
1751	**"A Pasticcio"**		Arne	première	at the Little Theatre, 5 February, for the "Benefit Master Arne". "To be divided into three Interludes. After the first a new Concerto on the Organ composed by Arne performed by Master Arne. The second Interlude to conclude with a new Pastoral Scene, the Words selected from Shakespeare and composed by Mr Arne. After the third Interlude a Serenata set to music by Arne. Vocal Parts: Sga Frasi."
1751	**The Judgement of Paris**	Venus	Arne		at the Little Theatre, 5 February, for the "Benefit Master Arne".: Paris: Master Arne; Mercury: Mr Lowe; Venus: Sga Frasi; Pallas: Sga Galli; Juno: Mrs Arne
1751	**Belshazzar**	Nitocris	Handel	revival	
1751	**Alexander's Feast**		Handel	revival	The choice of Hercules and Alexander's feast were interpreted the same evening (1 March 1751) with great success. The cast included her friend the soprano Caterina Galli, the tenor Thomas Lowe and perhaps Gaetano Guadagni in the part of Pleasure.
1751	**"Entertainment of Vocal and Instrumental Music for the "Benefit and Increase of a Fund for the support of Decayed Musicians or their Families."**				at the King's Theatre, 16 April. Frasi sings: Infelice in van mi lagno (by Ciampi); Se vedi nascere (by Giovanni Chinzer); Return O God of Hosts (from Handel's Samson)
1751	**Messiah**	soprano	Handel	revival	at the Foundling Hospital
1751	**The Choice of Hercules**	Pleasure	Handel	première	The choice of Hercules and Alexander's feast were interpreted the same evening (1 March 1751) with great success. The cast included her friend the soprano Caterina Galli, the tenor Thomas Lowe and perhaps Gaetano Guadagni in the part of Pleasure.
1751	**Esther**	Esther	Handel	revival	
1752	**Concert of Vocal and Instrumental Music for the "Benefit and Increase of a Fund for the support of Decayed Musicians or their Families."**				at the King's Theatre, 29 March. Frasi sings: Caro sposo, amato oggetto (by Alberti); See Hercules how smiles yon myrtle plain (from Handel's The Choice of Hercules); Se perde l'usignolo (from Jommelli's Cajo Mario); and a trio with Beard and Wass: The Flocks shall leave the Mountain (from Handel's Acis and Galatea)
1752	**Joshua**	Achsah	Handel	revival	
1752	**Jephtha**	Iphis	Handel	première	at Covent Garden. with the tenor John Beard. This is Handel's last oratorio
1752	**Messiah**	soprano	Handel	revival	at the Foundling Hospital
1753	**Alfred**	Eltruda	Arne	revival but première of the aria "Gracious Heav'n, O hear me!"	at the New Haymarket Theatre. Alfred was originally a concise masque the score of which Arne expanded for the 1753 charitable concert. Notably, he added the aria "Gracious Heav'n, O hear me!" to act 2, scene 2, a piece composed specifically for Frasi.
1753	**Enrico**	Costanza	Galuppi	revival	
1753	**Messiah**	soprano	Handel	revival	at the Foundling Hospital
1754	**"Entertainment of Vocal and Instrumental Music for the "Benefit and Increase of a Fund for the support of Decayed Musicians or their Families."**				at the King's Theatre, 28 February. Frasi sings: "Non vi piacque ingiusti Dei" (from Mazzoni's Siroe, re di Persia); "Ti parli in seno amore" (from Perez's Farnace)
1754	**Messiah**	soprano	Handel	revival	at the Foundling Hospital. For this performance the transposed Guadagni arias were restored to the soprano voice.
1754	**Alexander Balus**	Cleopatra	Handel	revival	
1754	**Solomon**	Pharoah's Daughter; Nicaule; First Harlot	Handel	revival	at the Foundling Hospital
1754	**Deborah**	Deborah	Handel	revival	
1754	**Admeto, re di Tessaglia**	Antigona	Handel	revival	with La Viscontina and the tenor Ottavio Albuzzi.
1754	**Artaserse**	Semira	Hasse	revival	at the King's Theatre.: Artaserse: sga Passerini; Mandane: sga Visconti; Artabano: sig Albuzzio; Arbace: sig Serafini; Semira: sga Frasi; Megabise: sig Ranieri
1754	**L'allegro, il penseroso ed il moderato**		Handel	revival	on the same day as Ode for St. Cecilia's day (23 May)
1754	**Ode for St. Cecilia's day**		Handel	revival	on the same day as L'allegro, il penseroso ed il moderato (23 May)
1754	**Ipermestra**	Ipermestra	Lampugnani	revival	at the king's theatre, covering for Regina Mingotti and eventually taking over the role.
1755	**L'allegro, il penseroso ed il moderato**		Handel	revival	revival on the same day as Ode for St. Cecilia's day (21 February)
1755	**Ode for St. Cecilia's day**		Handel	revival	revival on the same day as L'allegro, il penseroso ed il moderato (21 February)
1755	**The Fairies**		Smith	première	at the Drury Lane Theatre. Frasi is cast along with castrato Gaetano Guadagni, next to whom she had one of her greatest successes.
1755	**"Entertainment of Vocal and Instrumental Music for the "Benefit and Increase of a Fund for the support of Decayed Musicians or their Families."**				at the King's Theatre, 17 March. Frasi sings: "Tremende oscuri atroci" (from Pergolesi's L'Olimpiade); "Return O God of Hosts" (from Handel's Samson)
1755	**Ricimero, Re di Goti**	Ernelinda	Galuppi	revival	at the King's Theatre, covering for Regina Mingotti and eventually taking over the role.
1755	**Samson**	triple part of Dalila, the Philistine and Israelite woman	Handel	revival	
1755	**Messiah**	soprano	Handel	revival	at the Foundling Hospital. Handel was severely afflicted by the onset of blindness and he turned over the direction of the Messiah hospital performance to his pupil, John Christopher Smith
1755	**Joseph and his Brethren**	Asenath	Handel	revival	
1755	**Andromaca**	Ermione	Jommelli	revival	Commercial failure, only two performances
1755	**Andromaca**	Andromaca	Jommelli	revival	at the king's theatre, covering for Regina Mingotti and eventually taking over the role.
1756	**Athalia**	Josabeth	Handel	revival	
1755	**Demofoonte**	Creusa	Jommelli	revival	at the king's theatre on 9, 13, 16, 20, 27, 30 December and on 3, 10, 13, 17, 20, 24, 27, 31 January and 3 and 7 February.
1755	**L'Olimpiade**	Argene	Galuppi; Pergolesi	première	pasticcio
1756	**Andromaca**	Andromaca	Jommelli	revival	at the King's Theatre in lieu of Ezio by Davide Perez, taking over Regina Mingotti's role due to the latter's indisposition.
1756	**L'Olimpiade**	Argene	Galuppi	revival	with additional arias by Felice Giardini, at the King's Theatre on 17 and 21 February, 6, 9, 13, 20, 23, 27 March and 6 April. Reprised again for benefits on 27, 29 April and 1 May
1754	Ipermestra	Ipermestra	Lampugnani	revival	at the king's theatre on 25, 29 May and 3, 12, 19 June, possibly covering for Regina Mingotti.
1756	**Eliza**		Arne	première	at the Drury Lane Theatre.
1756	**Grand Entertainment of Vocal and Instrumental Musick for the "Benefit and Increase of a Fund for Support of decay'd Musicians, or their Families."**				at the King's Theatre, 5 April.
1756	**Tito Manlio**	Sabina	Abos	English première	at the King's Theatre.: Titus Manlius: Sig Pazzagli; Manlius: Sig Ricciarelli; Servilia: Sga Mingotti; Sabina: Sga Frasi; Lucius: Sga Mattei; Decius: Sga Mondini
1756	**Israel in Egypt**		Handel	revival	
1756	**Messiah**	soprano	Handel	revival	at the Foundling Hospital, direction by John Christopher Smith
1756			Boyce		at Hereford Cathedral for Three Choirs Festival.
1757	**Messiah**	soprano	Handel	revival	at the Foundling Hospital. Handel comes back at the direction.
1757	**The Triumph of Time and Truth**	Beauty	Handel	première	at Covent Garden. "Alter'd from the Italian with several new Additions.": Time: Mr Champness; Counsel (or Truth): Miss Young; Beauty: Sga Frasi; Pleasure: Mr Beard; Deceit: Sga Beralta
1757	**Demetrio, re di Siria**	Barsene	Cocchi	revival	at the King's Theatre on 8, 12, 15, 19, 22, 26 and 29 November; 3, 6, 10, 13, 17, and 23 December. Recitatives in English and arias in Italian.
1758	**Zenobia**	Egle	Cocchi	première	at the King's Theatre on 10, 14, 17, 21 and 28 January; 4, 11 and 18 February. Recitatives in English and arias in Italian.: Zenobia: Signora Colomba Mattei; Radamisto: Signora Angola Calari; Tiridate: Pasquale Portenza; Egle: Signora Giulia Frasi; Zopira: Salvadore Pazzagli; Mitrane: Signora Laura Rosa.
1758	**Solimano**	Emira	Bertoni; Handel; Perez	première	pasticcio, at the King's Theatre.: Solimano: Sig Pazzaglia; Selim: Sig Potenza; Narsea: Sga Mattei; Osmino: Sga Galori; Emira: Sga Frasi; Resteno: Sga Rosa
1758	**Solomon**	Pharoah's Daughter; Nicaule; First Harlot	Handel	revival	at the Foundling Hospital
1758	**Issipile**	Issipile	Cocchi	première	at the King's Theatre. In 1757 Gioacchino Cocchi came to England, and had several works represented there, but he failed to gain public's recognition as an opera composer. He then devoted himself to teaching singing for fifteen years, which allowed him to accumulate considerable wealth. He also published music in London.. He left London in 1773.
1758	**Jephtha**	Iphis	Handel	revival	"With New Additions And Alterations.": Jephtha : Mr Beard; Iphis: Sga Frasi; Hamor : Miss Young; Storage: Miss Frederick; Zebul : Mr Champness
1758	**Belshazzar**	Nitocris	Handel	revival	"With New Additions And Alterations.": Belshazzar: Mr Beard; Nitocris: Sga Frasi; Cyrus: Miss Young; Daniel: Miss Frederick; Gobrias: Mr Champness
1758	**Messiah**	soprano Handel	revival	at the Foundling Hospital	
1758	**Concert for the "Benefit and Increase of a Fund for the support of Decayed Musicians or their Families."**				at the King's Theatre, 6 April. Frasi sings three arias by Handel: "Wise Men's Flattery" (from Belshazzar); "He Shall Feed His Flock" (from Messiah); "Ye Sacred Priests... Farewell ye Limpid Springs" (from Jephtha).
1759	**Messiah**	soprano	Handel	revival	at the Foundling Hospital and at Covent Garden (the final performance of the work at which Handel was present: 6 April 1759, eight days before his death).
1759	**Judas Maccabaeus**	Israelite woman	Handel	revival	
1759	**Alfred the Great**	Eltruda	Arne	revival	at Covent Garden, "With several new Songs composed by Mr Arne"
1759	**Solomon**	Pharoah's Daughter; Nicaule; First Harlot	Handel	revival	at the Foundling Hospital
1760	**Paradise lost**	Eve	Smith	première	role creation shared with Charlotte Brent
1761	**Concert for the "Benefit and Increase of a Fund for the support of Decayed Musicians or their Families."**				at the King's Theatre, 12 March. Frasi sings two arias from Handel's Jephtha: "Freely I to Heaven Resign"; "Ye Sacred Priests... Farewell ye Limpid Springs"
1761	**Rebecca**	Rebecca	Smith	première	
1763	**Telemachus**	Parthenope	Hayes	première	in Oxford. A projected London performance of Telemachus was advertised in 1764 but seems to have been cancelled.
1767	**Esther**	Esther	Handel	revival	
1767	**Messiah**	soprano	Handel	revival	
1769	**Judas Maccabaeus**	Israelite woman	Handel	revival	
1769	**Artaxerxes**	Arbaces	Arne	revival	organised by herself at the King's Theatre. in aid of the Jermyn Lying-in Hospital. A charity evening dedicated to the composer. The role interpreted by Frasi was originally created in 1762 by the castrato Tenducci, also known as "the second" Senesino. Frasi had seldom performed trouser roles since her formative early years in London.: Artabanes: Vernon; Rimenes: Raworth; Artaxerxes: Mrs Dorman, Mrs; Artabaces: Sga Frasi, Signora, First appearance; Semira: Mrs Scott, Mrs; Mandane: Mrs Barthelemon
1770	**Judas Maccabaeus**	Israelite woman	Handel	revival	at the Little Theatre. "By Permission of the Lord Chamberlain. Benefit for Sga Frasi. Boxes 10s. 6d. Pit 5s. First Gallery 3s. 6d. Second Gallery 2s. To begin at Twelve. Doors open at 11:00 a.m"
April 1774					at the Little Theatre.with the very young Nancy Storace.
May 1774					at Hickford's Room.

== Second part and end of career ==
=== Handel's last prima donna ===
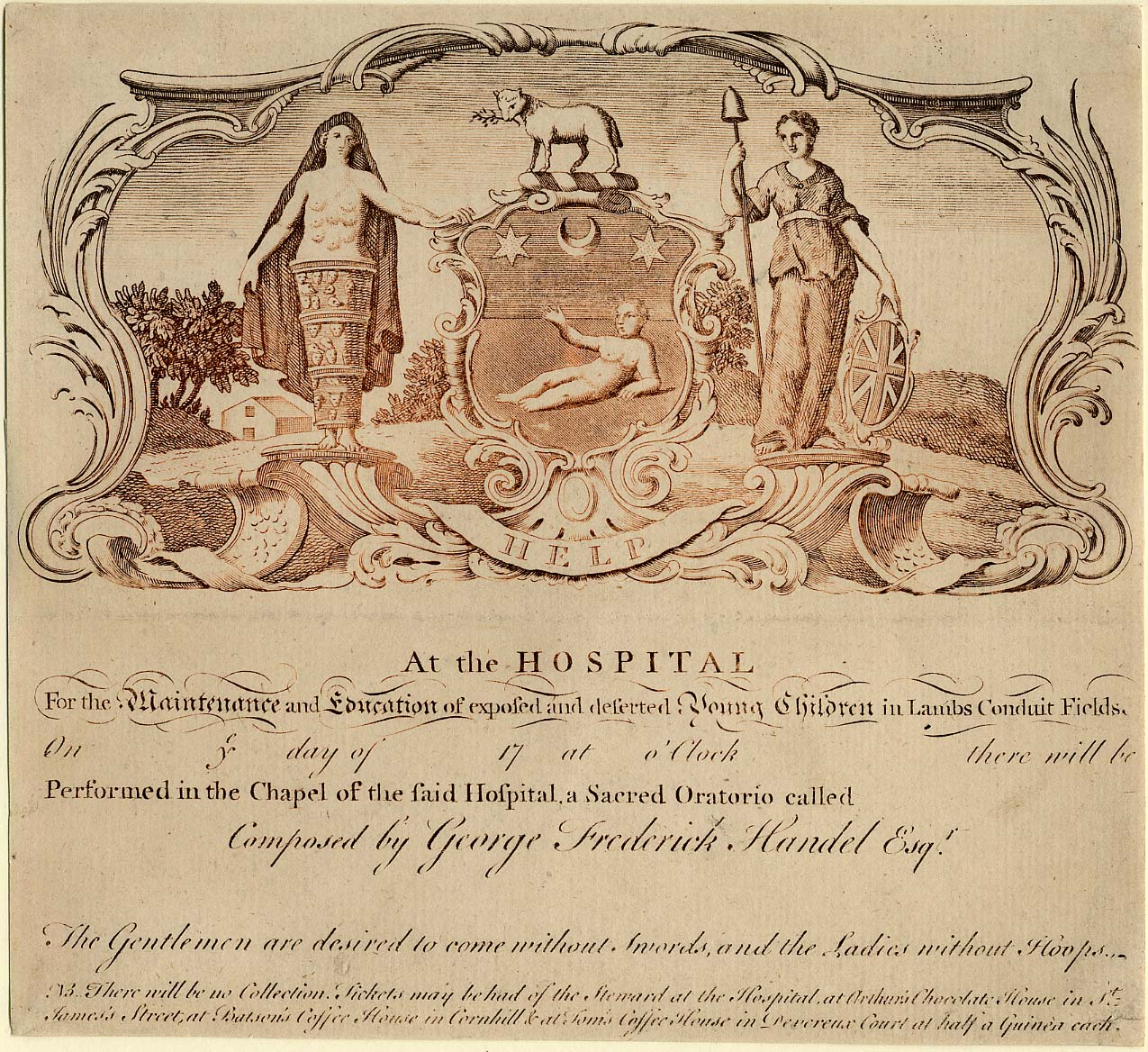
"At the [Foundling] Hospital. For the maintenance and education of exposed and deserted children in Lambs Conduit Fields, on [x] day of [x] 17 [xx] at [x] o'clock there will be, performed in the chapel of the said hospital, a sacred oratorio called [x] composed by George Frederick Handel, Esq. The gentlemen are desired to come without swords and the ladies without hoops. NB; there will be no collection. Tickets may be had of the steward at the Hospital, at Arthur's Chocolate House in St. James's Street, at Batson's Coffee House in Cornhill & at Tom's Coffee House in Devereux Court at half a Guinea each."

As of 1749 Frasi sings in all of the Covent Garden concerts that Handel gave for the rest of his life and she remained Handel's Prima Donna in all his later seasons, creating and interpreting parts he often wrote specifically for her. Her greatest successes were Handel's oratorios.

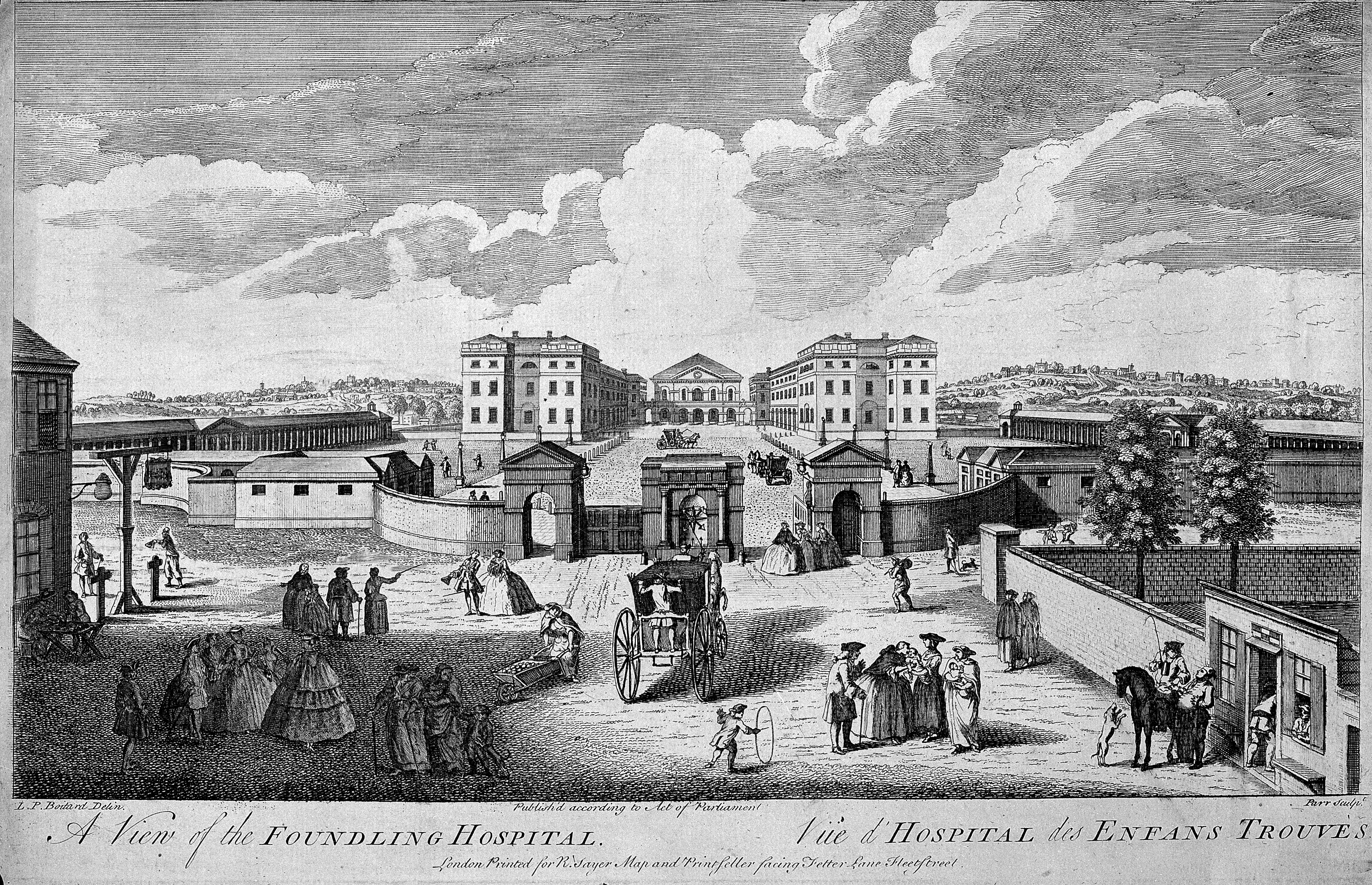
London's Foundling Hospital

From 1750 Messiah had annual performances at the Foundling Hospital until Handel's death and beyond. Based on Frasi's professional relationship with Handel and her involvement in charity, she is likely to have taken part in most of them. Indeed, David Vickers states that "Frasi participated in all of Handel's annual performances of Messiah, in the chapel of the Foundling Hospital (from 1750)."

Many of Handel's oratorios had numerous revivals with her, including in provincial cities: Oxford in 1754, 1756, 1759, Salisbury in 1758, 1761, 1765, Ranelagh in 1751, 1752, and for nine consecutive years at the Three Choirs Festival (1756–64).

For instance:

On 22 June 1754 the Oxford Journal published the following advertising:

On Wednesday the 3rd, Thursday the 4th and Friday the 5th of July, being the three Days following the Commemoration of Founders and Benefactors to the University, L'Allegro, il Penseroso, &c. Judas Macchabæus, and Messiah will be performed in the Theatre. The principal Vocal Parts by Signora Frasi, Mr. Beard, Mr. Wass, and others; and the Instrumental Parts by many of the most excellent Performers of every Kind from London. Further particulars will be specified in the Bills of each Days Performance.

On 30 June 1759 the Oxford Journal published the following advertising:

On Tuesday the 3rd of July (the Day of the Installation) will be performed, in the Theatre, the Oratorio of Samson; on Wednesday the 4th (the Day appointed for commemorating our Founders and Benefactors), the Oratorio of Esther; and on the 5th Messiah, or the Sacred Oratorio; together with select pieces between the Acts (as will be specified in the Bill of each Days Performance) by a numerous and excellent Band from London, Bath and other Places. The principal Vocal Parts by Signora Frasi, Miss Brent, Mess. Beard, Champnes, Wass and Hudson from London and Master Norris from Salisbury. Tickets are to be had at Mr. Cross's Music Shop and at the Coffee Houses; Price Five Shillings.

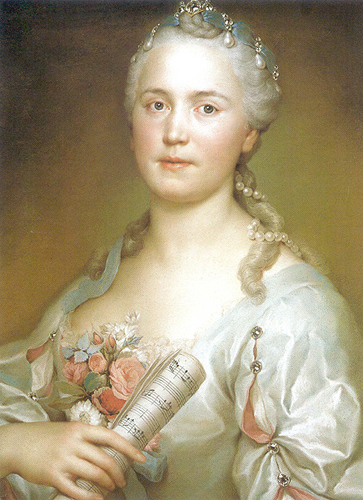
Regina Mingotti, 1745

Throughout the 1750s, "Frasi's concert repertoire stretched from Purcell to Terradellas." She was considered a paramount principal soprano in English oratorios or other works of the sort by Handel and by other composers. Frasi was at nine consecutive meetings of the Three Choirs Festival: she sang for William Boyce at Hereford in 1756, then she performed for Arne, and so on. She gave regular concerts in Oxford too. She also continued to be part of the Covent Garden oratorio concerts given by Handel and, later, by John Christopher Smith and John Stanley. (The latter two would produce their own oratorios (or other works suitable for the occasion) whilst also putting together revivals of Handel's.) In fact, after Handel's death in 1759, Frasi continued as Prima Donna under his successors until about 1768.

In total Frasi also participated in at least fourteen opera seasons at the King's Theatre between 1742 and 1761. In addition to which, during the 1754–1756 seasons, she regularly covered for Regina Mingotti. (Mingotti's fits of temper, antagonisms with the director of the opera company of the King's Theatre and ailings often made her "indisposed". Frasi covered for her many a time, more often than not ending up taking over Mingotti's role for the rest of the performances as Regina Mingotti "[would] not yet [have] recovered of her indisposition". Michael Burden quotes the following newspaper clip:

Signora Mingotti having acquainted Sig Vanneschi Yesterday Afternoon that she continues very much indisposed, and is not able to sing To morrow night, by which Reason the Opera called Ezio cannot be performed; instead thereof Sig. Vanneschi begs Leave to perform the Opera of Andromaca, in which Signora Frasi will do the part of Signora Mingotti; and Signora Peralta is to do the part of Signora Frasi.

During the 1760s, Frasi continued to play a prominent part in the musical life of London. She seems to have transitioned smoothly to the new music style of the generation of composers younger than her; composers like Philip Hayes, who announce the advent of the Classical Era.

She was part of the London Stage for about 31 years in total. Aside from interpreting Handel's and other composers' music on stage, Frasi also continued to sing regularly in charity concerts; she also took part regularly in the annual Musicians Fund (and other) benefits, and sang at the Castle and Swan concerts, at Ranelagh and elsewhere.

=== Progressive retirement ===
From 1764 onwards her public appearances became less frequent. In 1767 she appeared at London's Covent Garden in Esther and at Haberdashers' Hall in Messiah.

She made her last appearances in 1769 in Handel's Judas Maccabaeus at the King's Theatre, and as Arbaces in Artaxerxes by Thomas Arne. The latter is her last known appearance on the stage in an opera.

Finally, in 1770 – after having been "confined for some Time by a bad State of Health" – she appeared again at the Little Theatre on 4 May for a charity concert to her own benefit singing Judas Maccabaeus. For this concert she gathers musical London luminaries such as Giardini, playing first violin and solos, her singer colleague Gaetano Guadagni, and cellist Jean-Pierre Duport. However, the organisation of the concert was plagued with difficulties which eventually lead her to give a "full-scale oratorio ... at the unsociable hour of noon."

Three years later she appeared in a few concerts, making a new "come-back" about which The Morning Post and Daily Advertiser wrote sarcastically: "Signora Frazi, who may be said, with respect to the musical world, to have been long since dead and buried, is expected to rise again in Lent[.]" Vickers adds that "the soprano's comeback comprised a few scattered concerts at inauspicious venues".

=== A significant musical figure ===
Frasi was not only able to quickly win over the London opera stage, but she had Handel's assent as well. She also gained the affection and became a favourite of the English public.

The thirty-one-year career that Frasi enjoyed in London was broad and varied. She was Handel's last prima donna, but she also sang Gluck, the Venetian heritage style of Galuppi, the Neapolitans like Porpora, Pergolesi, Lampugnani, Hasse, Cocchi, and English composers, among which Boyce, Smith, Hayes and Arne. Operas and oratorios on the London stage were a rather important part of her career but so was her music making in other occasions. She did have a non-negligeable place in London's community of musicians and participated in the cultural richness and musical diversity of London and Britain during the mid-Georgian era.

Ruby Hughes says of the roles written by Handel for Frasi that they "seem to engender a depth of female characterisation which may well have subverted the norm at a time". The soprano adds that she is "struck by the significance of [Frasi's] considerable achievements."

== Death ==
Frasi's infamous profligacy inevitably caused problems when her vocal powers ran out. Her accumulated debts due to her expensive and extravagant lifestyle reduced her to poverty, so much so that, in her latest years, after her last documented concert at Hickford's Room on 16 May 1774, she allegedly found herself forced to flee to Calais where she died destitute.

== Discography ==
- There are countless commercial recordings of Handel's works, including the ones sung by Frasi.
- Handel's Last Prima Donna: Giulia Frasi In London. Ruby Hughes (soprano); Orchestra of the Age of Enlightenment, Laurence Cummings. (Chaconne Hybrid SACD, Chandos CHSA0403, 2018). This CD is a tribute to Frasi and includes 4 world première recordings of works by Ciampi, Hayes and Smith. There is a historical and musicological essay by David Vickers in the CD booklet.
- Mozart in London. Helen Sherman (soprano); The Mozartists, Ian Page. (Signum Classics, B07BF2482X, 2018). This CD offers a musical landscape of the London of the 1760s. The tracklist encompasses works by J. C. Bach, Abel, Pescetti, Perez, Rush and Bates, many of which are world première recordings. It also includes two arias from Artaxerxes by Thomas Arne and both are arias Frasi would have sung in the 1763 revival: act 1, scene 2: "Amid a thousand racking Woes" and act 1, scene 13: "O too lovely, too unkind".
