= David Thomas (bass) =

English classical singer

- Born: 1943 (age 82–83)
- Education: King's College, Cambridge
- Occupations: Classical bass; Academic teacher
- Organizations: Choir of King's College; Trinity College London

David Thomas (born 1943) is an English classical bass singer, performing mostly in concert. He has performed internationally at notable concert halls and festivals.

== Life ==
Thomas began his musical career as a chorister at St. Paul's Cathedral in London. He attended King's School, Canterbury, and then as a teenager on a choral scholarship at King's College, Cambridge. He focused on Early music, appearing with ensembles such as Consort of Musicke, conducted by Anthony Rooley, and Academy of Ancient Music, conducted by Christopher Hogwood.

As a soloist, he performed Bach's Christmas Oratorio in Leipzig and Berlin, Handel's Messiah in Italy, Handel's Serse at the Göttingen Handel Festival, among others. In the U.S., he performed Messiah in the Hollywood Bowl with the Los Angeles Philharmonic Orchestra, Schubert's Winterreise at Cornell University, and Handel's oratorios Judas Maccabaeus, Susanna and Theodora, conducted by Nicholas McGegan. He sang Messiah at the 1985 Tanglewood Festival, with Hogwood conducting the Boston Symphony Orchestra. In 1993, he appeared as both Raphael and Adam in Haydn's Die Schöpfung in concerts with the BSO conducted by Simon Rattle and alongside soprano Barbara Bonney, at both the Boston Concert Hall and in Tanglewood.

In 1981, Thomas took part in a recording of Purcell's The Fairy-Queen, conducted by John Eliot Gardiner. He recorded the bass solo of Handel's Messiah with Christopher Hogwood conducting, alongside soprano Emma Kirkby and Carolyn Watkinson in 1982. In 1984 Thomas recorded "Sacred Vocal Music of Monteverdi" with Emma Kirkby and tenor Ian Partridge. He recorded the bass arias in Bach's St Matthew Passion with the King's College Choir, conducted by Stephen Cleobury in 1994.

Thomas has been a professor of voice at Trinity College London and is the father of the actress Antonia Thomas.
