= Theodora (Handel) =

1750 oratorio/opera by Handel

George Frideric Handel

Theodora (HWV 68) is a dramatic oratorio in three acts by George Frideric Handel, set to an English libretto by Thomas Morell. The oratorio concerns the Christian virgin martyr Theodora and Didymus, a Roman soldier, who has secretly converted to Christianity, risks his life to help her, and ultimately shares in her martyrdom. It had its first performance at Covent Garden Theatre on 16 March 1750. Not popular with audiences in Handel's day, Theodora is now recognised as a masterpiece. It is usually given in concert, being an oratorio, but is sometimes staged.

== Context, analysis, and performance history ==
Handel wrote Theodora during his last period of composition. He was sixty-four years old when he began working on it in June 1749. He had written the oratorios Solomon and Susanna the previous year. Theodora would be his penultimate oratorio.

Theodora differs from the former two oratorios because it is a tragedy, ending in the death of the heroine and her converted companion. It is also Handel's only dramatic oratorio in English on a Christian subject.

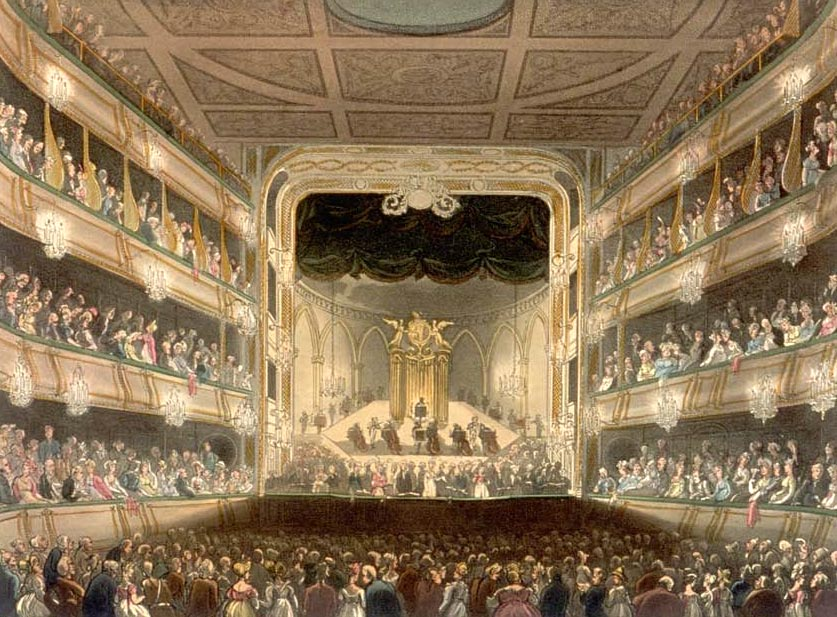
Illustration of the theatre at Covent Garden where Theodora was first performed

Thomas Morell (1703–1784) had worked with Handel before on several oratorios. He and Handel were good friends; the composer left the librettist 200 pounds in his will. Morell's source for the libretto was The Martyrdom of Theodora and of Didymus (1687) by Robert Boyle, a prominent scientist and theologian. He also borrowed from Corneille's Théodore, Vierge et Martyre.

Handel finished the oratorio on 31 July 1749, and its premiere was on 16 March 1750. Theodora was a failure with the public and was performed only three times. There are at least two explanations for this. First, the theme of the persecution and martyrdom of a Christian saint may have been too removed from the Old Testament narratives to which Londoners had become accustomed in Handel's other dramatic oratorios. Second, an earthquake that had occurred about a week before the premiere caused some of Handel's usual patrons to flee the city. It was the least performed of all his oratorios, being revived only once in 1755.

Some of Handel's patrons appreciated the work, however. Lord Shaftesbury wrote in a letter to a friend

I can't conclude a letter and forget Theodora. I have heard the work three times and will venture to pronounce it as finished, beautiful and labour'd [well worked-out] a composition as ever Handel made. To my knowledge, this took him up a great while in composing. The Town don't like it at all, but ... several excellent musicians think as I do.

One of Handel's most loyal and enthusiastic supporters, Mary Delany, wrote to her sister Ann saying "Don't you remember our snug enjoyment of "Theodora?" Her sister replied "Surely "Theodora" will have justice at last, if it was to be again performed, but the generality of the world have ears and hear not".

There are two surviving quotations of Handel about Theodora. Morell quotes Handel as saying, "The Jews will not come to it because it is a Christian story; and the ladies will not come because it is a virtuous one." Handel's colleague Charles Burney took note when two musicians asked for free tickets for Messiah and Handel responded "Oh, your servant, meine Herren! you are damnable dainty! you would not go to Theodora – there was room enough to dance there, when that was perform!"

Theodora was actually Handel's favorite of his oratorios. The composer himself ranked the final chorus of act 2, "He saw the lovely youth", far beyond" "Hallelujah" in Messiah.

It has sometimes been staged as an opera, as in 1996 Glyndebourne and 2009 Salzburg Festival productions. Both of them were recorded and released as DVDs.

The original libretto included an extra scene in which Septimius himself converts to Christianity, but it was never set by Handel, though it was printed. The second scene in act 2 was also subject to several revisions by Handel.

== Dramatis personae ==
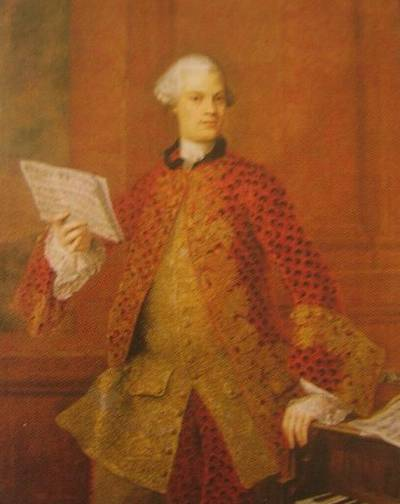
Gaetano Guadagni, creator of the role of Didymus in Theodora

Roles, voice types, and premiere cast
Role	Voice type	Premiere cast, 16 March 1750
Theodora, a Christian of noble birth	soprano	Giulia Frasi
Didymus, a Roman Officer, converted by and in love with Theodora	alto castrato	Gaetano Guadagni
Septimius, another Roman soldier and friend to Didymus	tenor	Thomas Lowe
Valens, President of Antioch	bass	Henry Reinhold
Irene, a Christian and friend of Theodora	mezzo-soprano	Caterina Galli
Messenger	tenor	
Chorus of Christians, Chorus of Heathens

== Synopsis ==
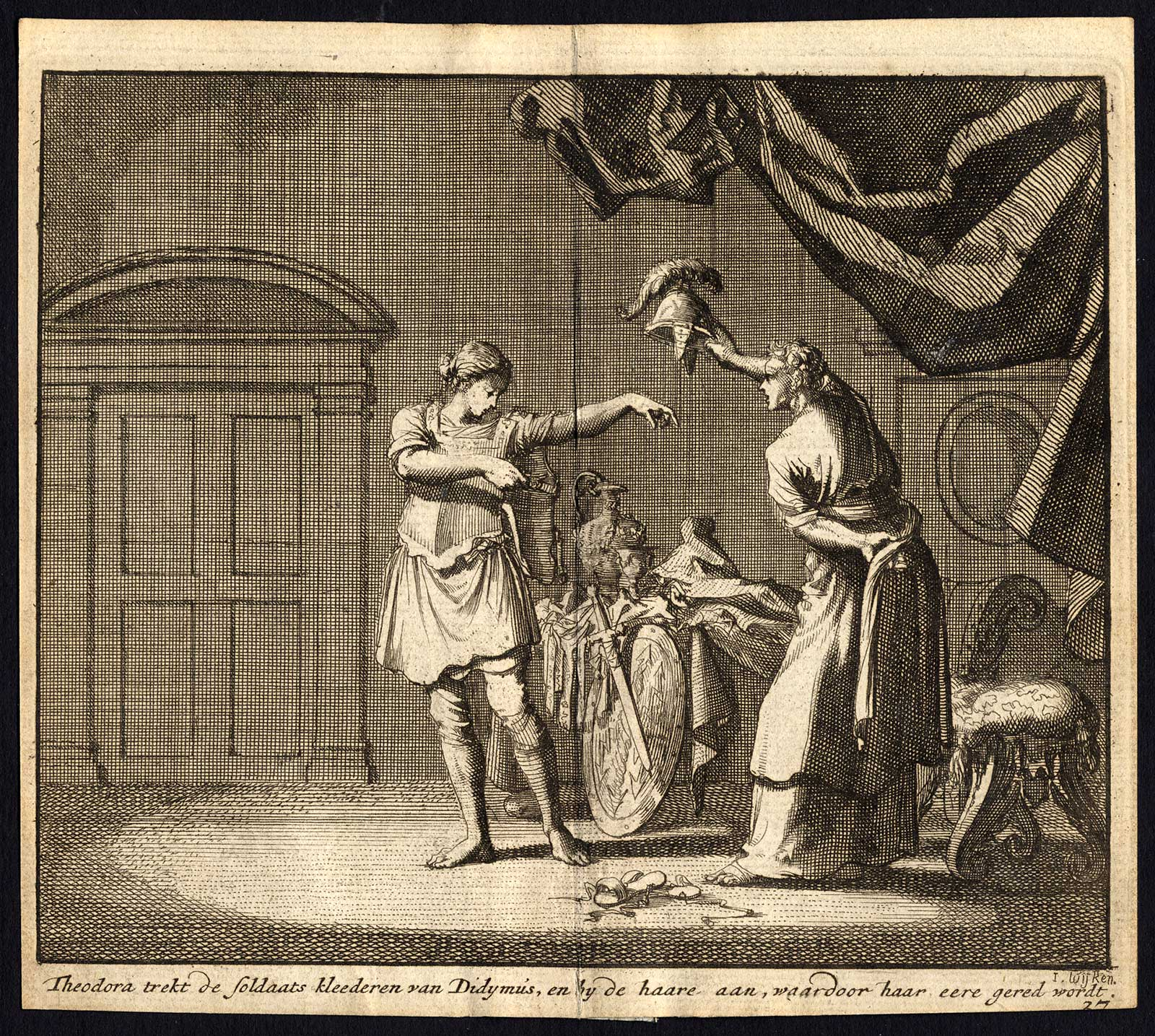
Theodora and Didymus exchange clothes in the brothel

=== Act 1 ===
The 4th century AD. Valens, the Roman governor of Antioch, issues a decree that in honour of Diocletian's birthday all citizens will on pain of death, offer sacrifice to Venus, the Roman goddess of love, and Flora, a fertility goddess of the spring, and he puts Septimius in charge of enforcing this.

Didymus, a soldier secretly converted to Christianity, asks that citizens whose consciences prevent them making sacrifices to idols be spared punishment, which Valens dismisses. Septimius suspects Didymus is a Christian and affirms his own loyalty to the law although he pities those who will be condemned to die by the decree and wishes he could be allowed to extend mercy to them.

Theodora, a nobly born Christian and her friend Irene are worshipping with their fellow believers in private rather than joining in the festival for the emperor's birthday when a messenger brings news of Valens' decree. Septimius comes to arrest them – Theodora expects to be put to death but is informed that instead she has been sentenced to serve as a prostitute in the temple of Venus. Theodora would much have preferred to die, but is led away to the temple. Irene informs Didymus who goes in the hope of either rescuing her or dying with her. The first act closes with a chorus of Christians praying for the mission's success.

=== Act 2 ===
At the start of the second act the festival in honour of the emperor and the goddesses is being enjoyed by the pagans. Valens sends Septimius to tell Theodora that if she doesn't join in with the festival by the end of the day, he will send his guards to rape her. The crowd expresses their satisfaction at this sentence. In the temple of Venus which serves as a brothel, Theodora is frightened, but her mood changes as she contemplates the afterlife. Didymus confesses to his friend and superior officer Septimius that he is a Christian and appeals to the other man's sense of decency. Septimius allows Didymus to visit Theodora. At first Theodora appeals to Didymus to kill her and put an end to her suffering, but instead Didymus persuades her to conceal her identity by putting on his helmet and his uniform and escaping, leaving Didymus in her place. Back at their hideout, Irene and the Christians recall the miracle of The Widow of Nain and hope that, should the lovers die, they will find a new life in heaven.

=== Act 3 ===
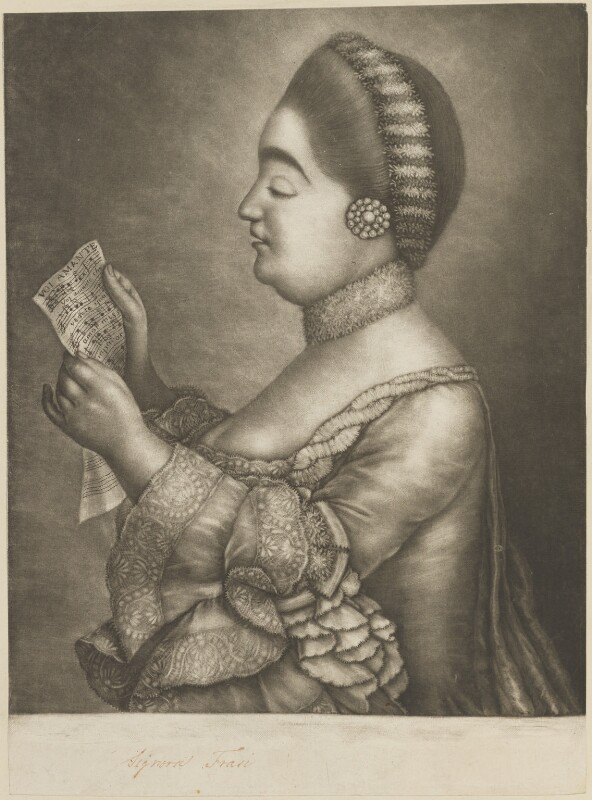
Giulia Frasi, who originated the role of Theodora

As the third part opens the Christians celebrate Theodora's safe return. However she feels guilty that she endangered Didymus's life in order to save her own. A messenger informs them that Didymus has been captured and that Valens has changed Theodora's punishment to death. Theodora goes to offer herself in Didymus' place, despite the protests of her faithful friend Irene. As Valens sentences Didymus to be executed, Theodora enters demanding that she die and Didymus be saved. Both Didymus and Theodora argue that they should die in place of the other. Septimius is moved by this, and pleads for clemency. Valens, however, condemns both Didymus and Theodora to death and they sing a duet to their immortality.

== Music and musical characterisation ==
The oratorio is scored for 2 sections of violins, violas, cellos, double basses, 2 flutes, 2 oboes, 2 bassoons, 1 contrabassoon, 2 horns, 2 trumpets, timpani, harpsichord, and organ. A harpsichord and violoncello play the continuo.

Handel's music gives the choruses of Roman pagans, presented in the libretto as evil people gloating over the torture of Christians, "immense verve and charm". This is contrasted with the quiet, deep conviction of the music for the choruses of Christians. The chorus "He saw the lovely youth", Handel's favorite of all the choruses he wrote, depicts Jesus' raising from the dead of the widow's son in Luke, chapter 7. Beginning with slow and solemn chromatic figures in a minor key, the music switches to major as the youth returns to life and ends with joy as the boy is restored to his mother. The work is notable for many passages of exalted and radiant beauty as well as for skilled characterisation through music. There are three duets, the last being a sublime piece in which Theodora and Didymus die.

Handel uses trumpets, horns, and drums in the Roman scenes. Flutes are introduced in the prison scene, but some arias are very lightly accompanied which raises them far above the text.

== List of musical numbers ==
(Note: "Symphony" in this context means a purely instrumental piece, a sinfonia. "Accompagnato" is a recitative accompanied by the orchestra, rather than by continuo instruments only, as in the passages marked "recitative".)

Act 1
Scene 1 Valens, Didymus, Septimius, Chorus of Heathens
1. Overture – Trio – Courante
2. Recitative (Valens) "'Tis Dioclesian's natal day"
3. Air (Valens) "Go, my faithful servant, go"
4. Chorus of Heathens "And draw a blessing down"
5. Recitative (Didymus, Valens) "Vouchsafe, dread sir"
6. Air (Valens) "Racks, gibbets, sword and fire"
7. Chorus of Heathens "For ever thus stands fix'd the doom"
Scene 2
8. Recitative (Didymus) "Most cruel edict"
9. Air (Didymus) "The raptur'd soul"
10.Recitative (Septimius) "I know thy virtues"
11. Air (Septimius) "Descend, kind pity"

Scene 3 Theodora, with the Christians

12. Recitative (Theodora) "Though hard, my friends"
13. Air (Theodora) "Fond, flatt'ring world, adieu!"
14. Recitative (Irene) "O bright example of all goodness!"
15. Air (Irene) "Bane of virtue"
16. Chorus of Christians "Come, mighty Father"

Scene 4 Enter Messenger

17. Recitative (Messenger, Irene) "Fly, fly, my brethren"
18. Air (Irene) "As with rosy steps the morn"
19. Chorus of Christians "All pow'r in Heav'n above"

Scene 5 Enter Septimius

20. Recitative (Septimius) "Mistaken wretches!"
21. Air (Septimius) "Dread the fruits of Christian folly"
22. Recitative (Theodora, Septimius) "Deluded mortal!"
23. Accompagnato (Theodora) "Oh, worse than death indeed!"
24. Air (Theodora) "Angels, ever bright and fair"

Scene 6 Enter Didymus

25. Recitative (Didymus, Irene) "Unhappy, happy crew!"
26. Air (Didymus) "Kind Heav'n"

Scene 7

27. Recitative (Irene) "O love, how great thy pow'r!"
28. Chorus of Christians "Go, gen'rous, pious youth"

Act 2
Scene 1 Valens, and Chorus of Heathens
29. Recitative (Valens) "Ye men of Antioch"
30. Chorus of Heathens "Queen of summer, queen of love"
31. Air (Valens) "Wide spread his name"
32. Recitative (Valens) "Return, Septimius, to the stubborn maid"
33. Chorus of Heathens "Venus laughing from the skies"
Scene 2 Theodora, in her Place of Confinement
34. Symphony
35. Recitative (Theodora) "O thou bright sun!"
36. Air (Theodora) "With darkness deep"
37. Symphony
38. Recitative (Theodora) "But why art thou disquieted, my soul?"
39. Air (Theodora) "Oh, that I on wings could rise"
Scene 3 Didymus and Septimius
40. Recitative (Didymus, Septimius) "Long have I known thy friendly social soul"
41. Air (Septimius) "Though the honours"
42. Recitative (Didymus, Septimius) "Oh, save her then"
43. Air (Didymus) "Deeds of kindness to display"
Scene 4 Irene, with the Christians
44. Recitative (Irene) "The clouds begin to veil"
45. Air (Irene) "Defend her, Heav'n!"
Scene 5 Theodora's Place of Confinement.
Didymus at a distance, the vizor of his helmet clos'd
46. Recitative (Didymus) "Or lull'd with grief"
47. Air (Didymus approaching her) "Sweet rose and lily"
48. Recitative (Theodora starting, Didymus) "Oh, save me, Heav'n!"
49. Air (Theodora) "The pilgrim's home"
50. Accompagnato (Didymus, Theodora) "Forbid it, Heav'n!"
51. Duet (Theodora, Didymus) "To thee, thou glorious son of worth"
Scene 6 Irene, with the Christians
52. Recitative (Irene) "Tis night, but night's sweet blessing is denied"
53. Chorus of Christians "He saw the lovely youth"

Act 3
Scene 1 Irene, with the Christians
54. Air (Irene) "Lord, to Thee each night and day"
Scene 2 Enter Theodora, in the habit of Didymus
55. Recitative (Irene, Theodora discovering herself) "But see, the good, the virtuous Didymus!"
56. Air (Theodora) "When sunk in anguish and despair"
57. Solo and Chorus (Christians, Theodora) "Blest be the hand"
Scene 3 Enter Messenger
58. Recitative (Messenger, Irene, Theodora) "Undaunted in the court stands Didymus"
59. Duet (Irene, Theodora) "Whither, Princess, do you fly?"
60. Recitative (Irene) "She's gone"
61. Air (Irene) "New scenes of joy"
Scene 4 Valens, Didymus, Septimius, and Chorus of Heathens
62. Recitative (Valens, Didymus, Theodora, Septimius) "Is it a Christian virtue then?"
Scene 5
63. Air (Septimius) "From virtue springs each gen'rous deed"
64. Air (Valens) "Cease, ye slaves, your fruitless pray'r!"
65. Recitative (Didymus, Theodora) "'Tis kind, my friends"
66. Chorus of Heathens "How strange their ends"
67. Recitative (Didymus, Theodora, Valens) "On me your frowns"
68. Air (Valens) "Ye ministers of justice"
Scene 6
69. Recitative (Didymus, Theodora, Septimius) "And must such beauty suffer?"
70. Air and Duet (Didymus, Theodora) "Streams of pleasure ever flowing"
Scene 7 Irene, with the Christians
71. Recitative (Irene) "Ere this, their doom is past"
72. Chorus of Christians "O love divine"

== Productions ==
The 1996 production by William Christie with the Orchestra of the Age of Enlightenment and the Glyndebourne Festival Chorus, produced by Peter Sellars, was described as a "landmark". Dawn Upshaw sang Theodora, David Daniels sang Didymus, and the execution of each lead character was set "on a gurney in a Texas military hospital awaiting execution" by lethal injection. Lorraine Hunt Lieberson sang Irene. A DVD of the production was available from the Glyndebourne online shop.

In 2022, the Royal Opera House in London staged its first production since the 1750 premiere. Directed by Katie Mitchell, the production was set in "an alternative modern-day reality".

== Recordings ==
=== Audio recordings ===
Theodora discography, audio recordings
Year	Cast: Theodora, Didymus, Irene, Septimius, Valens	Conductor, orchestra and chorus	Label
1969	Heather Harper, Maureen Forrester, Maureen Lehane, Alexander Young, John Lawrenson	Johannes Somary, English Chamber Orchestra, Amor Artis Chorale	Vanguard Classics; Cat: B0000254IV
1990	Roberta Alexander, Jochen Kowalski, Jard van Nes, Hans Peter Blochwitz, Anton Scharinger	Nikolaus Harnoncourt, Concentus Musicus Wien, Arnold Schoenberg Chor	Teldec Das Alte Werk; Cat: 2564 69056-4
1992	Lorraine Hunt Lieberson, Drew Minter, Jennifer Lane, Jeffrey Thomas, David Thomas	Nicholas McGegan, Philharmonia Baroque Orchestra, U. C. Berkeley Chamber Chorus	Harmonia Mundi; Cat: HMU907060.62
1996	Dawn Upshaw, David Daniels, Lorraine Hunt Lieberson, Richard Croft, Frode Olsen	William Christie, Orchestra of the Age of Enlightenment, Glyndebourne Festival Chorus	Glyndebourne CD
2000	Susan Gritton, Robin Blaze, Susan Bickley, Paul Agnew, Neal Davies	Paul McCreesh, Gabrieli Players, Gabrieli Consort	Archiv; Cat: 0289 469 0612
2001	Johanette Zomer, Sytse Buwalda, Helena Rasker, Knut Schoch, Tom Sol, Marco Schweizer	Cologne Chamber Choir, Collegium Cartusianum, Peter Neumann	MDG 332 1019-2 CD MDG 932 1019-5 DVD www.mdg.de
2003	Sophie Daneman, Daniel Taylor, Juliette Galstian, Richard Croft, Nathan Berg	William Christie, Les Arts Florissants, Les Arts Florissants	Erato; Cat: 0809274318121
2012	Christina Wieland, Franz Vitzthum, Diana Schmid, Knut Schoch, Klaus Mertens	Joachim Carlos Martini, Frankfurt Baroque Orchestra, Junge Kantorei	Naxos; Cat: 8.572700-02
2021	Lisette Oropesa, Paul-Antoine-Bénos-Djian, Joyce DiDonato, Michael Spyres, John Cest	Maxim Emelyanychev, Il Pomo D'oro,	Erato; Cat.: 5419717791

=== Video recordings ===
Theodora discography, video recordings
Year	Cast: Theodora, Didymus, Irene, Septimius, Valens	Conductor, orchestra and chorus	Producer	Label
1996	Dawn Upshaw, David Daniels, Lorraine Hunt Lieberson, Richard Croft, Frode Olsen	William Christie, Orchestra of the Age of Enlightenment, Glyndebourne Festival Chorus	Peter Sellars	DVD: Glyndebourne DVDs
2009	Christine Schäfer, Bejun Mehta, Bernarda Fink, Joseph Kaiser, Johannes Martin Kränzle	Ivor Bolton, Freiburger Barockorchester, Salzburger Bachchor	Christof Loy	DVD: Naxos; Cat: 705708 Blu-ray: 705804
