= Caterina Galli =

Italian opera singer

Caterina Galli (c. 1723 – 1804) was an Italian operatic mezzo-soprano. She first rose to fame in England in the 1740s and early 1750s where she was particularly admired for her performances in the works of George Frideric Handel. She then enjoyed success in her native country in the 1750s and 1760s, before returning to England, where she remained active as a performer up through 1797.

== Early life and career ==
Nothing is known of Galli's early training and career other than that it took place in her native country. The first definitive account of the singer was in 1742 when she arrived in London with fellow opera singer Giulia Frasi. She made her first appearance on the London stage on 12 December 1742 as Artaserse in the world premiere of Giuseppe Ferdinando Brivio's Mandane. Music historian Charles Burney wrote that, "Galli, after transplantation from Italy, took root in this country, and remained here in great public favor for many years." Her operatic repertoire consisted mainly of breeches roles. In 1753, she sang the role of the Spirit in the premiere of the final revision of Thomas Arne's Alfred.

Galli's lasting legacy was her work as an oratorio singer. A pupil of George Frideric Handel, she notably sang in the world premieres of Judas Maccabaeus (1747, Israelite man), Joshua (1747, Othniel), Alexander Balus (1748, title role), Solomon (1749, title role), Susanna (1749, Joachim), Theodora (1749, Irene), and Jephtha (1752, Storgé). She also appeared at the King's Theatre in the premieres of two of Handel's pastiches, Rossane o Alessandro nell'Indie (1743) and Lucio Vero (1747), and performed in revivals of several of his other oratorios and operas.

== Return to Italy ==
In 1754, Galli returned to Italy, where she spent most of a period of 10 years performing in major opera houses in Genoa, Naples, and Venice. On 10 July 1758, she created the role of Valentiniano III in the world premiere of Gaetano Latilla's Ezio at the Teatro di San Carlo in Naples. She also performed in several other premieres at that house, including the roles of Medarse in Pasquale Errichelli's Siroe on 26 December 1759; Teagene in Johann Adolph Hasse's Achille in Sciro on 4 November 1759; and Arpalice in Niccolò Piccinni's Ciro riconosciuto. At the Teatro San Benedetto in Venice, she portrayed the role of Giulia Mammea in the world premiere of Antonio Sacchini's Alessandro Severo during the carnival season of 1763. In the summer of 1766, she created the title role in the premiere of Josef Mysliveček's Semiramide (the composer's first opera) at the Teatro di Cittadella in Bergamo. Mysliveček was still a resident of Prague when Galli performed in the opera theatre there, the Divadlo v Kotcích, between 1760 and 1762, and he may have sought her out to star in his first opera as a result of a positive impression of her singing in Prague.

== Later life and career in England ==
After 1770, Galli was once again committed to the London stage. She had a particular triumph as the contralto soloist in Handel's Messiah at the Haymarket Theatre in 1773. That same year she sang the role of Aniceto in Antonio Sacchini's Lucio Vero to great success at the King's Theatre opposite soprano Cecilia Davies. She was mainly active at the King's Theatre for the remainder of her career, performing both serious and comic roles. In 1777, she announced her retirement and gave a farewell concert in London on 30 May of that year.

Galli was a close friend of fellow singer Martha Ray, who was the longtime mistress of John Montagu, 4th Earl of Sandwich. She was notably with Ray the night that Ray was murdered by James Hackman following a performance of Thomas Arne's and Isaac Bickerstaffe's comic opera Love in a Village at Covent Garden on 7 July 1779. Galli came out of retirement in her 60s when she began to experience financial difficulties. She appeared as an oratorio singer and in operas at Covent Garden as late as 1797 when she was 70 years old. These later performances, however, were not as well-received as those during her earlier career. She lived in London until her death in 1804.
