= Ezio (Latilla) =

1758 opera eroica or "heroic" opera in 3 acts by Gaetano Latilla

Ezio is an opera eroica or "heroic" opera in 3 acts by Gaetano Latilla. The opera uses an Italian-language libretto by Pietro Metastasio. Metastasio's libretto was partly inspired by Jean Racine's play Britannicus and had earlier been set to music by George Frideric Handel in 1732. The work's protagonist is the fifth-century AD Roman general Flavius Aetius (Ezio in Italian), returned from his victory over Attila. Latilla's version premiered at the Teatro di San Carlo in Naples on 10 July 1758. The composer both directed and conducted the production and Vincenzo Re designed the sets used in the premiere. The cast included Giovanni Carestini in the title role, Caterina Gabrielli as Fulvia, Maddalena Galli as Onoria, Caterina Galli as Valentiniano III (Valentinian III), Gregorio Babbi as Massimo, and Antonio Ambrogi as Varo.
