= Frederick Charles Reinhold =

British singer and organist (1741–1815)

Frederick Charles Reinhold (11 February 1741 – 29 September 1815) was a British singer and organist. He was born in London, son of Henry Reinhold, a well-known singer, and his wife Sarah. According to the Dictionary of National Biography (1885–1900), the son was also known as Charles Frederick Reinhold.

Reinhold was a boy chorister at St Paul's Cathedral. His father died in 1751 and according to the DNB, he "was brought up by the Royal Society of Musicians". He created the role of Oberon in Christopher Smith's opera 'The Fairies' in 1755.

His voice appears to have broken in the late 1750s. He sang bass from 1758, beginning a long career as singer at Marylebone Gardens. Pergolesi's La serva padrona was successfully performed there, Reinhold taking the role of Uberto.

In 1760, Reinhold took up a position at St Peter's Church in Colchester. There, he met his future wife Lucia Reeves or Lucia Reeve, marrying in 1763. She was the sister of Clara Reeve and ran a local millinery with her mother Hannah and sisters.

He also sang at many of the Lent oratorios in 1784 and subsequent years, and in 1784 he was one of the principal basses at the Handel commemoration in Westminster Abbey. In the previous year he had been appointed organist of St. George-the-Martyr. He retired from public life in 1797.

Reinhold died in Somers Town on 29 Sept. 1815. He is described as an admirable singer, but a parsimonious man.
