= Jephtha (Handel) =

Oratorio by Georg Friedrich Händel

George Frideric Handel

Jephtha (HWV 70) is an oratorio (1751) by George Frideric Handel with an English language libretto by the Rev. Thomas Morell, based on the story of Jephtha in Judges (Chapter 11) and Jephthes, sive Votum (Jeptha, or the Vow) (1554) by George Buchanan. Whilst writing Jephtha, Handel was increasingly troubled by his gradual loss of sight, and this proved to be his last oratorio. In the autograph score, at the end of the chorus "How dark, O Lord, are thy decrees" he wrote "Reached here on 13 February 1751, unable to go on owing to weakening of the sight of my left eye."

The story revolves around Jephtha's rash promise to the Almighty that if he is victorious, he will sacrifice the first creature he meets on his return. He is met by his beloved daughter Iphis. However, an angel intervenes to stop the sacrifice, and Iphis only needs to dedicate her life to the Lord. (The more common interpretation is that Jephthah chooses to sacrifice his daughter, but a short reprieve is arranged, after which Iphis dutifully returns and is killed.)

Staged performance of material based on biblical subjects was forbidden in Great Britain at the time the work was premiered. Handel's final masterpiece was presented at Covent Garden Theatre on 26 February 1752, with the composer conducting, and with a cast that included John Beard as Jephtha and two divas of the opera stage, Giulia Frasi, Handel's prima donna since 1749, and Caterina Galli. It was presented without scenery or costumes and divided into three acts.

Today the work is recognised as one of Handel's most sublime masterpieces and is sometimes fully staged as an opera.

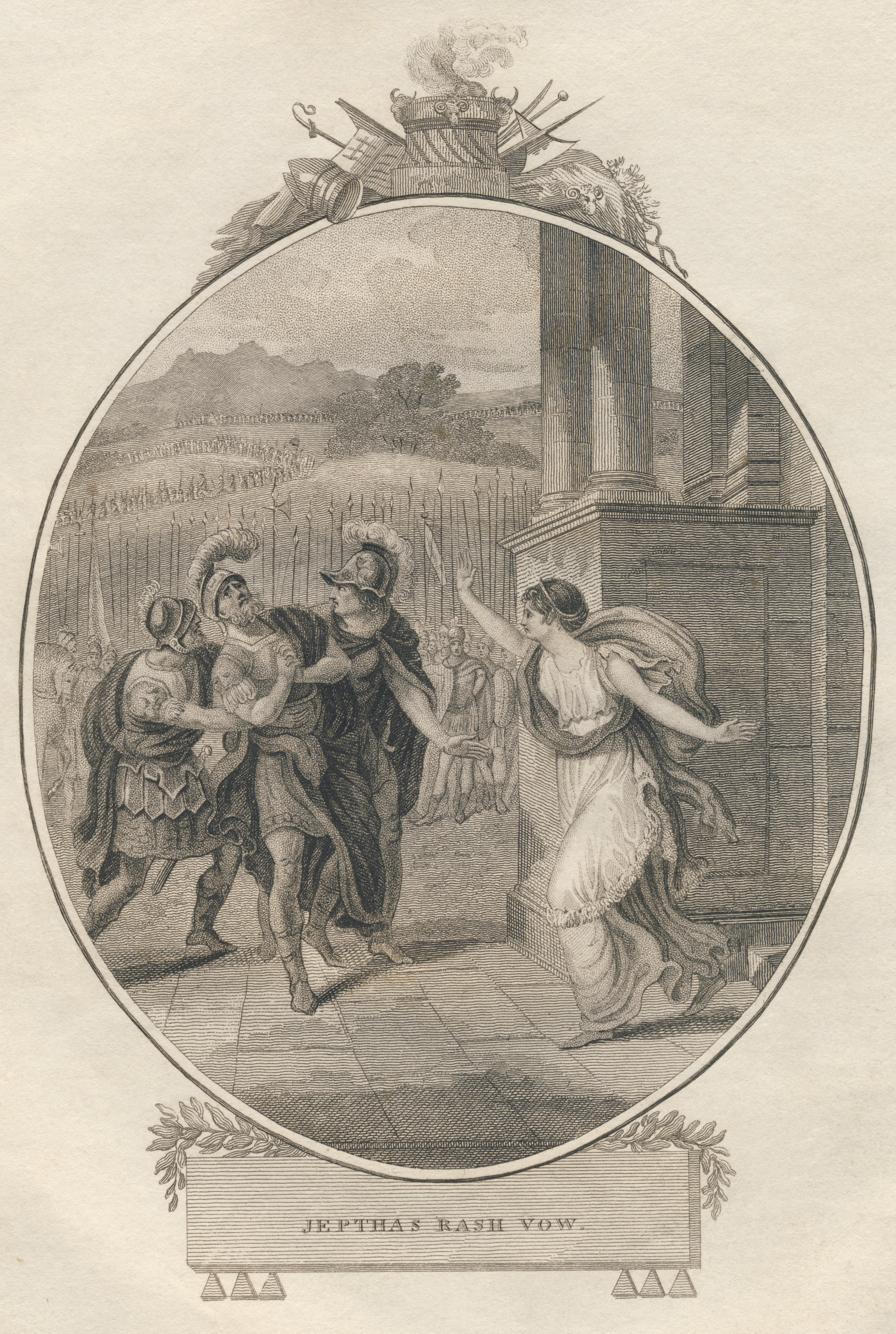
Jephtha's Rash Vow (1807), by James Gundee & M. Jones, London

== Dramatis personae ==
Roles, voice types, and premiere cast
Role	Voice type	Premiere cast 26 February 1752
Jephtha	tenor	John Beard
Iphis, his Daughter	soprano	Giulia Frasi
Storgé, his Wife	mezzo-soprano	Caterina Galli
Zebul, his Brother	bass	Robert Wass
Hamor, in love with Iphis	countertenor	Mr.Brent
Angel	soprano	Unknown boy soprano
Chorus of Israelites, chorus of priests, chorus of virgins

== Synopsis ==
=== Act 1 ===
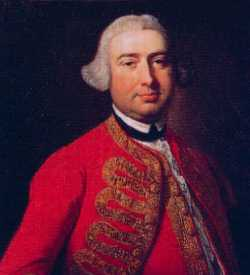
John Beard, who created the role of Jephtha

The Israelites have been under the rule of the neighbouring Ammonites for eighteen years and have adopted many of their ways and worship of their gods. They face the loss of their country and their religious identity unless they rebel, as Zebul tells them (Accompanied recitative: It must be so). Zebul advises them to recall his half-brother Jephtha from exile so he can lead them to freedom and to repent of their worship of the Ammonites' idols (Air: Pour forth no more unheeded pray'rs). The Israelites vow to stop their sacrifices to the Ammonite gods Moloch (a god associated with child sacrifice) and Chemosh and thenceforth to worship Jehovah only (Chorus: No more to Ammon's god and king). Jephtha, trusting in his own virtue, agrees to lead the Israelites in battle against their enemies on condition that if he is victorious he will be their leader in peacetime afterwards (Air: Virtue my soul shall still embrace). His wife Storgé supports his mission to win freedom for their country but will miss him sorely while he is away (Air: In gentle murmurs will I mourn). Iphis, only child of Jephtha and Storgé, is asked by her sweetheart Hamor to marry him soon (Air: Dull delay, in piercing anguish) but she tells him to prove himself worthy of her by fighting valiantly under her father's command first (Air: Take the heart you fondly gave). He agrees to this and the pair look forward to a happy future together after their country has achieved its freedom (Duet: These labours past, how happy we!) Jephtha, alone, vows to the Almighty that if he is allowed to win victory over Israel's enemies, he will sacrifice to God the first living thing he sees upon his return after the battle (Accompanied recitative: What mean these doubtful fancies of the brain?) The Israelites implore divine assistance (Chorus:O God, behold our sore distress). Jephtha's wife Storgé is unaware of her husband's rash vow but she is experiencing presentiments of tragedy (Air: Scenes of horror, scenes of woe). She explains to her daughter that she has had dreams of danger to Iphis, but Iphis attempts to dismiss her mother's nightmares as meaningless (Air: The smiling dawn of happy days). The Israelites have sent an embassy to the king of the Ammonites offering peace terms, but it has been rejected. Therefore, Jephtha orders the Israelites to prepare for war and they express their confidence that God will aid them (Chorus: When His loud voice in thunder spoke).

=== Act 2 ===
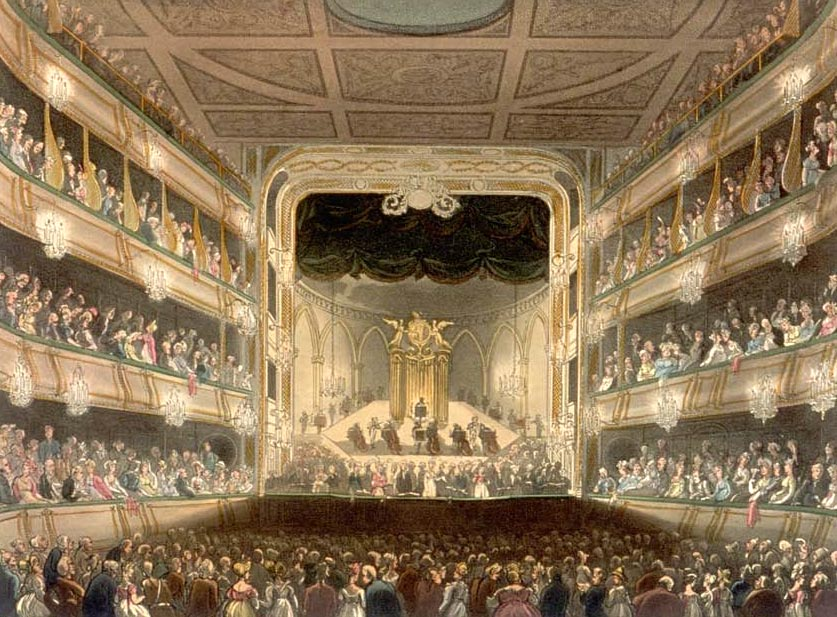
An 1808 engraving of Covent Garden Theatre, where Jephtha was first performed, on 26 February 1752

Hamor brings Iphis the welcome news that her father has utterly vanquished the Ammonites in battle. The Israelites celebrate their resounding victory, which they ascribe to angelic assistance (Chorus: Cherub and seraphim). Having proved himself in the battle, Hamor hopes that Iphis will now agree to marry him (Air: Up the dreadful steep ascending). Iphis prepares to go out to congratulate her father with other young girls, greeting him with song and dance (Air:Tune the soft melodious lute). Zebul is jubilant that Jephtha has won liberty for his people (Air: Freedom now once more possessing) but Jephtha insists that the glory is the Lord's (Air: His mighty arm, with sudden blow). The Israelites offer thanks to God (Chorus: In glory high, in might serene). Iphis leads a procession of young girls singing and dancing to welcome her father's return (Air: Welcome as the cheerful light and Chorus of Virgins: Welcome thou) but Jephtha is horrified that his daughter is the first living thing he has seen on his return and orders her to leave him. His vow requires him to sacrifice his only child, but he would prefer to die himself (Air: Open thy marble jaws, O tomb). He explains to his wife, brother and Hamor that having made this rash vow he must now kill his daughter. His wife vehemently rejects this horrific prospect (Accompanied recitative: First perish thou and air: Let other creatures die) and Hamor pleads to be allowed to die in his sweetheart's place (Air: On me let blind mistaken zeal). All three implore Jephtha not to carry out his cruel vow but he insists that he has no choice (Quartet: Oh, spare your daughter). Iphis returns, having heard of her father's vow (Accompanied recitative: Such news flies swift) and accepts that she must now be killed by the hand of her father (Air:Happy they). Jephtha is deeply anguished (Accompanied recitative: Deeper, and deeper still) but still feels he must fulfill his vow. The Israelites comment on the unknowable ways of God (Chorus: How dark, O Lord, are Thy decrees).

=== Act 3 ===
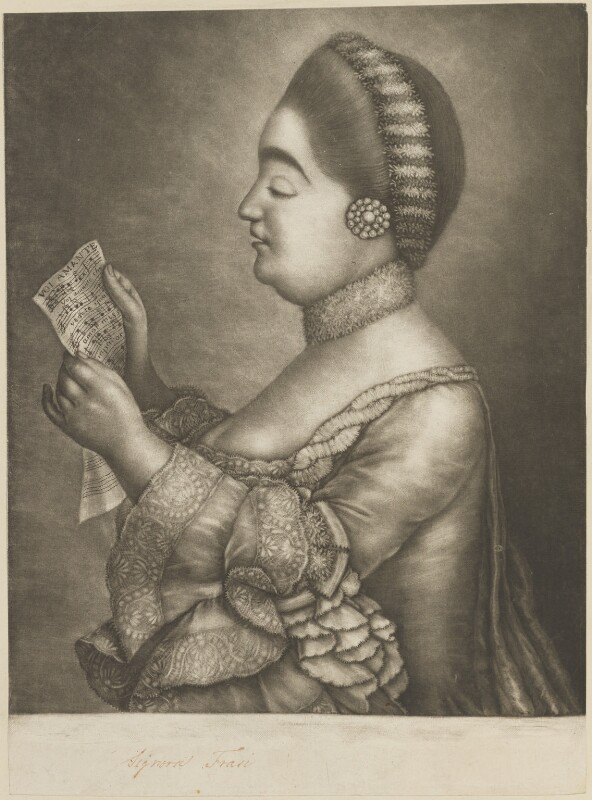
Giulia Frasi, soprano, creator of the role of Iphis

In intense distress, Jephtha prepares to take his beloved daughter's life (Accompanied recitative: Hide thou thy hated beams) and prays that she may be received into heaven (Air: Waft her, angels, through the skies). Iphis is resigned to her fate (Air: Farewell, ye limpid springs and floods) and the assembled priests preach submission to the divine will (Chorus of priests: Doubtful fear and rev'rent awe). As Jephtha lifts the sacrificial knife however, heavenly music is heard and an angel appears, declaring that human sacrifice is not pleasing to God. Iphis must be dedicated to God's service and stay a virgin through life, but she will live (Air: Happy, Iphis shalt thou live). The priests praise God's mercy (Chorus: Theme sublime of endless praise). The rest of Jephtha's family come in and Zebul proclaims that Iphis' faith and courage will forever be remembered (Air: Laud her, all ye virgin train). Storgé is relieved and happy that her daughter will not be put to death (Air: Sweet as sight to the blind) and Hamor is also glad Iphis will be safe though he mourns the fact that she can never be his wife (Air: 'Tis Heav'n's all-ruling pow'r). Iphis hopes he will find another love as she dedicates herself to serve God alone throughout her life (Air: All that is in Hamor mine) and promises to hold him in esteem as he accepts her decision (Duet: Freely I to Heav'n resign). All express their joy (Quintet: Joys triumphant crown thy days).

== Music and musical characterisation ==
The music of Jephtha is notable for its emotional intensity, directness and restraint. Iphis is characterised in her music as the epitome of faith, duty and resignation and her mother as an outraged matron. The numerous accompanied recitatives in the work capture the anguish of the characters. Jephtha's torment is searingly depicted in the music. His aria "Waft her angels, through the skies" became familiar out of the context of the whole piece.

== Selected recordings ==
Jephtha discography
Date	Cast: Jephtha, Iphis, Storgè, Hamor, Zebul	Conductor, Chorus and Orchestra	Label
Göttingen, June 13-16, 1988, live	Nigel Robson, Lynne Dawson, Lynne; Anne Sofie von Otter, Michael Chance, Stephen Varcoe	John Eliot Gardiner, Monteverdi Choir, English Baroque Soloists	Philips; CD: 422 351-2
Berlin, June 1992	John Mark Ainsley, Christiane Oelze, Catherine Denley, Axel Kohler, Michael George	Marcus Creed, RIAS‐Kammerchor, Akademie Fur Alte Musik Berlin	Brilliant Classics, CD: 94668 BR
London, January 2014	James Gilchrist, Sophie Bevan, Susan Bickley, Robin Blaze, Matthew Brook	Harry Christophers, The Sixteen, The Sixteen	Coro, CD: COR 16121
