= Thomas Morell =

Thomas Morell (/mɔːˈrɛl/; 18 March 1703 – 19 February 1784) was an English librettist, classical scholar, and printer.

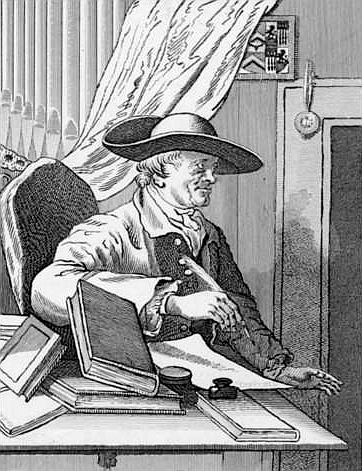
Thomas Morell, 1763 engraving by James Basire after William Hogarth.

== Life ==
He was born in Eton, Berkshire and educated at Eton College and King's College, Cambridge (BA, 1726, MA, 1730 and DD, 1743).

He was a Fellow of the Society of Antiquaries of London and in 1768 was elected a Fellow of the Royal Society as a "Rector of Buckland in Hertfordshire, Author of the Greek Thesaurus lately published, and Fellow of the Society of Antiquaries of London, a Gentleman well skilled in Natural History and every branch of Polite Literature".

He was appointed Garrison Chaplain at Portsmouth barracks in 1775.

Morell wrote the longest and most detailed surviving account of collaboration with Handel.

He died in 1784 and was buried in Chiswick, London.

== Librettos ==
He is best known as the librettist of the following of George Frideric Handel's oratorios:

- Judas Maccabaeus (1747).
- Joshua (1748).
- Alexander Balus (1748).
- Theodora (1750).
- The Choice of Hercules (1751). Uncertain if Morell was the librettist.
- Jephtha (1752).
- The Triumph of Time and Truth (1757). Morell was probably the librettist.
