= Pietro Domenico Paradies =

Italian composer (1707–1791)

Pietro Domenico Paradies (also Pietro Domenico Paradisi) (1707 – 25 August 1791) was an Italian composer, harpsichordist and music teacher, most prominently known for a composition popularly entitled "Toccata in A", which is, in other sources, the second movement of his Sonata No. 6.

A reviewer of a modern edition of his sonatas, all first edited by the composer, noted in passing "Paradies (never Paradisi, it seems)" suggesting that Paradisi might be a modern adaptation.

== Life and work ==
Paradies was born in Naples. Probably a student of Nicola Porpora, he dedicated himself at first to composing for the theater. He spent a few years around 1740 in Venice, where he taught and wrote music at the Ospedali Grandi. There, he composed two semi-dramatic, occasional serenatas, including a serenata in honor of Frederick Christian, the Prince of Saxony and Heir to Poland. In 1746 he moved to London, where he became known as a teacher of harpsichord and singing; among his students was Gertrud Elisabeth Mara, probably around 1750 and possibly Thomas Linley the elder. In 1770 he returned to Italy. He died in Venice.

== Instrumental and vocal music ==
His reputation is due to his music for the harpsichord, esteemed by music historians.

His musical style was influenced by Alessandro and Domenico Scarlatti. Especially celebrated above all were his twelve sonatas for clavicembalo (London, 1754). The Toccata in A that is still played often today is an Allegro movement from his sonata VI in A major, which has established for itself a considerable discography, although there has been a revival of more of his music recently, at least regarding the keyboard sonatas. He was also the author of concertos for organ and for harpsichord, individual pieces for harpsichord, arias and cantatas.

== Dramatic music ==
(Year produced, place, name)

- 1738 Lucca - Alessandro in Persia
- 1740 Venice - Il Decreto del Fato (The Decrees of Fate)
- 1740 Venice - Le Muse in gara
- 1747 London - Fetonte
- 1751 London - La forza d'amore
- Antioco
