= Giovanni Battista Lampugnani =

Italian composer

- Born: c. 1708; Milan
- Died: 2 June 1786; Milan
- Occupations: Composer; Harpsichordist

Giovanni Battista Lampugnani (c. 1708 – 2 June 1786) was an Italian composer, born in Milan. He studied in Naples where he made his debut as a composer of opera in 1732. In 1743 he went to London to take over the opera from Baldassare Galuppi at the King's Theatre, but he soon returned to Milan. Lampugnani later became the maestro al cembalo (meaning "master of the harpsichord") in 1779 at the Teatro alla Scala.

Lampugnani wrote thirty operas during his lifetime, such as Semiramide (1741), Rossane, Tigrane (1747), Artaserse, Siroe (1755) and L'amor contadino (1760). He also composed some non-operatic pieces, e.g., trio sonatas and church music.

He died in Milan.
