= Thomas Lowe (tenor) =

English singer and actor (died 1783)

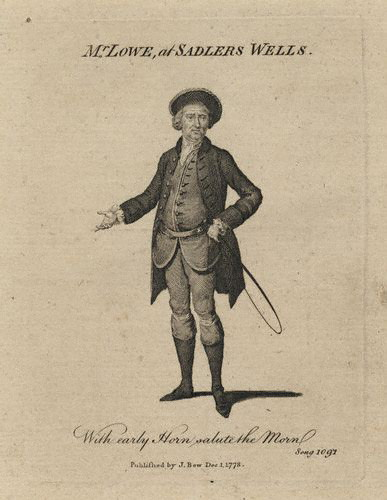
Thomas Lowe: an engraving of the singer in costume published in 1778

Thomas Lowe (c. 1719 – 1 March 1783) was an English tenor and actor. He appeared at the Theatre Royal, Drury Lane and at Covent Garden, and frequently performed in London's pleasure gardens. He was particularly associated with the works of Thomas Arne and George Frideric Handel.

== Life ==
Lowe sang as a child: in May 1732 he sang in Handel's oratorio Esther at the King's Theatre. His career as a tenor is first known in August 1740, when he took part in the masque Alfred by Thomas Arne, at its first performance at Cliveden, country home of Frederick, Prince of Wales. He first appeared at Theatre Royal, Drury Lane in London in September 1740, as Sir John Loverule in The Devil to Pay by Charles Coffey. During his first two seasons there he played Macheath in The Beggar's Opera, Bacchanal in Arne's Comus and Arne's songs in the incidental music for several productions.

From 1742 to 1750 he was also in Handel's oratorio company, taking part in the original productions of Samson, Susanna, Joshua, Solomon (as Zadok) and Theodora (as Septimius). Lowe was a member of the Madrigal Society between 1741 and 1751. From 1745 he performed regularly at Vauxhall Gardens, until about 1761.

From 1742 to 1744 Thomas Arne and his wife lived in Dublin, and Lowe also performed there during that period, at Smock Alley Theatre. In 1744 in Dublin he sang the lead in the first performance of Arne's oratorio The Death of Abel. Lowe later appeared at Aungier Street Theatre in Dublin, returning to Drury Lane in 1747.

From 1748, after the return of the tenor John Beard to Drury Lane after several years' absence, Lowe left the theatre and moved to Covent Garden. He appeared as Macheath in The Beggar's Opera in 1748, as Arviragus in Cymbeline in 1749, and as Colonel Bully in The Provoked Wife in 1752. In 1760, when Beard moved to Covent Garden, Lowe returned to Drury Lane; appearing in works including John Stanley's The Tears and Triumphs of Parnassus in 1760, and Shakespeare's Much Ado About Nothing (as Balthazar) and The Tempest (as Hymen).

He did not perform at either theatre after 1763; from that year he was lessee and manager of Marylebone Gardens. In 1769, after an unsuccessful season, he had to assign his interests in the gardens to trustees for the benefit of his creditors. In 1772 he was engaged by Thomas King to sing at Sadler's Wells, and he retained the engagement until his death on 1 March 1783.

His son Halifax Lowe was also a singer, making his first appearance at Sadler's Wells in 1784; he was said to have a similar voice to his father. He died in 1790, aged 28.
