= Susanna (Handel) =

English-language oratorio

George Frideric Handel

Susanna (HWV 66) is an oratorio by George Frideric Handel, in English. The libretto had been questionably attributed to Newburgh Hamilton but is now thought to have been penned by the poet/playwright Moses Mendes (d.1758). The story is based on that of Susanna in chapter 13 of the Book of Daniel in the Bible. Handel composed the music in the summer of 1748 and premiered the work the next season at Covent Garden theatre, London, on 10 February 1749.

The thirteenth chapter of the book of Daniel, considered apocryphal in Protestant tradition, tells how, during the captivity of the Jews in Babylon, a virtuous young woman was falsely accused of sexual promiscuity by two elders of the community who lusted after her themselves. The prophet Daniel exposed the two elders as liars and vindicated Susanna.

== Dramatis personae ==
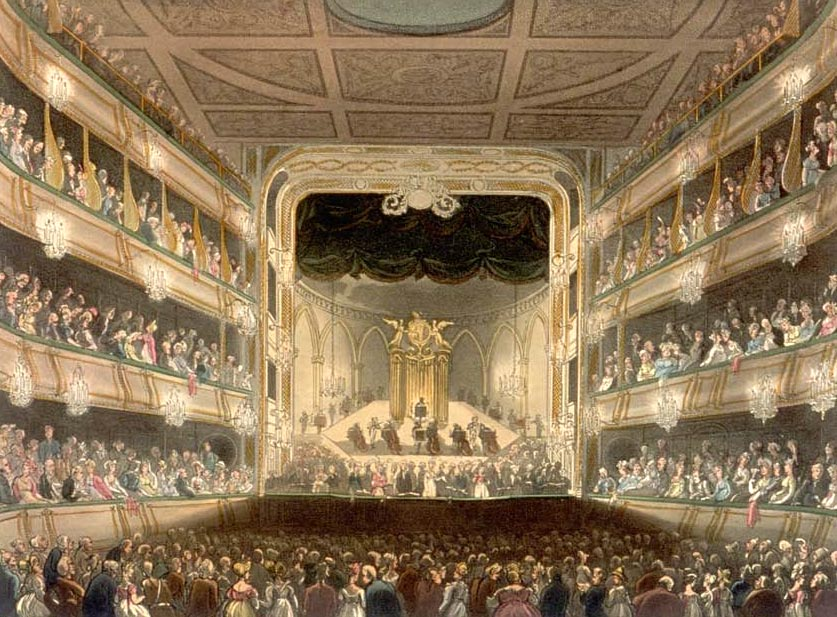
Covent Garden theatre in about 1808

Roles, voice types, and premiere cast
Role	Voice	1749 cast
Susanna	soprano	Giulia Frasi
Joacim, her Husband	alto	Caterina Galli
Chelsias, her Father	bass	Thomas Reinhold
Daniel	soprano	anonymous boy soprano
First Elder	tenor	Thomas Lowe
Second Elder	bass	Thomas Reinhold
Judge	bass	
An Attendant	soprano	Signora Sibilla (Pinto née Gronamann)
Chorus of Israelites		
Chorus of Babylonians		
Chorus		

== Synopsis ==
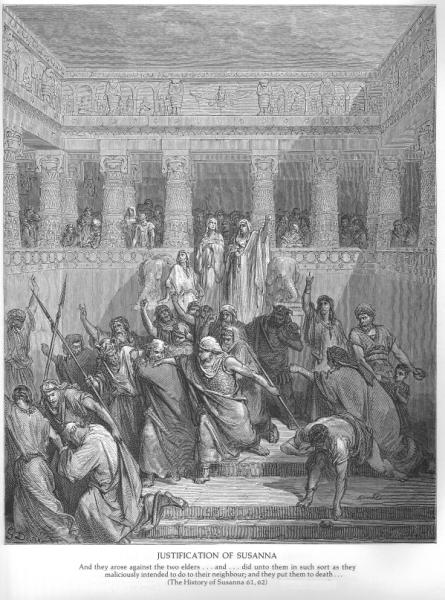
The prophet Daniel saving Susanna by Gustave Doré

=== Act 1 ===
The Israelites, in chorus, lament their captivity. Susanna and her husband Joacim sing of their happiness in marriage and Susanna's father of his pride in having such a model wife as his daughter. Joacim must leave town for some days and husband and wife bid farewell. Two elders of the community, both filled with lust for the beautiful Susanna, plan to force themselves upon her during her husband's absence. The chorus comments that such wickedness will call down heaven's anger.

=== Act 2 ===
Joacim, apart from his wife, sings of how much he misses her. Susanna, meanwhile, suffering from the hot weather, also misses her husband, and seeks relief from the sun by bathing in a stream in her garden. She is watched by the two elders whose advances she indignantly repulses. They take revenge by announcing to the community that they have caught Susanna having illicit sex with a young man and order her trial for adultery. Joacim is distressed to be informed of this by letter and returns home.

=== Act 3 ===
Susanna is found guilty and condemned to death. The First Elder pretends to be greatly distressed by this outcome. The very youthful prophet Daniel, little more than a boy, steps forward from the crowd and demands to be allowed to question the two Elders separately. They give conflicting stories of where they caught Susanna in illicit sex and Daniel denounces them as liars. The Elders are sentenced to execution, Susanna is re-united with her loving husband, and all praise Susanna's virtue and chastity.

== Background and composition ==
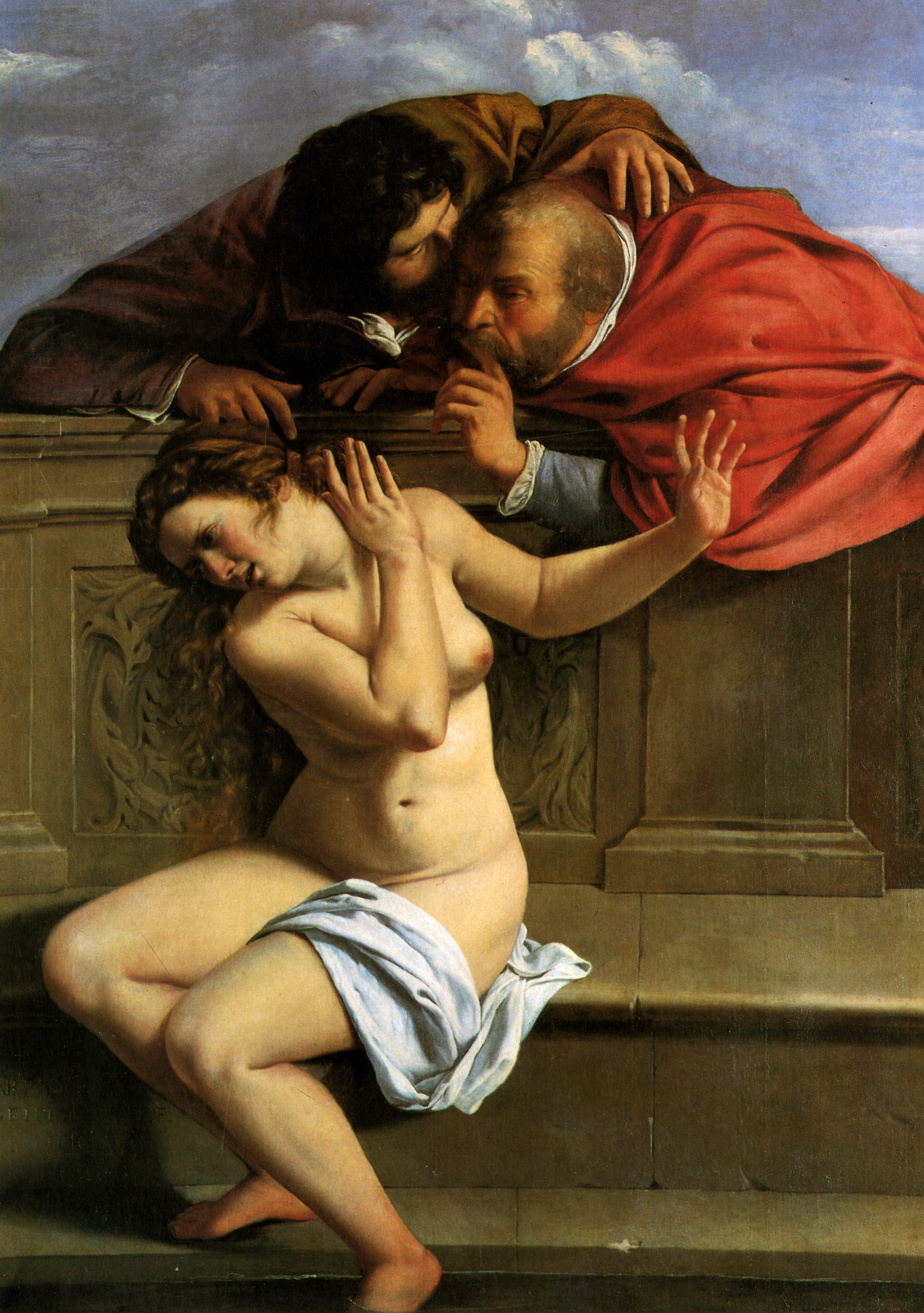
Susanna and the Elders by Artemisia Gentileschi

After a series of patriotic English oratorios celebrating victory in the Jacobite rebellions, including Judas Maccabaeus and Joshua, Handel turned to a lighter operatic style with Susanna. The oratorio is scored for a small orchestra of strings with oboes and bassoons, with trumpets appearing in the music only in the celebrations at the end of the work. Some of the solo vocal pieces are in the simple style of popular English ballad opera. There are touches of comedy in Handel's musical characterisations of the lecherous Elders, while the steadfastness, purity and courage of the heroine Susanna are vividly portrayed. The aria "Crystal streams", sung by Susanna while she longs for her absent husband and seeks relief from the summer heat by bathing in a garden stream, is particularly notable. The powerful choruses in the work serve as a commentary on the action.

== Recordings ==
Susanna discography
Year	Cast: Susanna, Joacim, Daniel, Chelsias, First Elder, Second Elder	Conductor, orchestra and chorus	Label
1989	Lorraine Hunt Lieberson, Drew Minter, Jill Feldman, William Parker, Jeffrey Thomas, David Thomas	Nicholas McGegan; Philharmonia Baroque Orchestra U. C. Berkeley Chamber Choir	CD:Harmonia Mundi France; Cat:HMU 907030.32
1999	Elisabeth von Magnus, Sytse Buwalda, Ruth Holton, John Elwes, Tom Sol	Peter Neumann; Collegium Cartusianum; Cologne Chamber Choir	CD: MDG; Cat: 332 0945-2
