= Alfred (Arne opera) =

1740 masque, later an opera

- Masque (later opera) by Thomas Arne
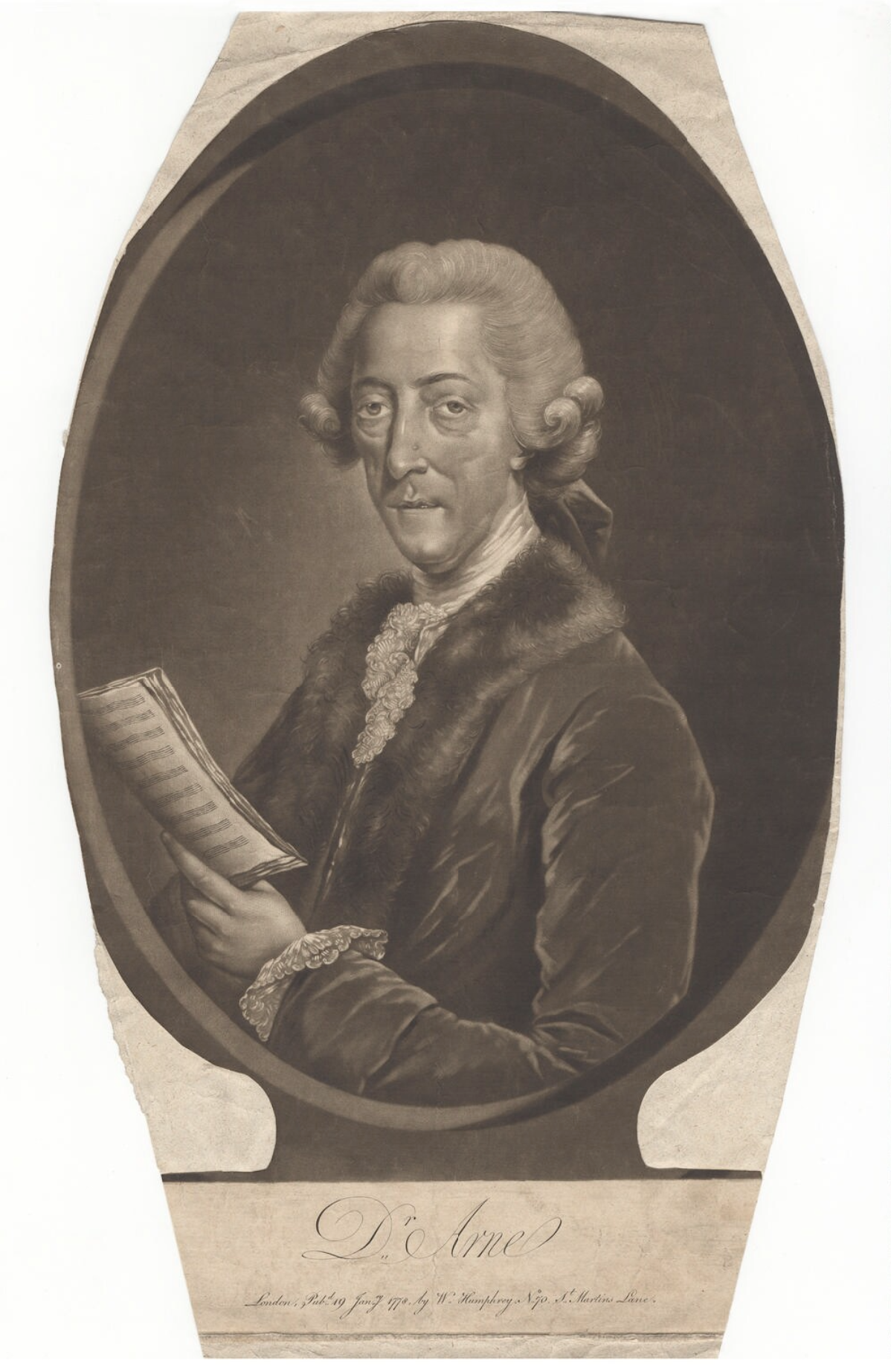
- 1778 portrait of Arne
- Librettist: David Mallet; James Thomson
- Based on: Life of Alfred the Great
- Premiere: 1 August 1740; Cliveden

Alfred is a sung stage work about Alfred the Great with music by Thomas Arne and libretto by David Mallet and James Thomson. The work was initially devised as a masque in 1740 and was first performed at Cliveden, country home of Frederick, Prince of Wales, on 1 August 1740 to commemorate the accession of his grandfather George I and the birthday of the Princess Augusta. Arne later revised the work turning it into an all-sung oratorio in 1745 and then an opera in 1753. It is best known for its finale "Rule, Britannia!".

== Background and performance history ==
Frederick, Prince of Wales made considerable efforts to demonstrate his British nationality and identity, to distinguish himself from his German father George II, with whom he was on very poor terms. The masque Alfred, to a text by David Mallet and James Thomson, was first performed at Frederick's country home at Cliveden on 1 August 1740. It was the ideal entertainment for him: a mixture of romantic heroism and British patriotism.

In its original form, Alfred contained only eight vocal sections and the overture, including the famous patriotic song "Rule, Britannia!". Arne later significantly expanded the work, and the printed score of 1753 runs to 27 musical numbers. The libretto included additional pieces, including several choruses, the music for which is now lost. An expanded version of the work was first performed in London in March 1745.

== Roles ==
Roles, voice types, premiere cast
Roles	Voice type	Premiere cast, 1 August 1740 Conductor: Thomas Arne
Alfred	tenor	Thomas Lowe
Emma/Venus	soprano	Kitty Clive
Spirit/Pallas/Paris	mezzo-soprano	Susannah Maria Cibber
Bard/Mercury	bass	

== Synopsis ==
The following synopsis is based on the work as performed in London at the King's Theatre in 1753 and the Drury Lane Theatre in 1754 and is the version performed by Bampton Classical Opera in 1998.

The setting is the Isle of Athelney in the year 878. Following a defeat by the Vikings, Alfred has taken refuge in the hut of the shepherd Corin and his wife Emma who wonder about the mysterious stranger. Alfred expresses his anguish at the state of affairs of his kingdom and prays to the Genius of Britannia. Alfred's wife Eltruda and his son Edward arrive and rejoice at finding him alive. Corin and Emma still have no idea who their guests really are.

"Rule, Britannia!"
Phonograph cylinder recorded by Albert Farrington in 1914 for Edison Records

Later, Edward brings news that twelve hundred Britons loyal to Alfred are camped nearby and awaiting his command. Emma and Corrin now realise the true identity of their guests as Alfred departs for battle. When news of his victory reaches them, all rejoice. Edward praises the return of British values. Alfred exhorts his people: "Britons, proceed, the subject deep command, awe with your navies ev'ry hostile land". In response, all sing "Rule Britannia", an ode in honour of Great Britain.

== Recordings ==
- Thomas Arne's Alfred – Orchestra of the Age of Enlightenment, Nicholas Kraemer (conductor), 1997. BBC Music Vol.V No. 10
- Thomas Arne: Alfred – Philarmonia Baroque Orchestra and Chorale, Nicholas McGegan (conductor), 1999. Deutsche Harmonia Mundi
