= Henry Reinhold =

German opera singer

Henry Reinhold (c. 1690 – 1751), also known as Thomas Reinhold, was a German opera singer.

He was born in Dresden, Electorate of Saxony, and showed an early aptitude for music, which his family apparently discouraged. But he secretly left Dresden to follow Handel, a friend of his reputed father, to London. There, through Handel's good offices, he came under the protection of Frederick, Prince of Wales, who ultimately stood sponsor to his eldest son.

In 1731 Reinhold, described as Reynholds, was singing at the Haymarket Theatre. He sang in the first performance of Handel's Arminio at Covent Garden on 12 January 1737, and created principal parts in many of Handel's operas and oratorios.

Reinhold was one of the founders, in 1738, of the Royal Society of Musicians. When vocal music was added to the other attractions of Vauxhall Gardens in 1745, Reinhold was one of the first singers engaged. He died in Chapel Street, Soho, on 14 May 1751, and on 20 May Garrick lent his theatre for a benefit performance for his widow and children.

According to some older sources including the Dictionary of National Biography (1885–1900), Reinhold was reputed to be the natural son of the "archbishop of Dresden". However, Dresden was not the seat of a catholic archdiocese or diocese at that time.

His son, Frederick Charles Reinhold, was a famed singer.

== Various names ==
According to his burial registration, Reinhold's name was "Henry", but he was referred to as "Theodore" by the Royal Society of Musicians, and as "Thomas" by the Dictionary of National Biography (1885–1900).
