= Daniel Sullivan =

Dan, Danny, or Daniel Sullivan may refer to:

== Arts and entertainment ==
- Daniel J. Sullivan (born 1940), American film and theater director
- Daniel G. Sullivan, American screenwriter
- Dan Sullivan (musician), indie rock musician
- Dan Panic, American punk rock drummer, real name Dan Sullivan
- Daniel Sullivan (countertenor) (died 1764), Irish opera singer
- Dan Sullivan (critic) (1935–2022), American theater critic
- Daniel Sully, American actor (1855-1910), born "Daniel Sullivan"

== Politics and government ==
=== United States ===
- Daniel V. Sullivan (1886–1966), New York judge and district attorney
- Dan Sullivan (Arkansas politician) (born 1963), member of Arkansas State Senate
- Daniel Sullivan (New Hampshire politician), member of the New Hampshire House of Representatives
- Dan Sullivan (Oklahoma politician) (born 1963), member of the Oklahoma House of Representatives
- Dan Sullivan (Anchorage mayor) (born 1951), Republican former mayor of Anchorage, Alaska
- Dan Sullivan (U.S. senator) (born 1964), Republican U.S. senator from Alaska
- Dan J. Sullivan (Petersburg, Alaska political candidate), candidate

=== Others ===
- Dan Sullivan (New Zealand politician) (1882–1947), New Zealand politician
- Dan Sullivan (Australian politician) (born 1960), from Western Australia

== Sports ==
- Dan Sullivan (baseball) (1857–1893), 19th-century Major League Baseball player
- Dan Sullivan (American football) (1939–2025), American football offensive lineman
- Daniel Sullivan (ice hockey, born 1947), former World Hockey Association goaltender
- Danny Sullivan (born 1950), American race car driver
- Danny Sullivan (rugby league) (born 1982), Australian rugby league player
- Daniel Sullivan (American football), American football coach
- Dan Sullivan (ice hockey, born 1981), Canadian ice hockey player
- Daniel Sullivan (ice hockey, born 1987), Canadian-born Italian ice hockey defenceman
- Danny Sullivan (footballer) (born 1994), association footballer for Torquay United F.C.

== Other people ==
- Danny Sullivan (technologist) (born 1965), American search engine expert
- Daniel Sullivan (Great Chicago Fire), American involved in the Great Chicago Fire
- Daniel Augustus Joseph Sullivan (1884–1941), American naval officer; Medal of Honor recipient
- Daniel Sullivan (entrepreneur), American entrepreneur and business executive
- Daniel Sullivan (frontiersman) (died 1790), 18th-century military figure in the North American frontier
- Daniel "Horse-Whisperer" Sullivan (died 1810), Irish horse trainer
- Daniel Y. Sullivan (1948–2012), American dentist

== Fictional characters ==
- Dan Sullivan (EastEnders), a character from the BBC soap opera EastEnders
- Danny Sullivan (Dream Team), a character from the British television series Dream Team
