= Andreoni =

Andreoni is an Italian and Corsican surname, derived from the given name Andrea. Notable people with the surname include:

- Cristian Andreoni (born 1992), Italian football player
- Giovanni Battista Andreoni (1720–1797), Italian castrato singer
- James Andreoni (born 1959), American economist
- Luis Andreoni (1853–1936), Italian engineer active in Uruguay
- Serge Andreoni (born 1940), French politician
- Wanda Andreoni (born 1949), Italian and Swiss physical chemist
