= Imeneo =

1740 opera by Handel

George Frideric Handel

Imeneo (alternative title: Hymen, HWV 41) is an opera seria in three acts by George Frideric Handel. The Italian-language libretto was adapted from Silvio Stampiglia's Imeneo. Handel had begun composition in September 1738, but did not complete the score until 1740.

By the time the work was performed in 1740, Handel had largely moved away from the operatic form in favour of oratorios. Audience reaction was mixed, and the work ran for only two performances. Two years later, after making substantial changes, Handel presented the work in Dublin, this time billing it as a serenata.

There were no further performances for nearly two centuries, until 1960. The Handel scholar Winton Dean attributes the lack of interest in the work over the years as being due not to any lack of quality, but rather the incomplete and chaotic state of the surviving material, and the absence of any reliable performing edition until that of Donald Burrows in 2002. Dean characterises the opera as "a little masterpiece", the best of all Handel's late operas with the exception of Serse.

== Synopsis ==
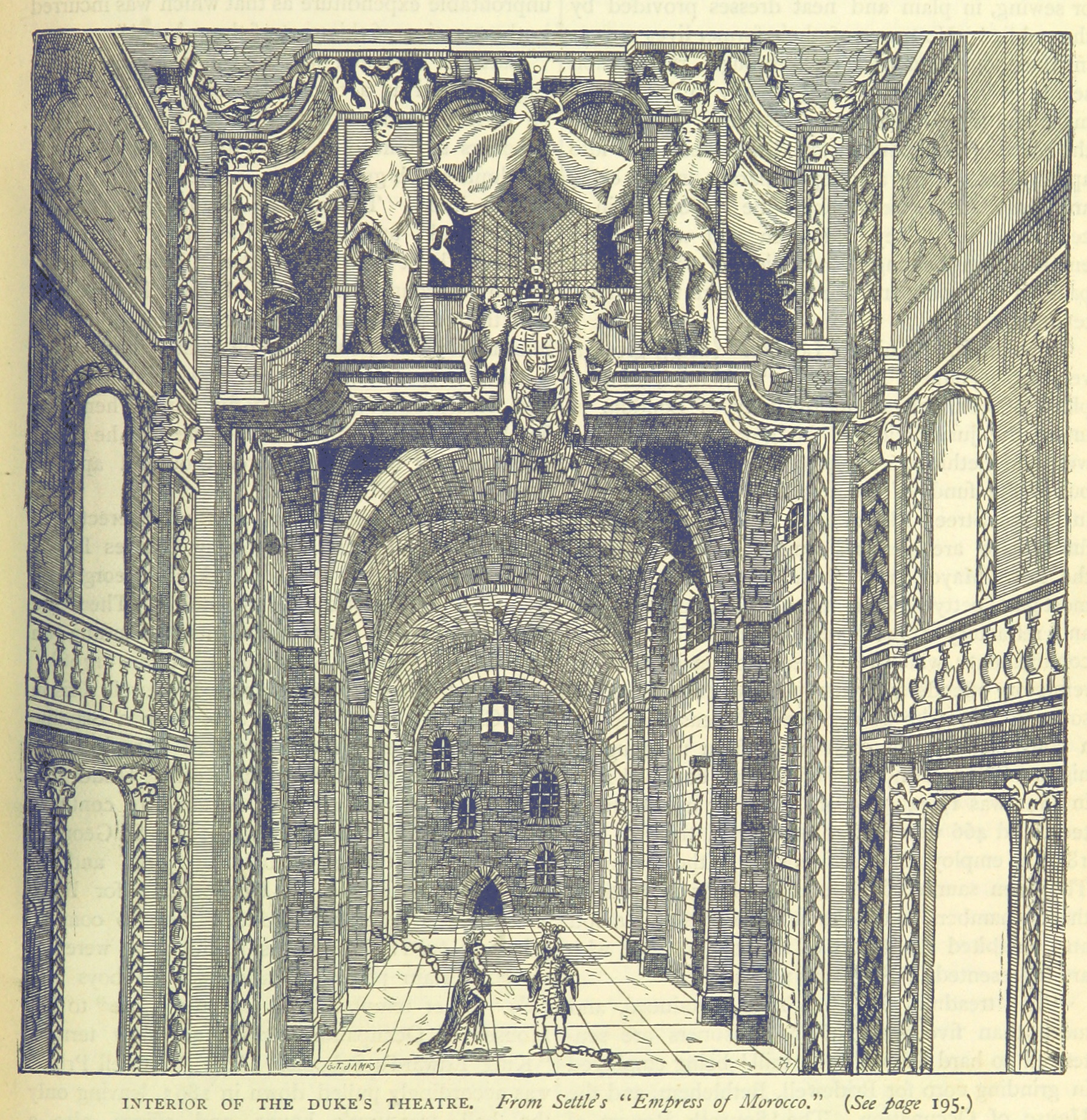
Interior of the Lincoln's Inn Fields Theatre, where Imeneo had its first performance

The opera's setting is "A Pleasant Garden" in Athens. While making their offerings to Ceres, goddess of fertility, the maidens of Athens have been set upon and abducted by pirates. Tirinto laments his lost love, Rosmene, while Argenio, an Athenian Senator, grieves for his daughter Clomiri, a friend of Rosmene.

Imeneo appears and announces that he has freed all the captives. In order to get close to his love Rosmene, he had been part of the maiden group making offerings, disguised in women's clothes, and had been swept up in the abductions. He boasts that while the pirates slept, he took the opportunity to kill them all.

There is general rejoicing, and when Imeneo demands to marry Rosmene in recognition of his great deed, Argenio and his fellow senators agree, telling Rosmene that it is her duty to accept Imeneo. Argenio attempts to persuade her of the power of gratitude by telling her the fable of Androcles and the Lion, in which the lion gratefully kisses Androcles rather than killing him, recognising him as the man who had once removed a thorn from his paw. Rosmene, however, loves Tirinto, and is conflicted between faithfulness to him and duty and gratitude toward Imeneo. Clomiri has feelings for Imeneo, and flirts with him, suggesting that he should transfer his affections to someone who already deeply loves him. But he is resolute and pretends not to understand Clomiri's advances.

Knowing that she must disappoint one of her suitors, Rosmene settles on a device for seemingly delegating the decision to a higher power. Feigning madness, she enacts a vision of Radamanto, one of the judges of the dead in the underworld, who cuts out her heart with his sword. Her heart will choose for her, after hearing from both suitors. She 'faints', and on coming round declares for Imeneo. The chorus sings of the need to bow down not to passion, but to reason; one should not follow feelings and fidelity, but gratitude and honour.

== History and text ==
Handel started work on Imeneo in September 1738, based on an Italian-language libretto adapted from Silvio Stampiglia's Imeneo. He initially intended that it should form part of a subscription series of operas to be put on by John James Heidegger, although in the event that did not take place. There were rumours at the time of the possible marriage of one of George III's daughters, and Handel may have wanted to have a suitable subject available should a wedding be announced. He made successive drafts and revisions over the next two years, at least in part for different casts, completing the final chorus in October 1740. Further significant changes were made between 1740 and 1742.

The musicologist Winton Dean has described the composer's surviving autograph as incomplete, chaotic, and of 'baffling aspect', with some arias set multiple times, some not at all, recitatives with only words, or with only music, changes in voice parts, missing sections, and uncertainty as to the sequence of versions. The sources consist of material from three or four different versions composed for different casts, with additional major changes made after the first performance. Given the state of the surviving material, Dean comments that the lack of interest in the work over the years is not surprising. Friedrich Chrysander attempted a reconstruction in 1885, which Dean characterises as "leaving the opera in confusion"; Anthony Lewis's 1980 vocal score Dean considers practical, but mixes material from several versions; and it was not until 2002 that Donald Burrows's edition disentangled the versions.

With the benefit of Burrows' work, Dean characterises the opera as "a liitle masterpiece", the best of all Handel's late operas with the exception of Serse.

== Performance history ==
The opera received its first performance at the Lincoln's Inn Fields in London on 22 November 1740, billed as "An Operetta, call'd Hymen", with a second performance on 13 December. Opinions were mixed, with some in the audience expressing a preference for the oratorios which by that time were Handel's preferred musical form. Charles Jennens, Handel's librettist for the recently-completed oratorio Saul, described Imeneo as "the worst of all Handel’s Compositions", but added "yet half the Songs are good". Winton Dean's tart comment on that was "Jennens, who was deficient in humour, evidently disliked the tone of the opera."

After making radical revisions to the score, one result of which was to turn the piece from a wry comedy into a personal tragedy, Handel put on concert performances of "a new Serenata" in Dublin, on 24 and 31 March 1742.

The work was not revived until 1960, with the first modern production taking place at the Halle Opera House on 13 March, conducted by Horst-Tanu Margraf. Anthony Lewis directed his own arrangement in Birmingham in 1961; he also led the first London revival of the opera, in 1972 at the Royal Academy of Music.

Cambridge Handel Opera Company under the direction of Julian Perkins performed the opera at the former Festival Theatre in Cambridge in March 2026.

== Roles ==
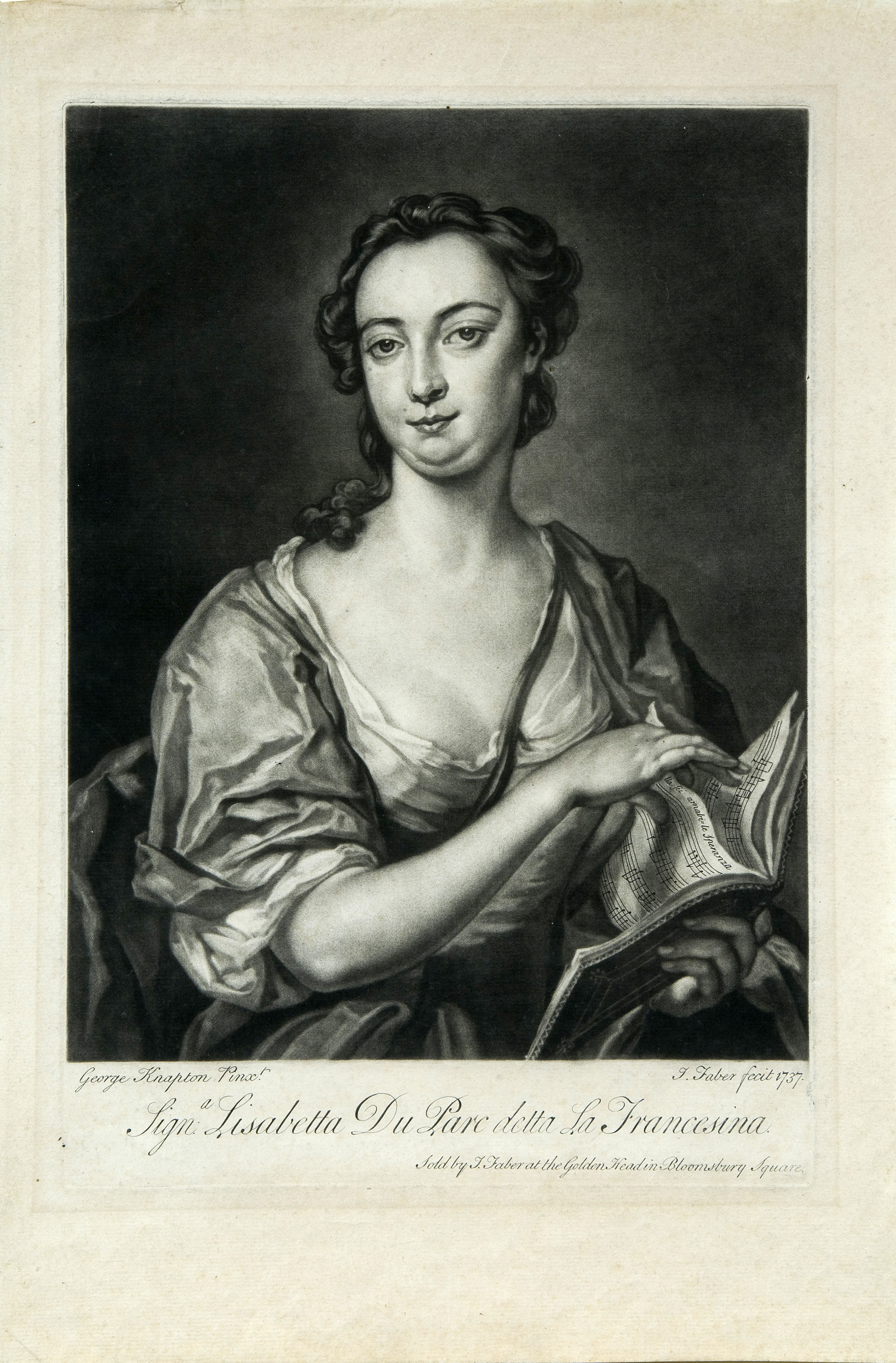
Élisabeth Duparc, who first sang the role of Rosmene

Roles, voice types, and premiere cast
Role	Voice type	Premiere Cast, 22 November 1740
Imeneo	bass	William Savage
Tirinto	mezzo-soprano castrato	Giovanni Battista Andreoni
Rosmene	soprano	Elisabeth Duparc ("La Francesina")
Clomiri	soprano	Miss Edwards
Argenio	bass	Henry Theodore Reinhold

== Recordings ==
Imeneo discography
Year	Cast: Tirinto, Imeneo, Rosmene, Clomiri, Argenio	Conductor, Orchestra	Label
1986	D'Anna Fortunato, John Ostendorf, Julianne Baird, Beverly Hoch, Jan Opalach	Rudolph Palmer, Brewer Chamber Orchestra	CD: Vox Records; Cat: CDX5135
2004	Ann Hallenberg, Kay Stiefermann, Johanna Stojkovic, Siri Thornhill, Locky Chung	Andreas Spering, Capella Augustina	CD: CPO Records; Cat: 9999152
2016	Ann Hallenberg, Magnus Staveland, Monica Piccinini, Cristiana Arcari, Fabrizio Beggi	Fabio Biondi, Europa Galante	CD: Glossa Records; Cat: GCD923405
