= Semele (Handel) =

1744 opera-oratorio by Handel

George Frideric Handel

Semele (HWV 58) is a "musical drama", originally presented "after the manner of an oratorio", in three parts by George Frideric Handel. Based on an existing opera libretto by William Congreve, the work is an opera in all but name but was first presented in concert form at Covent Garden theatre on 10 February 1744. The story comes from Ovid's Metamorphoses and concerns Semele, mother of Bacchus. Handel also referred to the work as "The Story of Semele". The work contains the famous aria "Where'er you walk".

The work fuses elements of opera, oratorio and classical drama, and is distinguished from Handel's operas by the large number of polyphonic choruses. Semele was presented during Lent, one of Handel's regular oratorio seasons, but was not the solemn work that London audiences were expecting during the Lenten season. Instead, it has a secular text revolving around an adulterous relationship: Jupiter, king of the gods, assumes human form and begins an affair with Semele, a young, vain, and ambitious mortal woman; Juno, Jupiter's wife, misleads Semele into a plot to attain immortality from Jupiter; when Semele sets the plot in motion by trying to gaze upon Jupiter in his godlike form, his lightning burns her to ash.

Semele was performed four times during its original run, and twice again later the same year, but those were the only performances in Handel's lifetime. Today, Semele is frequently fully staged and receives regular performances at many of the world's opera houses, as well as performances in concert form.

== Background ==
Interior, Theatre Royal Covent Garden where Semele was first performed

Handel's last Italian opera, Deidamia, was performed in 1741. After this time, he concentrated on oratorios and musical dramas with English texts. Many of these, including Semele, were premiered at the Covent Garden Theatre, beginning with Alexander's Feast in 1736 and finishing with The Triumph of Time and Truth in 1757. As a result, in the early 1740s, oratorios at the Covent Garden Theatre were Handel's chief activity. While most of these works had sacred or religious texts, two stand out for being secular: Hercules and Semele.

The libretto was written by William Congreve around 1705–6 and originally set to music in John Eccles's opera Semele. The text was adapted for Handel by an unknown collaborator, and he wrote the music in just over a month, from 3 June to 4 July 1743. Semele contains self-borrowings from Giulio Cesare and Fra pensieri qual pensiero (HWV 115), as well as borrowings from Alessandro Scarlatti (notably Il Pompeo), Porta, Reinhard Keiser, and Telemann. Noteworthy in the score are the number and quality of accompanied recitatives (a characteristic it shares with Il Pompeo), and the sheer variety of style and tempo markings (23, with nine unique in English works).

The musical drama takes a similar shape to an opera, but Handel eyed a place for it on the Covent Garden Theatre's oratorio-centred Lenten season of public concerts the following February (1744). So he fashioned Semele for presentation in the manner of an oratorio – a wolf in sheep's clothing to those not already enlightened to Ovid's Metamorphoses. His ploy to bring a powerful story to the theatre met, perhaps predictably, with mixed reactions. Mary Delany called it a "delightful piece of music", but commented, "Semele has a strong party against it, viz. the fine ladies, petit maitres, and ignoramuses. All the opera people are enraged at Handel." This probably related to the supporters of the rival Middlesex Opera Company, for which Handel would not write. Harsh criticism is also known from Messiah librettist Charles Jennens, who stated that it was "a baudy Opera".

The suggestion Semele was "profane" and so perhaps not suitable for respectable audiences caused the work to fall from the repertoire; it was revived only once by Handel.

However, Semele is still regarded as a work of high quality. As Lord Harewood put it:

the music of Semele is so full of variety, the recitative so expressive, the orchestration so inventive, the characterization so apt, the general level of invention so high, the action so full of credible situation and incident – in a word, the piece as a whole is so suited to the operatic stage – that one can only suppose its neglect to have been due to an act of abnegation on the part of opera companies, unless of course it is caused by sheer ignorance.

== Performance history ==
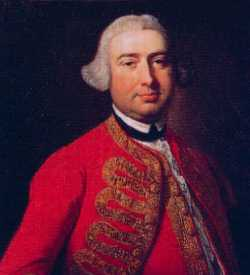
John Beard, who created the role of Jupiter

Semele was first performed on 10 February 1744 at the Covent Garden Theatre, London, as part of a concert series held yearly during Lent. The audience naturally expected Bible-based subject matter; but the amorous topic of Semele, which is a creation of the late Restoration Period, transparently drew on Greek myths, and thus displeased those who were attending for a different kind of uplift. Being in English, Semele likewise irritated the supporters of true Italian opera, particularly as Handel would also not write for the rival Middlesex Opera Company. Winton Dean writes in his book Handel's Dramatic Oratorios:

The public [in 1744] found [Semele's] tone too close to that of the discredited Italian opera and set it down as an oratorio manqué; where they expected wholesome Lenten bread, they received a glittering stone dug from the ruins of Greek mythology.

As a result, only four performances took place. The cast at the première included Elisabeth Duparc ('La Francesina') in the title role, Esther Young as Juno (and Ino), and John Beard as Jupiter. Henry Reinhold sang the bass roles. Handel seems to have interchanged some of the music between singers.

Later, on 1 and 8 December 1744, Handel presented a revised version, this time at the King's Theatre, after cutting four sections of dialogue containing sexual innuendo and making additions that included interspersed arias in Italian (for the opera crowd) from Arminio and Giustino.

=== 20th century ===
Semele fell into prolonged neglect until its first stage performances, in Cambridge, England, in 1925 and in London in 1954. These fuelled an enthusiasm for the work that has not since lapsed.

Semele was staged on four occasions (1959, 1961, 1964 and 1975) by the Handel Opera Society under Charles Farncombe, and it entered the repertory of the Sadler's Wells Opera (now English National Opera) in 1970. The opera returned in 1982—after a 238-year hiatus—to Covent Garden (the Royal Opera House), with Valerie Masterson in the title role and conducted, as at Sadler's Wells, by Charles Mackerras.

The American stage première took place at the Ravinia Festival near Chicago in 1959. Semele was performed in Washington, DC, in 1980, and at Carnegie Hall, New York, in 1985, on the latter occasion with Kathleen Battle in the title role and John Nelson conducting. (A recording with a similar cast was made in 1990 and issued on the Deutsche Grammophon label.)

In 1999, Semele returned to the English National Opera in London in a highly regarded production by Robert Carsen with Harry Bicket conducting, featuring Rosemary Joshua as Semele, John Mark Ainsley as Jupiter, Susan Bickley as Juno, Sarah Connolly as Ino, and Janis Kelly as Iris. The production was revived in 2004 with Carolyn Sampson (Semele), Ian Bostridge (Jupiter) and Patricia Bardon (Juno).

=== 21st century ===
Pinchgut Opera staged a production in 2002 in the City Recital Hall, Sydney, conducted by Antony Walker and directed by Justin Way. There is a recording of this production.

In 2004 a staged production directed by David McVicar and conducted by Marc Minkowski opened at the Théâtre des Champs-Élysées in Paris. (This was revived in 2010 by conductor Christophe Rousset.)

A new production opened at New York City Opera on 13 September 2006. Directed by Stephen Lawless, it made metaphorical references to Marilyn Monroe, U.S. presidents John F. Kennedy, Bill Clinton, and George W. Bush, and Jacqueline Kennedy. Elizabeth Futral sang Semele, Vivica Genaux portrayed Juno (and Ino), and Robert Breault sang Jupiter.

In 2007, Zürich Opera in Switzerland mounted Robert Carsen's 1999 production of Semele as a vehicle for Cecilia Bartoli, with Birgit Remmert and Charles Workman as Juno and Jupiter and William Christie conducting. This staging was taped, issued as a Decca DVD, and successfully transferred (in 2010) to Vienna's Theater an der Wien.

In September of the same year a new staging by the Chinese artist Zhang Huan, conducted by Rousset, with Les Talens Lyriques, opened at La Monnaie in Brussels. This moved on 24 October 2010 to Beijing's Poly Theater as part of the Beijing Music Festival—the first major production of a baroque opera in the People's Republic of China. In May 2012 this production moved to the Canadian Opera Company, and while Jane Archibald received high praise for her performance in the title role, the production received generally poor reviews overall for having excised Handel's finale and haphazardly introducing Buddhist themes incongruent to the source material.

Among numerous performances worldwide, the piece received a production as a fully staged opera at Opera Philadelphia in 2019 and at the Royal Opera by Oliver Mears in 2025.

== Roles ==
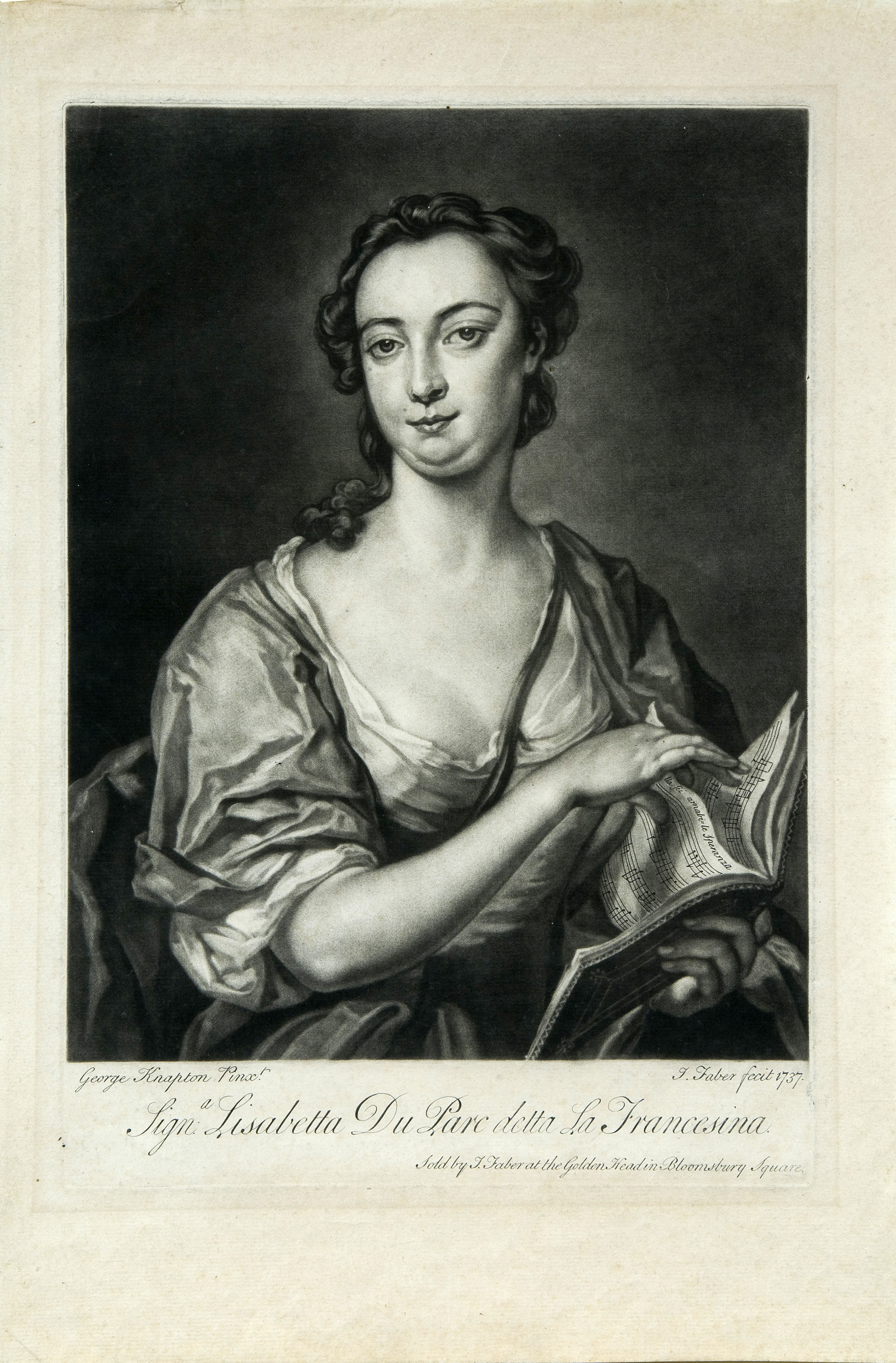
Èlisabeth Duparc, called "La Francesina", who created the role of Semele

Roles, voice types, and premiere cast
| Role | Voice type | Premiere cast, 10 February 1744 Conductor: G. F. Handel |
|---|---|---|
| Jupiter | tenor | John Beard |
| Cadmus, King of Thebes | bass | Henry Reinhold |
| Semele, daughter to Cadmus, in love with Jupiter | soprano | Élisabeth Duparc ("La Francesina") |
| Athamas, a prince of Bœotia, in love with, and designed to marry Semele | alto | Daniel Sullivan (countertenor) |
| Ino, sister to Semele, in love with Athamas | mezzo-soprano | Esther Young |
| Somnus | bass | Henry Reinhold |
| Apollo | tenor | John Beard |
| Juno | mezzo-soprano | Esther Young |
| Iris | soprano | Christina Maria Avoglio |
| High priest | bass | Henry Reinhold |
Chorus of priests, augurs, loves, zephyrs, nymphs, swains and attendants

== Synopsis ==
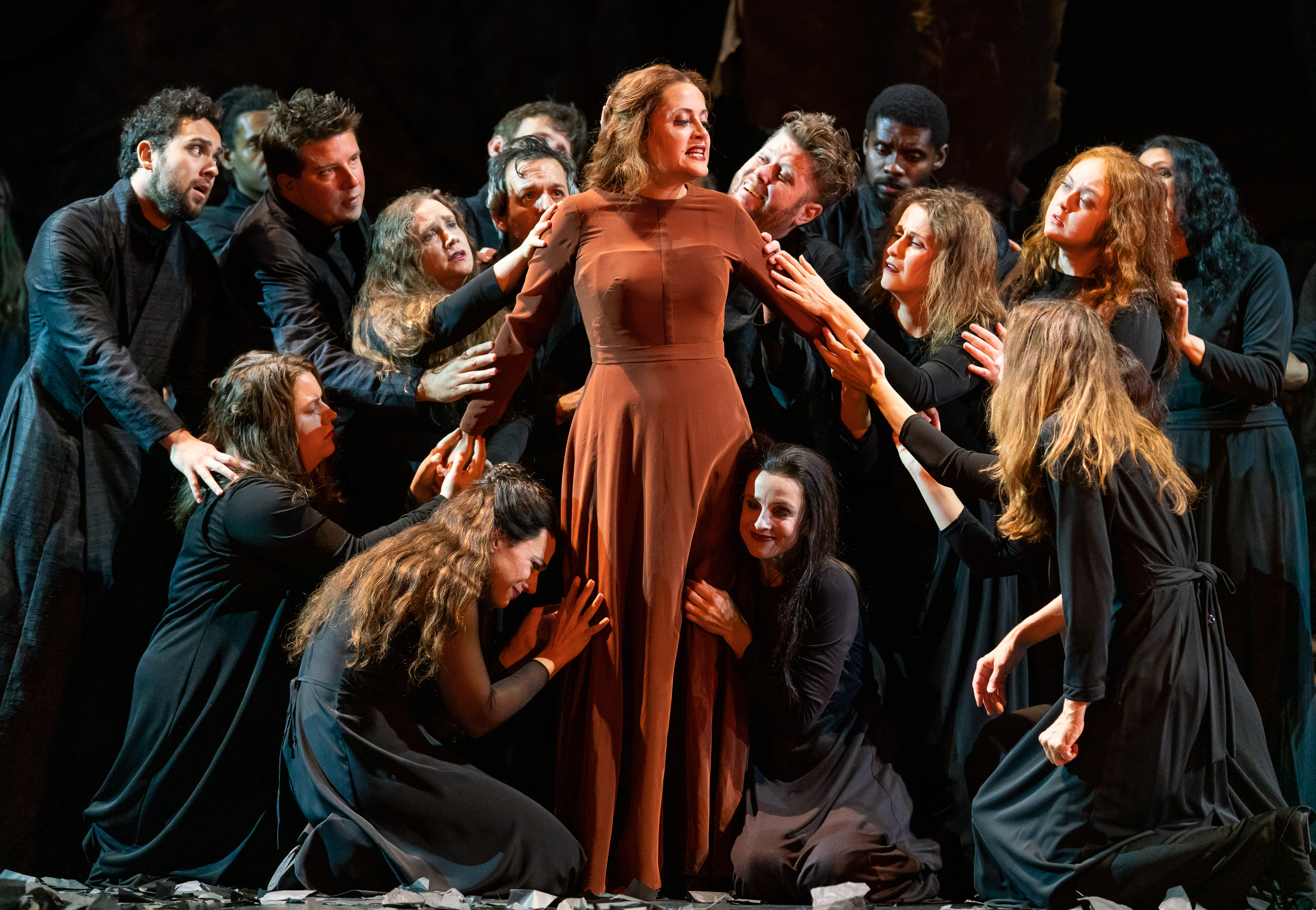
Scene from a production by Opera Philadelphia, 2019

Precis:

Jupiter, king of the gods, takes the mortal Princess Semele to a secret hiding place on a mountain to be his mistress. When Jupiter's wife, Juno, hears of her husband's adultery she is enraged, and plots to ensure Semele's downfall. In disguise, Juno appeals to the girl's vanity and persuades her to insist on seeing her lover in his divine form. Jupiter reluctantly agrees but his thunderbolts burn and consume Semele. From her ashes, though, arise her unborn child by Jupiter—Bacchus, god of wine and ecstasy.

=== Act 1 ===
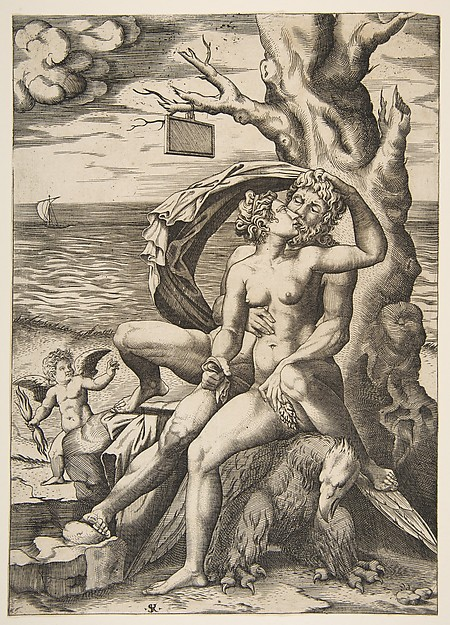
Zeus and Semele embracing, 18th century engraving

Scene: Greece, in legendary antiquity

The scene is the temple of Juno. Near the altar is a golden image of the goddess

In the temple of Juno, Cadmus, King of Thebes, is preparing for the marriage of his daughter Semele to Athamas, Prince of Boeotia. Signs from the goddess indicate she approves of the match (accompanied recitative: "Behold! Auspicious flashes rise" and chorus: "Lucky omens bless our rites"). However, the bride has been inventing one excuse after the other to put off the wedding and her father and would-be bridegroom urge her to hesitate no longer (duet: "Daughter, hear! Hear and obey!"). To herself, Semele reflects on her dilemma—she does not wish to marry Prince Athamas as she is in love with Jove himself and calls on him to assist her (accompanied recitative: "Ah me! What refuge now is left me?", arioso: "O Jove! In pity teach me which to choose" and aria: "The morning lark"). Athamas, observing her, takes her physical signs of emotional upheaval as evidence she is in love with him (aria: "Hymen, haste, thy torch prepare"). Ino, Semele's sister, now appears, also in a state of distress as she is in love with Athamas (quartet: "Why dost thou thus untimely grieve?") Jupiter has heard Semele's prayer and his thunderbolts interrupt the proceedings and alarm the observers (chorus: "Avert these omens, all ye pow'rs"). The priests of Juno order the wedding abandoned and everyone to leave the temple (chorus: "Cease, cease your vows"), which all do except for Athamas, in despair at his wedding being cancelled, and Ino, hopelessly in love with him (aria: "Turn, hopeless lover"). Athamas can see she is upset, without guessing why, and he can feel for her in her distress because he is upset too (aria: "Your tuneful voice my tale would tell"). Athamas is astonished when she tells him bluntly that she loves him (duet: "You've undone me"). Cadmus interrupts their confusion and describes the extraordinary event he has just witnessed: as they fled the temple Semele was suddenly carried off by an eagle (accompanied recitative: "Wing'd with our fears"). The priests and augurs identify this eagle as Jupiter himself (chorus: "Hail Cadmus, hail!"). As the act ends, Semele is seen enjoying her role as the god's new mistress (aria: "Endless pleasure, endless love").

=== Act 2 ===
Scene One

A pleasant country, the prospect terminated by a beautiful mountain adorn'd with woods and waterfalls. Juno and Iris descend in different machines. Juno in a chariot drawn by peacocks; Iris on a rainbow; they alight and meet.

Juno, suspicious of her husband's conduct, has sent her helper Iris to find out what she can. Iris reports that Jove has installed Semele as his mistress in a palace atop a mountain (aria: "There, from mortal cares retiring"). The outraged Juno swears to have revenge (accompanied recitative: "Awake, Saturnia, from thy lethargy!"). Iris warns her it will not be an easy task—the palace is guarded by dragons that never sleep (accompanied recitative: "With adamant the gates are barr'd"). Juno decides that she and Iris will pay a visit to the god of sleep in his cave, in order to get magical assistance to put the dragons to sleep (aria: "Hence, Iris, hence away").

Scene Two

An apartment in the palace of Semele. She is sleeping, Loves and Zephyrs waiting.

Semele awakes and regrets that the dream she was having of being with her lover has ended (aria: "O sleep, why dost thou leave me?"). When Jupiter enters, in the form of a young man, she tells him how difficult it is for her when he is absent. He explains that she is a mortal, unlike him, and needs to rest from their love-making from time to time. He attempts to assure her of his fidelity (aria: "Lay your doubts and fears aside"). Semele sings of her passionate love for him (aria: "With fond desiring"). The chorus of Loves and Zephyrs sing of lovers' joys (chorus: "How engaging, how endearing"). Semele, however, is beginning to be unhappy that her lover is a god and she a mere mortal. This sign of an ambition to immortality from Semele worries Jupiter who decides he must distract her from such thoughts (aria: "I must with speed amuse her"). The Loves and Zephyrs advise Semele to put aside worries and enjoy the delights of love while she can (chorus: "Now Love that everlasting boy invites"). Jupiter has arranged for Semele's sister Ino to be magically transported to the palace, to keep her company, and promises that the gardens and environs will be paradise (aria: "Where'er you walk"). He leaves, and Ino appears, describing the wondrous experience of being flown there by winged zephyrs (aria: "But hark, the heav'nly sphere turns round"). The sisters sing of the joy they are experiencing, hearing the music of the spheres (duet: "Prepare then, ye immortal choir") and nymphs and swains declare that this part of the earth has become a heaven (chorus: "Bless the glad earth").

=== Act 3 ===
Scene One

The Cave of Sleep. The God of Sleep lying on his bed.

Juno and Iris arrive and wake Somnus (accompanied recitative: "Somnus, awake"), to his displeasure (aria: "Leave me, loathsome light"). He only gets out of bed when he hears Juno mention the beautiful nymph Pasithea (aria: "More sweet is that name"). Juno promises he will have the nymph if he will lend her magical aid to put to sleep the dragons that guard the palace where Semele is ensconced as her husband's mistress and transform her into the likeness of Semele's sister Ino. Somnus agrees (duet: "Obey my will").

Scene Two

An Apartment. Semele alone

Semele is still feeling rather unhappy about the discrepancy between herself and her lover (aria: "My racking thoughts"). Juno, in the form of Semele's sister Ino, enters and feigns astonishment at Semele's increased beauty. She exclaims that Semele must have become a goddess herself and gives her a mirror ("Behold in this mirror"). Semele is enraptured by her own beauty (aria: "Myself I shall adore"). "Ino" advises Semele to insist that Jupiter appear to her in his real, godlike form, and that will make her immortal herself (accompanied recitative: "Conjure him by his oath"). Semele is very grateful for this advice (aria: "Thus let my thanks be paid"). "Ino" leaves and Jupiter enters, eager to enjoy Semele (aria: "Come to my arms, my lovely fair") but she puts him off (aria: "I ever am granting"). He swears to give her whatever she desires (accompanied recitative: "By that tremendous flood, I swear") and she makes him promise to appear to her in his godlike form (accompanied recitative: "Then cast off this human shape"). He is alarmed and says that would harm her (aria: "Ah, take heed what you press"), but she insists he keep his oath (aria: "No, no, I'll take no less") and leaves. Jupiter knows this will mean her destruction and mourns her impending doom (accompanied recitative: "Ah, whither is she gone"). Juno triumphs in the success of her scheme (aria: "Above measure is the pleasure").

Scene Three

The scene discovers Semele under a canopy, leaning pensively, while a mournful symphony is playing. She looks up and sees Jupiter descending in a cloud; flashes of lightning issue from either side, and thunder is heard grumbling in the air.

Semele, granted her wish to see Jupiter in his true godlike form, is consumed by his thunderbolts, and as she dies she regrets her own foolishness and ambition (accompanied recitative: "Ah me! Too late I now repent"). Watching this, the priests of Juno express their amazement (chorus: "Oh, terror and astonishment!"). Athamas is now glad to accept Ino as his bride (aria: "Despair no more shall wound me"). The god Apollo descends on a cloud and announces that the unborn child of Semele and Jupiter will arise from her ashes (accompanied recitative: "Apollo comes, to relieve your care"). The child will be Bacchus, god of wine and ecstasy, a god "more mighty than love". All celebrate the fortunate outcome (chorus: "Happy, happy shall we be").

== Musical features ==
The pleasure-loving and vain Semele is aptly characterised through Handel's music. The work contains one of Handel's most famous arias, the lyrical "Where'er you walk" for the tenor, with words from Alexander Pope's The Pastorals. Comedy is interwoven into the drama, notably in the scene in the cave of the god of sleep. The monumental chorus "O terror! and astonishment" after Semele's death shows the influence of the earlier English composer Henry Purcell.

== Recordings ==
=== Audio recordings ===
Semele discography, audio recordings
| Year | Cast: Semele, Jove, Juno, Cadmus, Athamas, Ino, Somnus | Conductor, orchestra and chorus | Label | Running time |
|---|---|---|---|---|
| 1955 | Jennifer Vyvyan, William Herbert, Anna Pollack, George Pragnell, John Whitworth, Helen Watts, George James | Anthony Lewis, New Symphony Orchestra, Saint Anthony Singers | LP: L'Oiseau-Lyre; Cat: OLS 111–3 | 137:25 |
| 1973 | Sheila Armstrong, Robert Tear, Helen Watts, Justino Díaz, Mark Deller, Helen Watts, Justino Diaz | Johannes Somary, English Chamber Orchestra, Amor Artis Chorale | CD: Vanguard Classics; Cat: 885082 | 144:27 |
| 1982 | Norma Burrowes, Patrizia Kwella, Elisabeth Priday, Anthony Rolfe Johnson, Della Jones, Robert Lloyd, Timothy Penrose, Catherine Denley, David Thomas | John Eliot Gardiner, English Baroque Soloists, Monteverdi Choir | CD: Erato; Cat: 2292-45982-2 | 154:00 |
| 1990 | Kathleen Battle, John Aler, Marilyn Horne, Samuel Ramey, Michael Chance, Marilyn Horne, Samuel Ramey | John Nelson, English Chamber Orchestra, Ambrosian Opera Chorus | CD: Deutsche Grammophon; Cat: 435 782–2 | 170:19 |
| 2002 | Anna Ryberg, Angus Wood, Sally-Anne Russell, Stephen Bennett, Tobias Cole, Sally-Anne Russell, Stephen Bennett | Antony Walker, Cantillation, Sirius Ensemble | CD: ABC Classics; Cat: 980 047-0 | |
| 2004 | Danielle de Niese, Paul Agnew, Guillemette Laurens, Jonathan May, Sébastien Fournier, Louise Innes, Jonathan May | David Stern, Opera Fuoco | CD: Pierre Verany; Cat: PV704021/22 | |
| 2007 | Rosemary Joshua, Richard Croft, Hilary Summers, Brindley Sherratt, Stephen Wallace, Hilary Summers, Stephen Wallace | Christian Curnyn, Early Opera Company | CD: Chandos; Cat: CHANO 745 | |
| 2020 | Louise Alder, Hugo Hymas, Lucile Richardot, Gianluca Buratto, Carlo Vistoli, Lucile Richardot, Gianluca Buratto | John Eliot Gardiner, English Baroque Soloists, Monteverdi Choir | CD:SDG; Cat:SDG733 | 155:00 |
| 2021 | Ana Maria Labin, Matthew Newlin, Andreas Wolf, Lawrence Zazzo, Dara Savinoya, Gwendoline Blondeel, Chiara Skerath | Leonardo García Alarcón, Choeur de Chambre de Namur, Millenium Orchestra | CD: Ricercar; Cat: RIC437 | 169:00 |

=== Video recording ===
Semele discography, video recordings
| Year | Cast: Semele, Jove, Juno, Cadmus, Athamas, Ino, Somnus | Conductor, opera house and orchestra | Label |
|---|---|---|---|
| 2007 | Cecilia Bartoli, Charles Workman, Birgit Remmert, Anton Scharinger, Thomas Michael Allen, Liliana Nikiteanu, Anton Scharinger | William Christie, Opernhaus Zürich; Orchestra La Scintilla | DVD: Decca; Cat: 0743323 |
