= Samson (Handel) =

Oratorio by George Frideric Handel

- Oratorio by George Frideric Handel
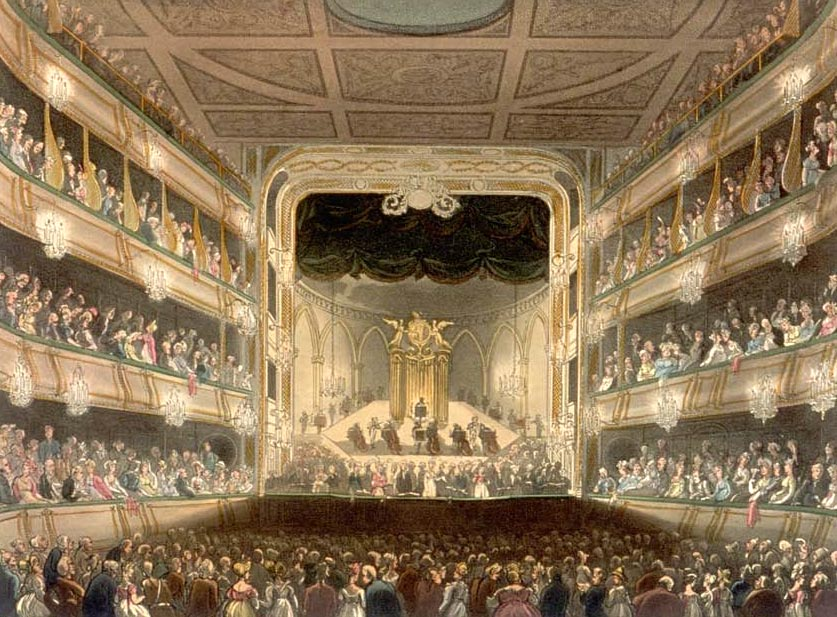
- Theatre at Covent Garden where Samson was first performed
- Period: Baroque period
- Language: English
- Composed: 1743
- Duration: about 2 hours and 30 minutes

Premiere
- Date: 18 February 1743
- Location: Covent Garden in London
- Performers: John Beard tenor Catherine Clive soprano Susannah Maria Cibber contralto William Savage bass Henry Reinhold bass Christina Maria Avoglio soprano Thomas Lowe tenor

Samson (HWV 57) is a three-act oratorio from 1743 by George Frideric Handel, considered to be one of his finest dramatic works. It is usually performed as an oratorio in concert form, but on occasions has also been staged as an opera. The well-known arias "Let the bright Seraphim" (for soprano), "Total eclipse" (for tenor) and "Let their celestial concerts" (the final chorus) are often performed separately in concert.

== Composition ==
Handel began the composition of Samson immediately after completing Messiah on 14 September 1741. It used a libretto by Newburgh Hamilton, based on Milton's Samson Agonistes, which in turn was based on the figure Samson in Chapter 16 of the Book of Judges. Handel completed the first act on 20 September 1741, the second act on 11 October that year, and the whole work on 29 October. Shortly after that he travelled to Dublin to premiere Messiah, returning to London at the end of August 1742 and thoroughly revising Samson.

The premiere was given at Covent Garden in London on 18 February 1743. The incidental organ music probably came from his recently completed concerto in A major (HWV 307). The oratorio was a great success, leading to a total of seven performances in its first season, the most in a single season of any of his oratorios. Samson retained its popularity throughout Handel's lifetime and has never fallen entirely out of favor.

== Premiere cast ==
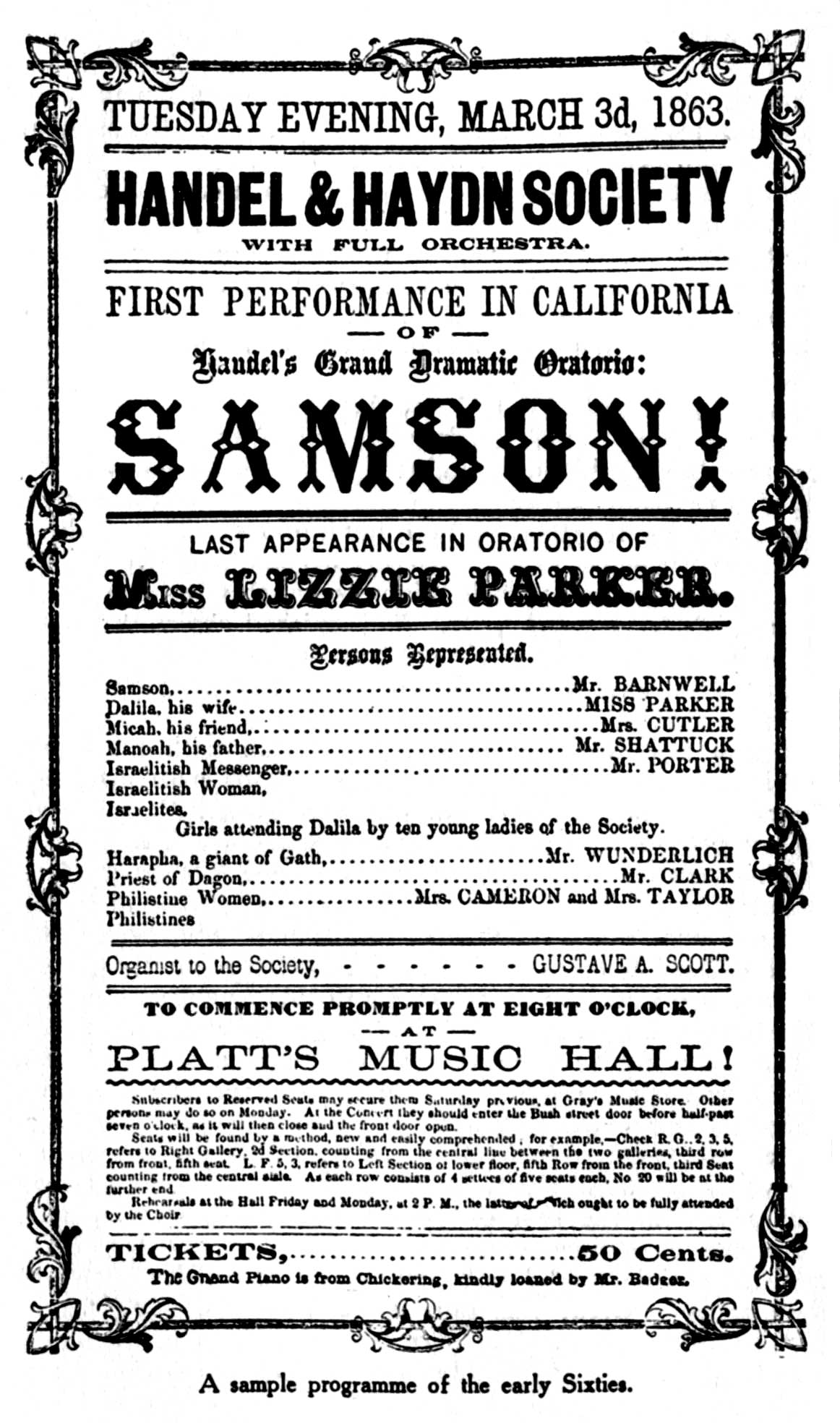
Poster for an early American performance of Samson

Roles, voice types, and premiere cast
Role	Voice	Premiere cast
Samson	tenor	John Beard
Dalila, Wife of Samson	soprano	Catherine Clive
Micah, Friend to Samson	contralto	Susannah Maria Cibber
Manoah, Father to Samson	bass	William Savage
Harapha, a Giant	bass	Henry Reinhold
Philistine Woman, Attendant to Dalila	soprano	Miss Edwards
Israelitish Woman	soprano	Christina Maria Avoglio
Philistine	tenor	Thomas Lowe
Israelitish Man	tenor	Thomas Lowe
Messenger	tenor	
Chorus of Israelites		
Chorus of Philistines		
Chorus of Virgins		

== Synopsis ==
Samson, Judge of Israel, married a Philistine woman, Delilah, who discovered that he derived his supernatural strength from never cutting his hair. Delilah shaved his hair while he was sleeping and betrayed him to her people, the Philistines, enemy of the Israelites. The Philistines captured Samson and put his eyes out. The scene was set in front of the prison in Gaza. Since it was a festival day in honour of the Philistine god Dagon Samson was allowed to come out of his prison cell, albeit in chains, and received visitors.

=== Act 1 ===
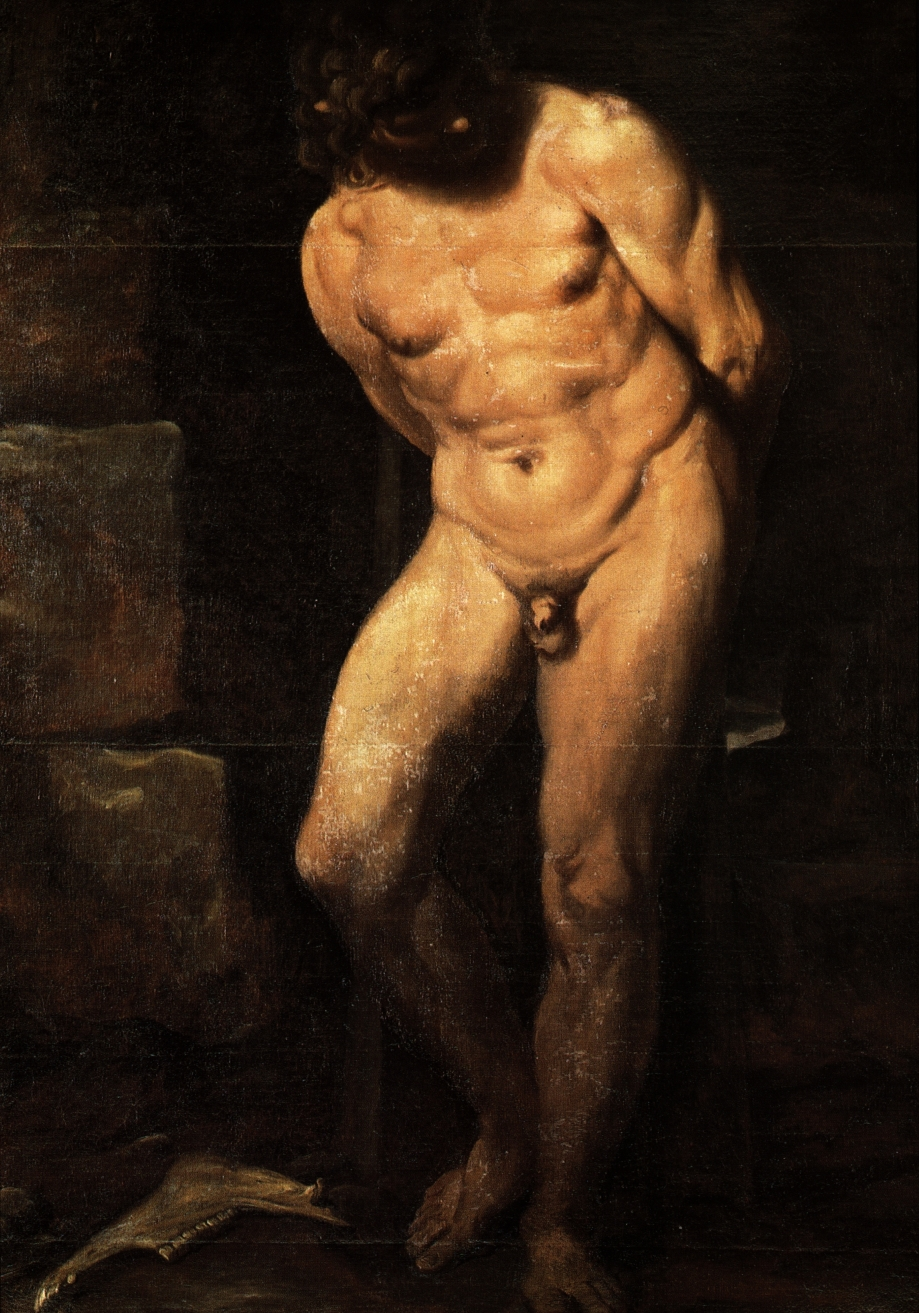
Samson Imprisoned, by Annibale Carracci

The Philistines celebrate the festival in honour of their god as Samson, blind and in chains, bewails his fate. Samson's friend Micah, allowed to visit on this special day, is appalled by how low their once invincible hero has fallen, seeing Samson's humiliation as a symbol of Israel's defeat, but Samson insists it is all his own fault for having been unable to keep the secret of his magical strength from the woman who betrayed him. Samson bitterly laments his loss of sight.

Samson's father Manoah finds Samson and is shocked by his transformation. Samson longs for death but is comforted by the Chorus of the Israelites that he will triumph over death and time.

=== Act 2 ===
Micah and the Israelites implore divine assistance as Samson still wishes to die. Delilah, with a group of young women, appears and tells Samson she is sorry for what she did and that she did not realise how serious the consequences would be. She attempts to convince him that she still loves him, but he angrily repudiates her.

The Philistine Harapha comes to insult Samson, who challenges him to a duel. Harapha, however, reviles Samson, claiming it is beneath his dignity to fight with a blind man. Samson mocks him as a braggart. Micah proposes to measure the power of Dagon against that of the God of the Israelites. The Israelite and Philistine choruses both praise their God.

=== Act 3 ===
Harapha arrives to take Samson to the feast of the Philistines and show him off there. Samson at first refuses to be present at the worship of Dagon, but then thinks of a plan and agrees to go to the festival, though he warns the Israelites to stay away from it.

Manoah arrives with plans for the children of Israel, including how to free Samson. From a distance the songs of the Philistines are heard, calling on Dagon. Suddenly these sounds turn to noise and panic.

An Israelite messenger arrives and tells the Israelites what has happened: Samson pulled down the building on himself and the Philistines. Samson's dead body is brought out to a funeral march and the children of Israel lament his death. The work ends on a note of thanksgiving as the Israelites praise their God.

== Background ==
The German-born Handel was resident in London since 1712 where he enjoyed great success as a composer of Italian operas. His opportunities to set English texts to music were more limited. He spent the years 1717 to 1719 as composer in residence to the wealthy Duke of Chandos, where he wrote church anthems and two stage works, Acis and Galatea and Esther. He composed vocal music to English words for various royal occasions, including a set of Coronation anthems for George II in 1727, which made a huge impact. In 1731, a performance of the 1718 version of Esther, a work in English based on a Biblical drama by Jean Racine, was given in London without Handel's participation and proved to be popular. He thus revised the work and planned to present it at the theatre where his Italian operas were being presented. However, the Bishop of London would not permit a drama based on a Biblical story to be acted out on the stage; Handel therefore presented Esther in concert form, thus giving birth to the English oratorio.

Esther in its revised form proved to be a popular work, and Handel, though still continuing to focus on composing Italian operas, followed up with two more sacred dramas with English words presented in concert form, Deborah, and Athalia (which, like Esther, was also based on a Biblical drama by Racine), both in 1733. Such was the success of his oratorios in English that Handel eventually abandoned Italian opera, with his last being Deidamia in 1741 and a string of masterpieces of oratorio in English.

== Musical features ==
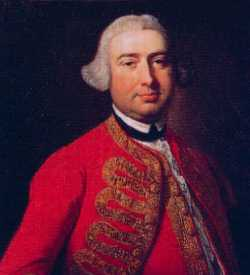
John Beard, who played the role of Samson

Samson is richly orchestrated by the standards of its day, calling for strings, two oboes, two bassoons, two horns, two flutes, two trumpets, timpani and continuo instruments. Handel's characterisation through music is evidenced throughout the work, not only in the music for soloists such as Delilah's would-be seductive aria with alluring violins or in the swagger of Harapha's music, but also in the choruses, with the solemn gravity of the Israelites' music sharply contrasted with the hedonistic carefree choruses with added horns for the Philistines.

== Later uses ==
The aria "Let the Bright Seraphim" was sung by Kiri Te Kanawa during the wedding of Prince Charles and Lady Diana Spencer.

== Recordings ==
Samson discography
Year	Cast: Samson, Delilah, Micah, Harapha, Manoah, A maiden, A messenger	Conductor, Orchestra and chorus	Label
1962	Jan Peerce, Phyllis Curtin, Louise Parker, Malcolm Smith, Roy Samuelsen, Jean Preston, Kenly Whitelock	Maurice Abravanel, Utah Symphony Orchestra (Dr. Alexander Schreiner, organ, harpsichord), University of Utah Symphonic Chorale (Dr. Newell B. Weight, director)	CD: Vanguard Classics; Cat: SVC-131-32
1968	Alexander Young, Martina Arroyo, Norma Procter, Ezio Flagello, Thomas Stewart, Helen Donath, Jerry J. Jennings	Karl Richter, Münchener Bach-Orchester, Münchener Bach-Chor	Archiv; CD: 453245
1978	Robert Tear, Janet Baker, Helen Watts, Benjamin Luxon, John Shirley-Quirk	Raymond Leppard, English Chamber Orchestra, London Voices (Terry Edwards, dir.)	Erato; LP: STU 71240
1992	Anthony Rolfe Johnson, Roberta Alexander, Jochen Kowalski, Alastair Miles, Anton Scharinger	Nikolaus Harnoncourt, Concentus musicus Wien and Arnold Schoenberg Chor	CD: Teldec, Das Alte Werk
1996	Thomas Randle, Lynda Russell, Catherine Wyn-Rogers, Jonathan Best, Michael George, Lynne Dawson, Matthew Vine	Harry Christophers, The Symphony of Harmony and Invention, The Sixteen	CD:Coro Cat: COR16008
2019	Joshua Ellicott, Sophie Bevan, Jess Dandy, Vitali Rozynko, Matthew Brook, Mary Bevan, Hugo Hymas	John Butt, Dunedin Consort, Tiffin Boys' Choir	CD:Linn Records; Cat:CKD599
2020	Matthew Newlin, Klara Ek, Lawrence Zazzo, Luigi Di Donato, Julie Roset, Maxime Melnik	Leonardo García Alarcón, Millenium Orchestra, Chœur de chambre de Namur	CD:Ricercar Records, Cat:RIC411

== Bibliography ==
- Winton Dean: Handel's Dramatic Oratorios and Masques. Clarendon, Oxford 1989, ISBN 0-19-816184-0, (Originalausgabe: Oxford University Press, Oxford 1959)
- (in German) Hans Joachim Marx: Händels Oratorien, Oden und Serenaten. Ein Kompendium. Vandenhoeck & Ruprecht, Göttingen 1998, ISBN 3-525-27815-2.
- (in German) Albert Scheibler, Julia Evdokimova: Georg Friedrich Händel. Oratorien-Führer. Edition Köln, Lohmar 1993, ISBN 3-928010-04-2.
