= Birgit Remmert =

German opera singer (born 1966)

- Born: 4 September 1966 (age 58); Braunschweig, Germany
- Education: Hochschule für Musik Detmold
- Occupation(s): Operatic mezzo-soprano and contralto
- Organizations: Opernhaus Zürich

Birgit Remmert (born 4 September 1966) is a German operatic mezzo-soprano and contralto who has appeared in major European opera houses, concert halls and festivals. She has performed title roles such as Dalila, Penthesilea, and Iokaste in an opera composed for her.

== Career ==
Born in Braunschweig, Remmert took voice lessons from age 17. She studied at the Hochschule für Musik Detmold with Helmut Kretschmar. As a student, she achieved several prizes at international competitions.

Remmert was from 1992 to 1998 a member of the ensemble of the Opernhaus Zürich, where she appeared as Farnace in Mozart's Mitridate, re di Ponto, as Ulrica in Verdi's Un ballo in maschera, as Mrs. Quickly in his Falstaff, in the title role of Samson et Dalila by Saint-Saëns, as Suzuki in Puccini's Madama Butterfly, as Zita in his Gianni Schicchi, and as Orlofski in Die Fledermaus by Johann Strauss, among others.

She performed at the Salzburg Festival the role of the Nutrice in Monteverdi's L'incoronazione di Poppea in 1993, in Purcell's King Arthur in 2004, and as Ježibaba in Dvořák's Rusalka in 2008. She appeared in Europe, at the Festival Montpellier in 1998, singing the title role of Schoeck's Penthesilea in a concert version, at the Bayreuth Festival in 2000 and 2001 in the role of Fricka in Wagner's Der Ring des Nibelungen, at the Semperoper in Dresden where she was Fricka, Erda and Waltraute in the Ring Cycle of 2001 to 2004, at the Teatro Real Madrid as Ortrud in his Lohengrin in 2005), and at La Fenice in Venice as Gaea in Daphne by Richard Strauss the same year.

In Zurich, she appeared as Juno in a new production of Handel's Semele in 2009. The same year, she was the Nurse in Die Frau ohne Schatten by Richard Straussstaged by David Pountney and conducted by Franz Welser-Möst. Composer Stefan Heucke wrote an opera for her, Iokaste, which premiered at the Ruhrfestspiele in June 2014. The only character, Iocaste, mother and wife of Oedipus, is portrayed by an actress and a singer, to present Iocaste's view on the tragic development as an inner monologue.

== Awards ==
- 1989 Scholarship of the Bayreuth Festival
- 1990 First prize Concorso Internazionale di Musica Camera, Finale Ligure, Italy
- 1991 Prize of the Deutscher Musikrat at the Deutscher Musikwettbewerb
- 2007 ECHO Klassik for the recording of Christus by Franz Liszt
