= Simone Kermes =

German coloratura soprano (born 1965)

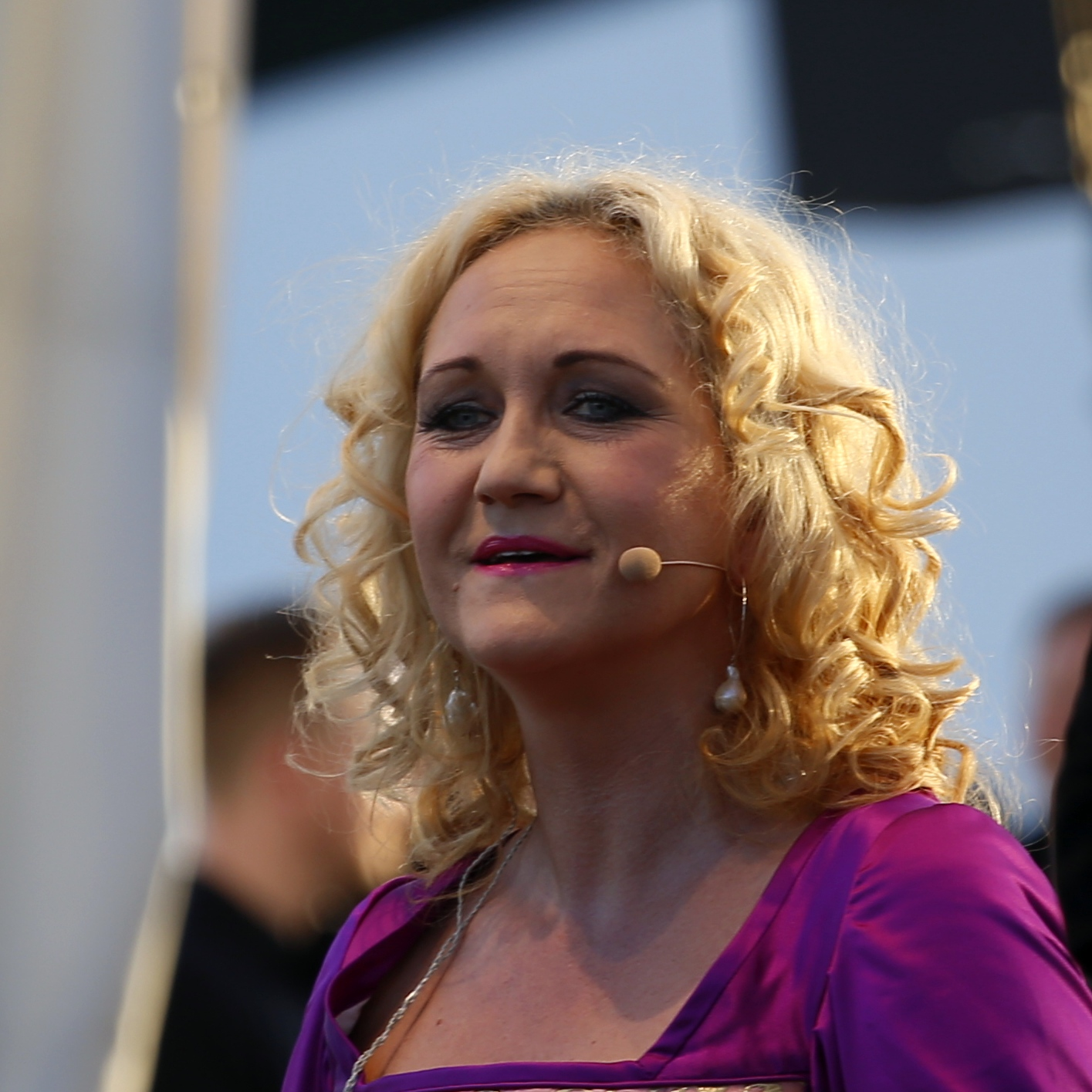
- Born: Simone Kermes; March 17, 1965 (age 61); Leipzig, Germany
- Education: University of Music and Theatre Leipzig
- Website: simone-kermes.de

Simone Kermes (born 17 May 1965, in Leipzig) is a German coloratura soprano, especially known for her virtuoso voice, suited to the opera seria genre of the Baroque and early Classical period.

== Career ==
Kermes has performed at many important theatres and concert halls internationally, including the Brooklyn Academy of Music in New York, the Théâtre des Champs-Élysées in Paris, the Staatsoper Stuttgart, the Bonn Opera, the Festspielhaus Baden-Baden. She has appeared at festivals such as Schwetzingen Festival, Schleswig-Holstein Musik Festival, Rheingau Musik Festival, Festa de musica Lisbona, Ruhrtriennale arts festival, Triennale di Colonia, Dresden MDR, Prague Autumn, Bachfest Leipzig, Bachfest Bonn, and Resonanzen Vienna. She has also performed with notable orchestras, including Gewandhaus Orchestra, Symphonic Orchestra of Prague, Venice Baroque Orchestra, Classical Orchestra of Madrid, Staatskapelle Dresden, Orchestra of the Comunale of Bologna, Orchestra regionale Toscana, Complesso Barocco, and Orchestra of the Fiandre.

On the opera stage she has portrayed numerous Handel heroines, including Adelaide in Lotario, Asteria in Tamerlano, Merab in Saul, and the title roles in Alcina, Deidamia, and Rodelinda. She appeared in Mozart operas, as Konstanze in Die Entführung aus dem Serail, Fiordiligi in Così fan tutte and Donna Anna in Don Giovanni. Her roles have included Laodice in Scarlatti's Mitridate Eupatore, Rosalinde in Die Fledermaus by Johann Strauss, and the title role in Peri's Euridice. In 2000 she performed the role of Cinzia in the first modern revival of Giovanni Legrenzi's La divisione del mondo at the Schwetzingen Festival. In 2014 she sang the role of La Folie in Rameau's Platée at the Theater an der Wien and at the Lincoln Center in New York.

== Awards ==
- 1993: 1st prize of the Felix-Mendelssohn-Bartholdy-Wettbewerb Berlin
- 1996: 3rd prize at the Internationaler Johann-Sebastian-Bach-Wettbewerb Leipzig
- 2003: Prize of the Deutsche Schallplattenkritik
- 2011: Echo Klassik – Singer of the Year
