= Anna Bonitatibus =

Italian opera singer

Anna Bonitatibus (born in Potenza in the Basilicata region) is an Italian mezzo-soprano.

== Career ==
Bonitatibus debuted at La Scala in 1999. She has appeared in many bel canto operas and recordings. She has recorded several times under the direction of Alan Curtis; duets by Alessandro Scarlatti with Patrizia Ciofi, an album of Haydn arias L'infedeltà costante, and Handel operas: Elisa in Tolomeo, Irene in Tamerlano and the castrato role of Ulysses in Deidamia.

Bonitatibus won the International Opera Awards 2015, for the category CD (Operatic Recital) with the album Semiramide – La Signora regale, DHM.
