= Christina Maria Avoglio =

Italian opera singer

Christina Maria Avoglio or Avolia (floruit, 1727–1746) was a soprano in Handel's opera company.

She was very probably from German origin. According to Kutsch-Riemann and Winton Dean/Freeman she was born as Christina Maria Graumann or Croumann, perhaps in Mainz or Frankfurt, and married to the Italian musician Giuseppe Avoglio. According to Thijsse and Rasch, she was born as Christina Maria Gronemann, member of a family of musicians and the sister of the violinist, organist and carillon player Albertus Gronemann from Westfalia in Germany, who went to the Netherlands.

She arrived in London by 1740 and appeared in both the Dublin and London premieres of Messiah in 1741 and 1743 respectively (in Dublin she was one of the few non-cathedral singers in the performance). She also appeared in the premiere casts of Samson (1743) and Semele (1744).
