= Daniel Sullivan (countertenor) =

Irish countertenor

Daniel Sullivan (died 1764) was an Irish countertenor, best known for his association with composer Georg Frideric Handel.

== Early career ==
He began his career in the early 1740s, gaining recognition for his performances with John Frederick and his wife Isabella Lampe. His early notable work included a role in John Lampe's The Dragon of Wantley at Drury Lane in 1743.

== Collaboration with Handel ==
In 1744, Sullivan joined Handel's circle, performing in one of his Covent Garden oratorios. That same year, he took on the role of Athamas in Semele (Handel) Originally written for a tenor, but the part was adapted by Handel to suit Sullivan’s countertenor range.
