= Giovanni Battista Andreoni =

Italian classical castrato singer (1720–1797)

Giovanni Battista Andreoni (1720– 23 April 1797) was an Italian castrato singer with a mezzo-soprano range.

== Life and career ==
Andreoni went in 1736 to sing for the court of Lucca. Then in 1738/39 he was engaged by the opera houses in Venice, after which he went to London.

He was engaged for the season of 1740 in London. He seems to have had an artificial low soprano or contralto voice, for his name appears to the song "Let Hymen oft appear" in Handel's L'Allegro, il Penseroso ed il Moderato, to which the composer added in his manuscript the words "un tono più basso in sopno", meaning that it must be transposed for him. The song was probably sung by him in Italian, as a translation, beginning "Se l'Imeneo fra noi verrà", is added, as also to the song "And ever against eating cares" ("E contro all' aspre cure"), which is given to the same singer. He had arrived too recently to be able to learn the language in time for the performance. He sang the contralto man's part in Handel's Imeneo the same year, and in Deidamia in 1741. He does not seem to have gone with Handel to Ireland, but went on to work in Florence and Spain. He left his position as a vocalist and priest at the Palatine Chapel in Lucca on 22 March 1785. He died on 23 April 1797 in Lucca.
