= Serge Andreoni =

French politician (born 1940)

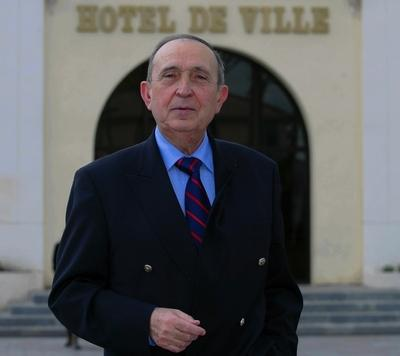
Serge Andreoni

Serge Andreoni (born 15 March 1940) is a former member of the Senate of France who represented the Bouches-du-Rhône department from 2008 to 2014. He is a member of the Socialist Party.

== Biography ==
Born in Marseille and of Corsican origin, trained as an occupational physician, he is a former independent mayor of Berre-l'Étang and entered the Senate (France) in the 2008 senatorial elections. Re-elected mayor of Berre-l'Étang in the March 2014 municipal elections, he did not stand for re-election in the Senate elections the following September. In October 2011, he was placed under investigation for “complicity in influence peddling” in connection with the Guérini affair.

== Bibliography ==
- Page on the Senate website (in French)
