= Daniel Y. Sullivan =

Daniel Y. Sullivan (February 4, 1948 – July 17, 2012) was an American dentist, prosthodontist, author, and teacher credited with helping to bring the practice of osseointegrated dental implants, or the fusion of bone and titanium inside the mouth, to the United States. He worked alongside Swedish pioneer Per-Ingvar Brånemark to insert the U.S.’s first osseointegrated dental implants in 1982. In later years, he taught the technique to thousands of dentists, served as president of two prestigious dental membership organizations, and co-wrote one of the first textbooks in the United States on the subject of esthetic dental implants.

== Early work ==
After receiving his B.S. from the College of the Holy Cross, Sullivan received his D.D.S. from the Georgetown University School of Dentistry in 1974 and completed a certificate program in Advanced Prosthodontic Education from the University of Southern California School of Dentistry in 1976. He opened a private practice specializing in prosthodontics in Falls Church, Virginia, and also taught courses in fixed prosthodontics at Georgetown University and the University of Pennsylvania.

== Dental implantology ==
Sullivan attended the 1982 Toronto Conference on Osseointegration in Clinical Dentistry as the representative of the American College of Prosthodontists, and watched Per-Ingvar Brånemark deliver his seminal presentation on titanium endosseous implants. Prior to this, the dental community had been highly skeptical of the new advances in implant dentistry. According to Brånemark, “The first day of the 2 day conference was quite negative, but the second day [the conference] accepted the clinical possibilities and prognosis, and that was the decisive event” in the history of dental osseointegration.

Sullivan later said of the conference, “I was stunned by what I was seeing, because I could see the impact of it.” Prior to the conference, Sullivan had observed implant success rates of less than 60%; Brånemark's new methods saw success above 90%.

Sullivan approached Brånemark hoping to join him at a training seminar in Sweden to learn his techniques. At first, Brånemark refused, believing it should be university faculty from prestigious U.S. universities that brought endosseous implants to the United States. However, American dentistry was skeptical of osseointegration, and no universities signed up to join Brånemark's training sessions in Sweden. Soon after, Sullivan received his invitation and asked two colleagues to join him.

In August 1982, two months after the training seminar, Brånemark joined Sullivan and two colleagues in Bethesda, Maryland. Over two days, they performed the first four surgeries of endosseous titanium dental implants in the United States.

== Impact on osseointegration and esthetic dentistry ==
Sullivan was a founding member of New York City's “The Osseointegration Study Group,” which grew to become the Academy of Osseointegration, "the most influential and important dental implant educational organization in the world." He later served as that organization's sixth president. He also was a president of the American Academy of Esthetic Dentistry (AAED), which labels its members as “truly the elite professionals of [dentistry who] are internationally known for their work.” Sullivan posthumously won AAED's prestigious Charles L. Pincus Award, which had only been presented nine other times since the academy's founding in 1975, and he was also nominated for the American Dental Association's Gold Medal Award for Dental Research, one of dentistry's highest honors.

In addition to performing implant surgeries during decades of private practice, Sullivan is credited with mentoring and teaching the techniques of implant dentistry to thousands of dentists. Alongside one of these mentees, Stephen Parel, Sullivan also co-wrote one of the earliest textbooks on the subject, Esthetics and Osseointegration, which Parel claims to be the first textbook on dental implant esthetics ever published in the United States. Sullivan also wrote more than 26 other publications and delivered more than 240 lectures on implant dentistry to international and national audiences.

== See also ==
- Osseointegration
- Prosthodontics
- Per-Ingvar Brånemark
- Cosmetic Dentistry
