= Deidamia (opera) =

Opera by Georg Friedrich Händel

George Frideric Handel

Deidamia (HWV 42) is an opera in three acts composed by George Frideric Handel to an Italian libretto by Paolo Antonio Rolli. It premiered on 10 January 1741 at Lincoln's Inn Fields Theatre, London.

== Performance history ==
A ballad opera on the same story by John Gay had been performed in London in 1733, under the title Achilles.

Handel's opera, a co-production with the Earl of Holderness, was first performed on 10 January 1741 at London's Lincoln's Inn Fields Theatre, but received only two more performances at a time when the public was becoming tired of Italian opera. The work was Handel's last Italian opera, and he subsequently turned his attention to composing oratorios. The opera was revived in the 1950s and it receives staged performances today, e.g. the 2012 staging by David Alden for Netherlands Opera.

== Roles ==
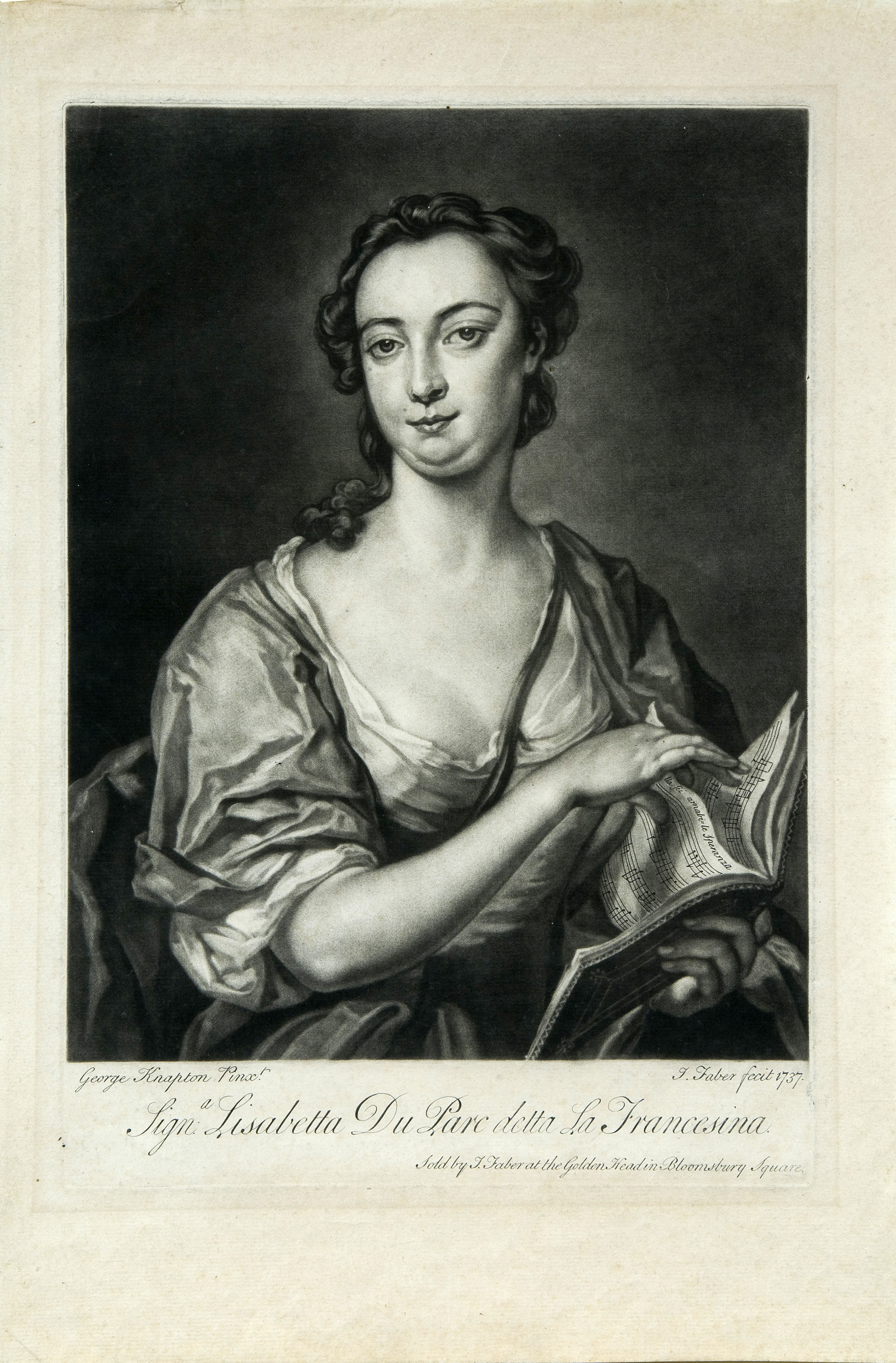
Élisabeth Duparc, who created the role of Deidamia

Roles, voice types, and premiere cast
Role	Voice type	Premiere Cast, 10 January 1741
Deidamia, daughter of Licomede	soprano	Elisabeth Duparc ("La Francesina")
Nerea, friend of Deidamia	soprano	Maria Monza
Achille (Achilles), in women's dress, under the name of Pirra	soprano	Miss Edwards
Ulisse (Odysseus), King of Ithaca, using the name Antiloco	mezzo-soprano castrato	Giovanni Battista Andreoni
Fenice (Phoenix), King of Argos	bass	William Savage
Licomede (Lycomedes), King of Skyros	bass	Henry Theodore Reinhold

== Synopsis ==
The opera is based upon the Greek mythological character Deidamia, the daughter of King Lycomedes of Skyros, who bore a child by Achilles, as told in the stories of Achilles on Skyros.

The oracle predicted that Achilles would die if he fought in the Trojan War. In an attempt to forestall this fate, his father Peleus has disguised him as a girl and sent him to live in the palace of his friend Lycomedes, on the island of Skyros, where he is brought up amongst Lycomedes' daughters and becomes the lover of the eldest, Deidamia. As the Greeks prepare for their war against Troy, the priest Calchas reveals that the city cannot be taken without Achilles' help. Ambassadors are sent to Skyros to retrieve him.

=== Act 1 ===
The ambassadors from Agamemnon arrive on Skyros: Ulysses, disguised under the name of Antilochus, Phoenix and Nestor (a silent role). Ulysses asks Lycomedes to contribute military help to the expedition, to which he readily agrees; he then demands that Lycomedes surrender the young Achilles, rumoured to be concealed on the island and essential to the Greek victory. Loyal to his friend Peleus, Lycomedes denies that he is sheltering Achilles, but permits his guests to search for him.

Inside the palace, Deidamia waits longingly for her beloved Pyrrha to return from hunting. Pyrrha – Achilles in disguise – returns flushed with his exertions and rebukes the women for sitting idly indoors. The women leave Deidamia and Achilles together. Deidamia gently chides Achilles for being more in love with the chase than with her. Achilles admits that he loves her, but is not prepared to sacrifice his freedom.

Deidamia's confidante, the princess Nerea, brings news of the strangers arrived from mainland Greece in search of Achilles. Deidamia is immediately anxious on Achilles' behalf and a short conversation with Ulysses convinces her that they must be on their guard.

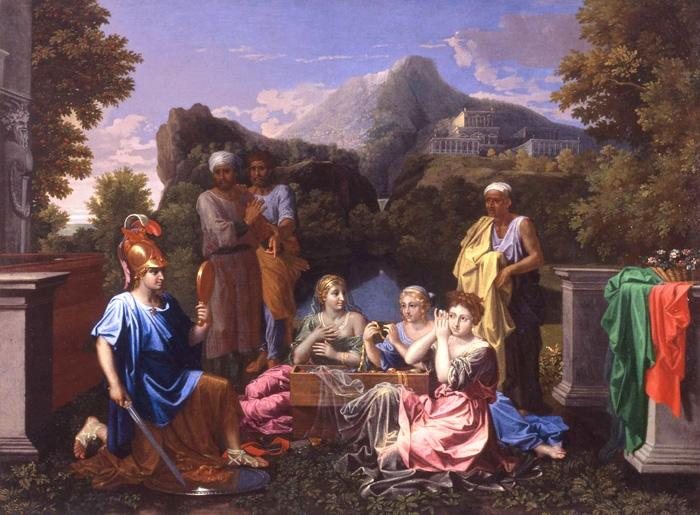
Achilles on Skyros by Nicolas Poussin,1656

=== Act 2 ===
In the palace garden Achilles sees Deidamia talking to Ulysses and is fascinated by his armour and manliness. He listens to their conversations, as Ulysses now pays court to Deidamia in order to win her confidence, and Deidamia politely but firmly refuses him. Stung with jealousy, Achilles petulantly berates her for encouraging Ulysses' attention.

Nerea brings news that Lycomedes has arranged a hunt to entertain their guests. Deidamia is alarmed that Achilles' enthusiasm and hunting skill will betray his identity. But Nerea has also been courted by Phoenix and suggests that she and Deidamia distract the Greeks by appearing to respond to their addresses. Deidamia agrees, but begins to wonder whether Achilles' angry outburst covered a real resolution to abandon her.

Lycomedes recommends the hunting on his estate to Ulysses; he, however, is too old for such sports. The hunt begins, and Nerea attaches herself to Phoenix, gaily taunting him with being more interested in the hunt than in her. Ulysses has been watching 'Pyrrha' and now joins Phoenix: the strange girl's strength and skill in hunting have convinced him that 'she' is in fact Achilles in disguise. Finding an opportunity to draw 'Pyrrha' aside Ulysses begins a feigned declaration of love; Achilles is flattered and amused, and more so when he notices that Deidamia is in hearing. As soon as Ulysses leaves she furiously attacks Achilles for thoughtlessly risking exposure and their happiness.

Achilles shrugs off her anger and is about to rejoin the hunt when he is now stopped by Phoenix, who similarly engages him in conversation. Achilles' lack of interest in love convinces Phoenix that Ulysses was correct: 'Pyrrha' is in fact a man.

=== Act 3 ===
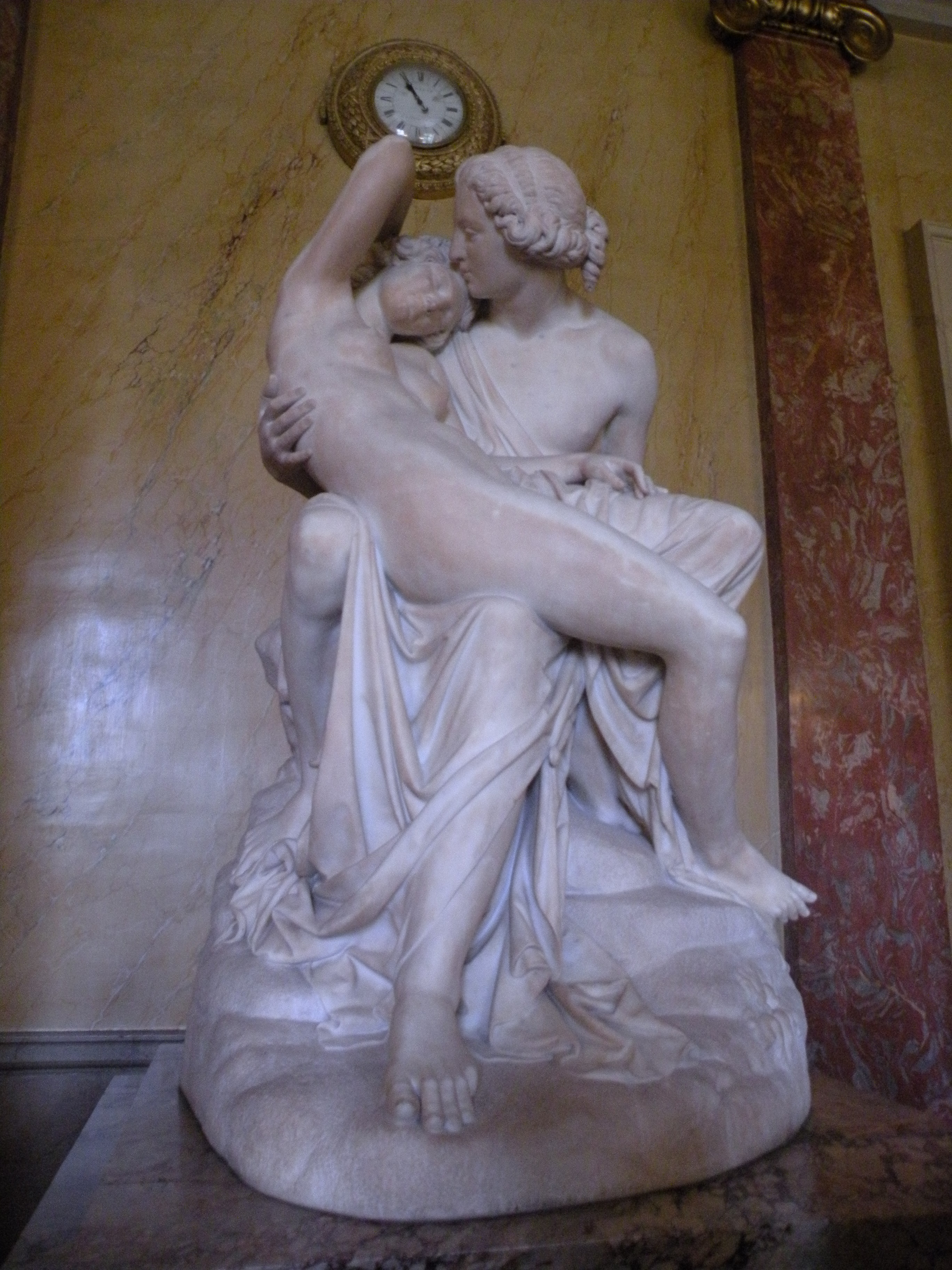
Achilles and Deidamia by Joseph-Michel-Ange Pollet, 1854

Phoenix tries to persuade Nerea that he is in earnest: as a Greek woman herself she should be proud, not jealous, that he is soon to leave for the Trojan war. Nerea realises that she should not let this opportunity slip through her fingers.

Ulysses and Phoenix put into practice a scheme to unmask Achilles. They present the women of the court with a chest of ribbons, fabrics and other finery. As Deidamia frantically urges Achilles to show a girlish interest in them, he instinctively reaches for a helmet, shield and sword cunningly placed amongst the trinkets. A call to arms sounds, and he brandishes the sword ready for action. He has betrayed himself, and Ulysses confronts him with his true identity, urging him to join the Greek force massing against Troy. Achilles enthusiastically agrees. Grief-stricken at the thought of losing him, Deidamia curses Ulysses for destroying her happiness.

Deidamia visits her father and confesses her love for Achilles. Though he blesses their love he tells her that it can last only until Achilles departs, and reveals the prediction that Achilles will die at Troy. Achilles, now at last dressed as a man, comes to Deidamia and proposes that they marry immediately, but her anger and distress at his imminent departure lead them into a quarrel. Ulysses pacifies them by revealing his own identity: he too has famously left his much-loved wife Penelope to go to war, to the greater glory of them both; he predicts that Achilles and Deidamia will achieve similar fame. Deidamia will not be comforted.

Nerea accuses Phoenix of feigning love purely to discover and abduct Achilles. He assures her that his love is genuine; he proposes, and she accepts him. They are joined by the others, Lycomedes now content to surrender Achilles to the Greek cause. Ulysses joins the hands of Deidamia and Achilles, and the final chorus encourages them, and us, to take our fleeting pleasures while we may.

== Scoring ==
The opera is scored for 2 oboes, 2 trumpets in D, 2 horns in D, timpani, bassoons, violone, lute or theorbo, harpsichord, and strings.

== Recordings ==
=== Audio recordings ===
Deidamia discography, audio recordings
Year	Cast: Deidamia, Nerea, Achille, Ulisse, Fenice, Licomede	Conductor, Orchestra,	Label
2000	Julianne Baird, Máire O'Brien, D'Anna Fortunato, Brenda Harris, Peter Castaldi, John Cheek	Rudolph Palmer, Brewer Chamber Orchestra	CD: Albany Records; Cat: TROY460
2002	Simone Kermes, Dominique Labelle, Anna Maria Panzarella, Anna Bonitatibus, Furio Zanasi, Antonio Abete	Alan Curtis, Il Complesso Barocco	CD: Erato Records; Cat: 4409262

=== Video recording ===
Deidamia discography, video recordings
Year	Cast: Deidamia, Nerea, Achille, Ulisse, Fenice, Licomede	Conductor, Orchestra, Stage director	Label
2012	Sally Matthews, Veronica Cangemi, Olga Pasichnyk, Silvia Tro Santafé, Andrew Foster-Williams, Umberto Chiummo	Ivor Bolton, Concerto Köln, David Alden	DVD: Opus Arte; Cat: OABD7110D
