= Daniel Sullivan (entrepreneur) =

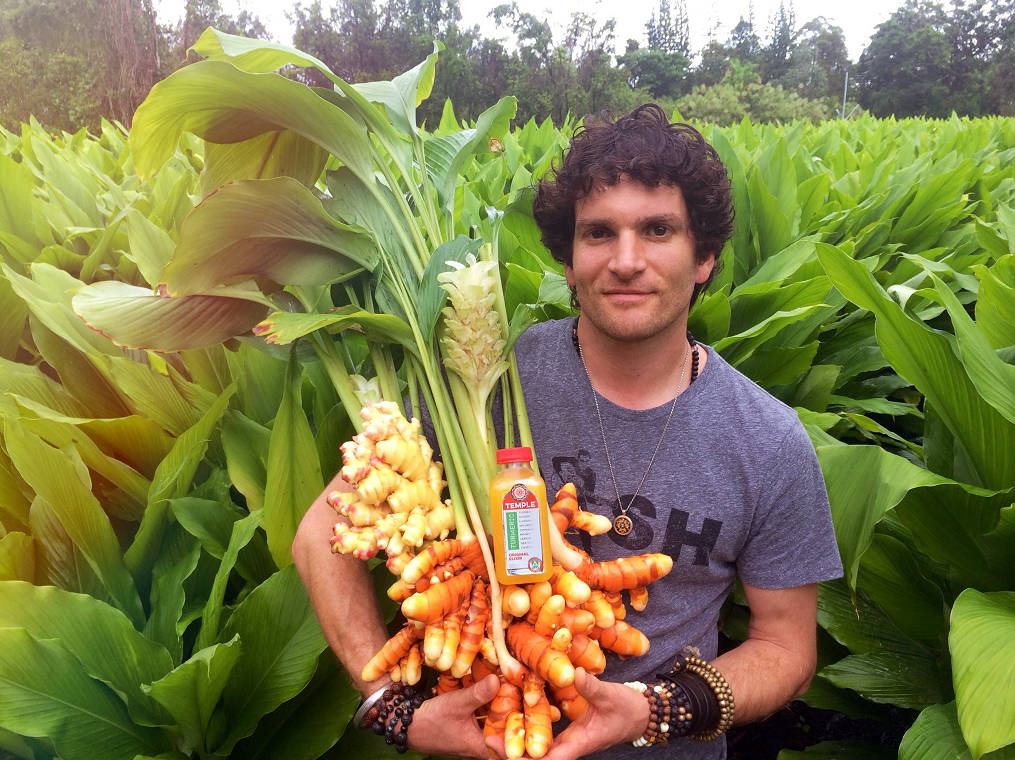
- Known for: Founder, Temple Turmeric

Daniel Sullivan is an American entrepreneur and business executive. He is the founder of Temple Turmeric, an American beverage company known for its turmeric-based ready to drink beverages. He currently serves as the company's CEO and spokesperson for the brand.

Sullivan was a carpenter by trade as well as a health enthusiast. He is a classically trained artist and studied different cultures while traveling the world. He traveled to Hawaii in 2008 on a farming vacation. He was in Maui on an organic farm where he realized that turmeric was the island's largest cash crop. He snacked on raw turmeric during the day and upon returning to New York, founded Temple Turmeric (originally called Turmeric - Elixirs of Life) in 2009.

Sullivan hired a chef to help create a drinkable turmeric juice or beverage that he then marketed locally. He soon thereafter hired additional chefs and a total of 20 employees to keep up with the demand for the drinks. Sullivan led the company from sourcing 300 pounds of turmeric a year in its infancy to approximately 100,000 pounds per year by 2015, all obtained from the same farm in Hawaii. He also led the company from local distribution to a national deal to supply Whole Foods Market with his company's products.

Sullivan is a follower of kundalini yoga and has been interviewed and profiled alongside his products by business and industry media, including BevNET, Crain's New York, Entrepreneur, and Next Accelerator.
