= Saul (Handel) =

Oratorio by George Handel and Charles Jennens

George Frideric Handel

Saul (HWV 53) is a dramatic oratorio in three acts written by George Frideric Handel with a libretto by Charles Jennens. Taken from the First Book of Samuel, the story of Saul focuses on the first king of Israel's relationship with his eventual successor, David—one which turns from admiration to envy and hatred, ultimately leading to the downfall of the eponymous monarch. The work, which Handel composed in 1738, includes the famous "Dead March", a funeral anthem for Saul and his son Jonathan following their deaths in the Battle of Mount Gilboa at the hands of the Philistines, and some of the composer's most dramatic choral pieces. Saul premiered successfully at the King's Theatre in London on 16 January 1739, and was revived by Handel in subsequent seasons.

== Background ==
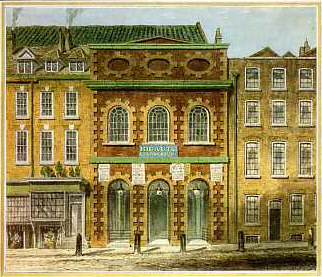
London King's Theatre Haymarket, where Saul was first performed

The German-born Handel had been resident in London since 1712 and had there enjoyed great success as a composer of Italian operas. His opportunities to set English texts to music had been more limited; he had spent the years 1717 to 1719 as composer in residence to the wealthy Duke of Chandos where he had written church anthems and two stage works, Acis and Galatea and Esther; and had composed vocal music to English words for various royal occasions, including a set of Coronation anthems for George II in 1727, which had made a huge impact. In 1731, a performance of the 1718 version of Esther, a work in English based on a Biblical drama by Jean Racine, was given in London without Handel's participation and had proved popular, so Handel revised the work and planned to present it at the theatre where his Italian operas were being presented. However the Bishop of London would not permit a drama based on a Biblical story to be acted out on the stage, and therefore Handel presented Esther in concert form, thus giving birth to the English oratorio.

Esther in its revised form proved a popular work, and Handel, though still continuing to focus on composition of Italian operas, followed Esther with two more sacred dramas with English words to be presented in concert form, Deborah, and Athalia (which, like Esther, was also based on a Biblical drama by Racine), both in 1733.

== Composition and instrumentation ==
By 1738, Handel was experiencing some difficulty in maintaining support for his Italian opera seasons in London and he collaborated for the first time with Charles Jennens, a wealthy landowner and lover of the arts, who also provided the texts for Messiah and other oratorios of Handel. Jennens wrote Saul, an original English text based on Biblical characters, especially designed to provide opportunities for the sort of music Handel composed.

Opera seria, the form of Italian opera that Handel composed for London, focused overwhelmingly on solo arias and recitatives for the star singers and contained very little else; they did not feature separate choruses. With the English oratorios Handel had the opportunity to mix operatic arias in English for the soloists with large choruses of the type that he used in the Coronation anthems. Jennens provided a text with well-rounded characters and dramatic effects. The collaboration with Jennens was not without tension; Jennens referred in a letter to the "maggots" in Handel's head and complained that Handel wanted to end the work with a chorus of "Hallelujahs" that the librettist did not feel was appropriate: at the end of the piece, Israel has been defeated in battle and the King and Crown Prince were both killed; the "Hallelujahs" would be better suited to the celebrations at the opening of the work after David has killed Goliath. Jennens got his way; in the completed version Saul does not end with a chorus of "Hallelujahs" but there is such a chorus where Jennens had wanted one.

Handel composed the music of Saul between July and September 1738. He conceived Saul on the grandest scale and included a large orchestra with many instrumental effects which were unusual for the time including a carillon (a keyboard instrument which makes a sound like chiming bells); a specially constructed organ for himself to play during the course of the work; trombones, not standard orchestral instruments at that time, giving the work a heavy brass component; large kettledrums specially borrowed from the Tower of London; extra woodwinds for the Witch of Endor scene; and a harp solo.

In the same letter in which Jennens complained that Handel wanted a chorus of "Hallelujahs" at a point of the drama the writer felt was inappropriate, he wrote of a meeting he had with Handel to discuss the work and the composer's delight in some of the unusual instruments he planned to use:

Mr. Handel's head is more full of Maggots than ever: I found yesterday in His room a very queer Instrument which He calls Carillon (Anglice a Bell) & says some call it a Tubal-cain, I suppose because it is in the make and tone like a Hammer striking upon Anvils. 'Tis played upon with Keys like a Harpsichord, & with this Cyclopean Instrument he designs to make poor Saul stark mad. His second Maggot is an Organ of 500£ price, which (because he is overstock'd with Money) he has bespoke of one Moss of Barnet; this Organ, he says, is so contriv'd that as he sits at it he has a better command of his Performers than he us'd to have; & he is highly delighted to think with what exactness his Oratorio will be perform'd by the help of this Organ; so that for the future, instead of beating time at his Oratorio's, he is to sit as his Organ all the time with his back to the Audience ... I could tell you more of his Maggots: but it grows late, and I must defer the rest till I write next; by which time, I doubt not, more new ones will breed in his Brain.

Also of note in that letter is the fact that although Handel's London seasons of Italian opera had not been drawing the audiences they had in former years, Jennens makes an incidental remark that the composer was very wealthy ("overstock'd with money").

On 5 December 1738 Lady Katherine Knatchbull, a friend and patron of Handel's, wrote to her brother-in-law James Harris, who was a writer on music and other subjects, and also a friend of the composer, "(Handel) desired me to give his tres humble respects; and that you must come up in January, for he opens with The Loves of Saul and Jonathan, then follows another on the ten plagues of Egypt (to me an odd subject) ... He has had an instrument made after the manner of Tubal-cain's, the inventor of music." (referring to the specially-built carillon. Going on to an attempt to describe a trombone, an instrument she had obviously never seen, she writes:) "He has also introduced the sackbut, a kind of trumpet, with more variety of notes,& it is 7 or 8-foot long,& draws in like a perspective glass, so may be shortened to 3-foot as the player chuses, or thrown out to its full length; despise not this description for I write from his own words."

In the 1954 edition of Grove's Dictionary of Music and Musicians, specialist in the history of musical instruments Anthony Baines wrote that Saul contains the finest music for trombones composed in the 18th century.

== Reception and performance history ==
A report in the London press remarked on the favourable reception given to the work at its first performance, with members of the royal family in attendance. The architect William Kent wrote to Lord Burlington after the first performance, referring to the passage with the carillon, "There is a pretty concerto in the oratorio, there is some stops in the Harpsicord that are little bells, I had thought it had been some squerrls in a cage. Saul was given six performances in its first season, a mark of success at that time, and was one of the works Handel most frequently revived in his subsequent seasons, being given in London in 1740, 1741,1744,1745 and 1750. Saul received a performance in Dublin under Handel's direction "by special request" in 1742.

Already in Handel's own lifetime, choral societies were formed in the English provinces with the aim of performing works of Handel and others, and Saul was performed with a fair degree of regularity by choral societies in London and elsewhere in Britain through the 19th century. Handel's major oratorios including Saul have been frequently performed, broadcast and recorded since the second half of the twentieth century. Saul is sometimes fully staged as an opera today.

In October 2023, Cambridge University's Opera Society cancelled their performance of Saul due to the "current sensitive political situation and unfortunate escalation of the humanitarian crisis in Gaza and Israel."

The excellence of the libretto and the power of Handel's musical characterisation combine to make Saul, in the words of Handel scholar Winton Dean,"one of the supreme masterpieces of dramatic art, comparable with the Oresteia and King Lear".

== Roles ==
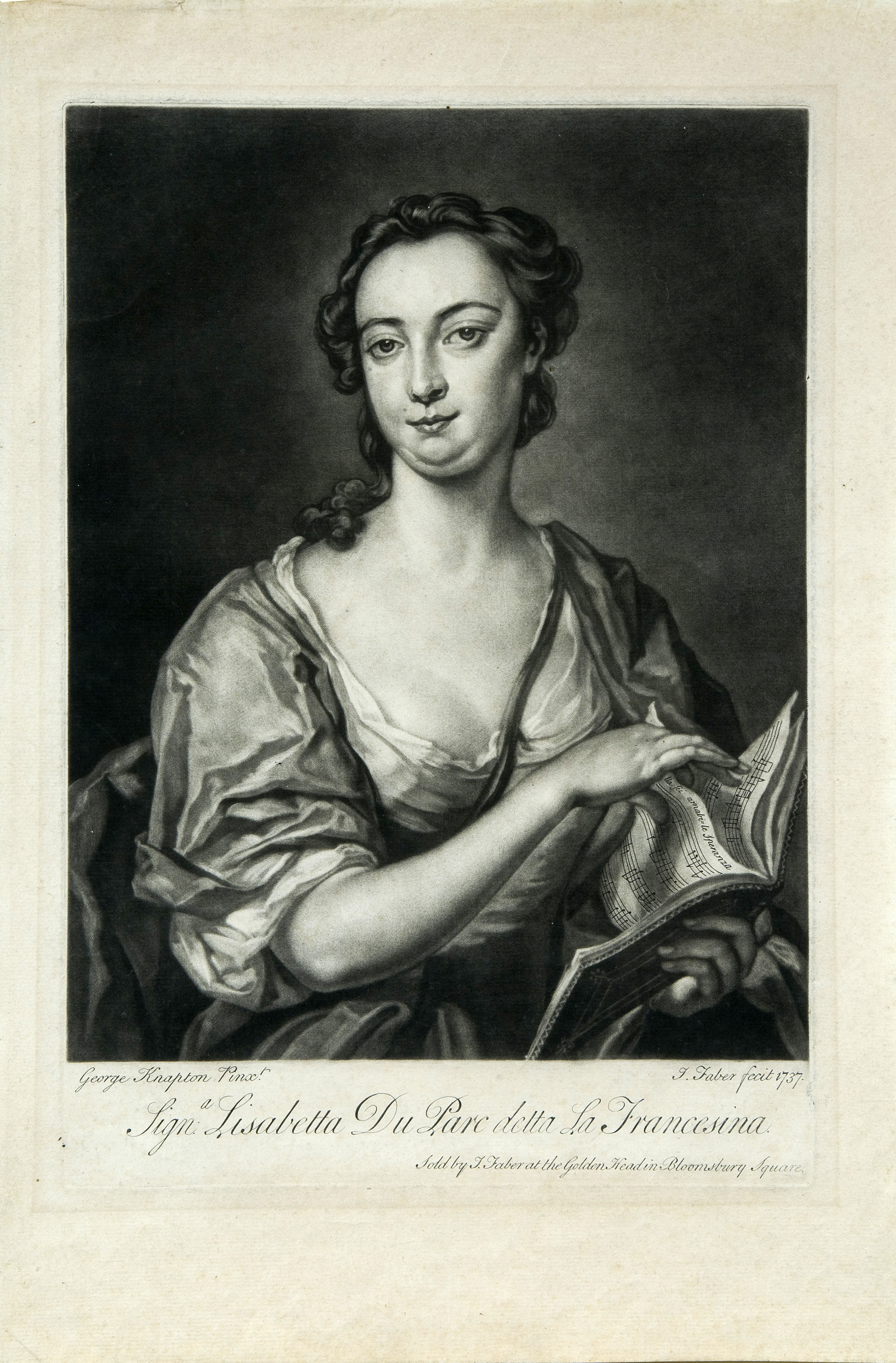
Élisabeth Duparc, creator of the role of Michal

Roles, voice types, and premiere cast
Role	Voice	1739 cast
Saul, King of Israel	bass	Gustavus Waltz
Merab, Princess of Israel	soprano	Cecilia Young
Michal, Princess of Israel	soprano	Élisabeth Duparc ("La Francesina")
Jonathan, Prince of Israel	tenor	John Beard
David, future King of Israel	contralto	Mr Russell
Ghost of Samuel	bass	Mr Hussey
High Priest	tenor	Mr Kelly
Witch of Endor	tenor	Miss Young (possibly Cecilia's sister, Esther?)
Abner	tenor	not stated
Amalekite	tenor	Mr Stoppelaer
Doeg	bass	Mr Butler
Chorus of Israelites		

== Synopsis ==
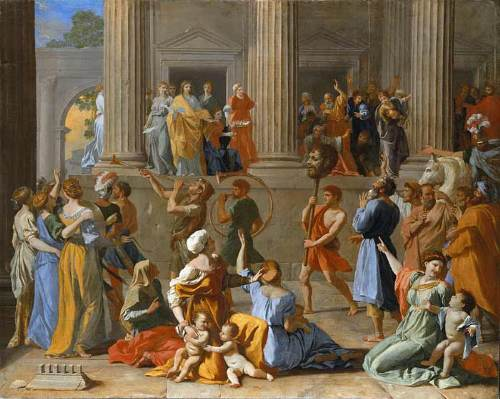
The Triumph of David by Nicolas Poussin

The libretto is freely adapted from the First Book of Samuel, Chapters 16–31, with additional material from the epic poem, the Davideis by Abraham Cowley. The printed libretto of Saul from 1738 credits the Davideis as the source of the contemptuous treatment of David by Princess Merab.

=== Act 1 ===
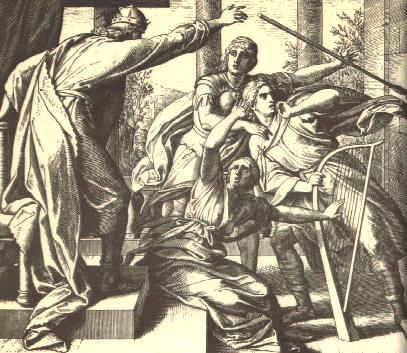
Saul Tries to Kill David by Julius Schnorr von Carolsfeld

The Israelites raise their voices in magnificent thanksgiving to God, for the young warrior David has slain the Philistine giant Goliath. At the court of King Saul, once a mighty warrior himself, all the people celebrate the hero David. Saul's son, Jonathan swears eternal devotion to David, but Saul's two daughters experience contrasting emotions – Michal is in love with David, but Merab feels contempt for him as a social inferior, a feeling that only increases when Saul offers her in marriage to David. A group of Israelite young women offer further tributes to David. King Saul is enraged at the way David is praised. Unable to restrain his anger, he orders Jonathan to kill David.

=== Act 2 ===
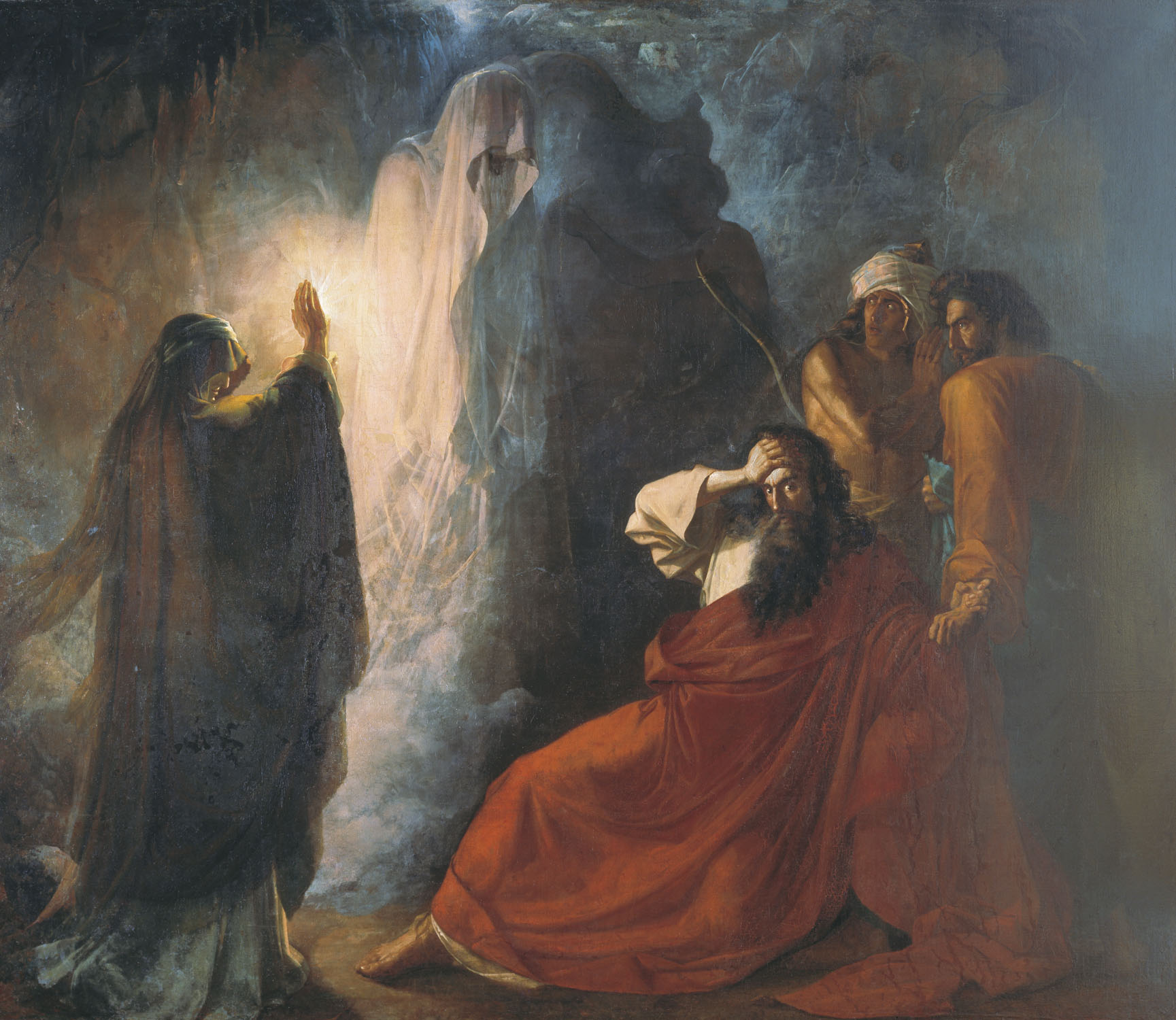
The Witch of Endor (Martynov)

The people of Israel reflect on the destructive power of envy. Jonathan pleads David's case to Saul, who appears to relent. Saul asks Jonathan to bring David back to court and promises Michal as David's bride, though Saul anticipates David's death in battle. David and Michal express their mutual love, but David reports that Saul's rage has not diminished and that Saul threw a javelin close past his head in frustration. Saul summons David to court again as both Michal and Merab express their faith that God will protect David. Jonathan tries to explain to Saul why David has not responded to his summons. Saul rages against both David and Jonathan.

=== Act 3 ===
In despair, and though aware it is unlawful, Saul asks the Witch of Endor to raise the ghost of Samuel the prophet. Asked for advice, the ghost of Samuel reminds Saul that he had once predicted his downfall for sparing the king of the Amalekites whom Samuel had ordered killed. He predicts that David will inherit the kingdom of Israel when Saul and his sons die in the next day's battle. David learns from an Amalekite soldier of the deaths of Saul and Jonathan at the hands of the Amalekites, and David orders the Amalekite killed. After a funeral march for the Israelite dead, Merab, David, and Michal each in turn express their sorrow, particularly for the loss of Jonathan. A high priest predicts David will win future victories and the Israelites urge him to restore their kingdom.

== The "Dead March" ==
The "Dead March" played in Act Three, introducing the obsequies for the deaths of Saul and Jonathan, is in the key of C major. It includes an organ part and trombones alternating with flutes, oboes and quiet timpani. The "Dead March" in Saul has been played at state funerals in the United Kingdom, including that of Winston Churchill. It is the standard funeral march of the armed forces of Germany, played by the Staff Band of the Bundeswehr at all state funerals. It was also performed at the funeral of George Washington, during the funeral procession of Stonewall Jackson, as well as being played many times during the journey of the body of Abraham Lincoln after his assassination to Springfield, Illinois. In 2015, it was performed at the state funeral of Lee Kuan Yew, the first Prime Minister of Singapore.

== List of arias and musical numbers ==
(Note: "Symphony" in this context means a purely instrumental piece. "Accompagnato" is a recitative accompanied by the orchestra, rather than by continuo instruments only, as in the passages marked "recitative.").

Act One
1. Overture
An Epinicion or Song of Triumph, for the victory
over Goliath and the Philistines.
2a. Chorus of Israelites "How excellent thy name, O Lord"
3. Air (soprano) "An infant rais'd by Thy command"
4. Trio "Along the monster atheist strode"
5. Chorus of Israelites "The youth inspir'd by Thee, O Lord"
2b.Chorus of Israelites "How excellent Thy name, O Lord"
End of the Epinicion
6. Recitative (Michal) "He comes, he comes!"
7. Air (Michal)"O godlike youth"
8. Recitative (Abner, Saul, David) "Behold, O King"
9. Air (David) "O King, your favours with delight"
10. Recitative (Jonathan) "Oh, early piety!"
11. Air (Merab) "What abject thoughts a prince can have!"
12. Recitative (Merab) "Yet think on whom this honour you bestow"
13. Air (Jonathan) "Birth and fortune I despise!"
14. Recitative (High Priest) "Go on, illustrious pair!"
15. Air (High Priest) "While yet thy tide of blood runs high"
16. Recitative (Saul, Merab) "Thou, Merab, first in birth"
17. Air (Merab) "My soul rejects the thought with scorn"
18. Air (Michal "See, with what a scornful air"
19. Air (Michal) "Ah, lovely youth"
20. Symphony
21. Recitative (Michal) "Already see the daughters of the land"
22. Chorus of Israelites "Welcome, welcome, mighty king!"
23. Accompagnato (Saul) "What do I hear? Am I then sunk so low"
24. Chorus of Israelites "David his ten thousands slew"
25. Accompagnato (Saul) "To him ten thousands, and to me but thousands!"
26. Air (Saul) "With rage I shall burst his praises to hear!"
27. Recitative (Jonathan, Michal) "Imprudent women!"
28. Air (Michal) "Fell rage and black despair possess'd"
29. Recitative (High Priest) "This but the smallest part of harmony"
30. Accompagnato (High Priest) "By Thee this universal frame"
31. Recitative (Abner) "Racked with infernal pains"
32. Air (David) "O Lord, whose mercies numberless"
33. Symphony
34. Recitative (Jonathan) "'Tis all in vain"
35. Air (Saul) "A serpent, in my bosom warm'd"
36. Recitative (Saul) "Has he escap'd my rage?"
37. Air (Merab) "Capricious man, in humour lost"
38. Accompagnato (Jonathan) "O filial piety!"
39. Air (Jonathan) "No, cruel father, no!"
40. Air (High Priest) "O Lord, whose providence"
41. Chorus "Preserve him for the glory of Thy name"

Act Two
42. Chorus "Envy, eldest born of hell"
43. Recitative (Jonathan, David) "Ah, dearest friend"
44. Air (Jonathan) "But sooner Jordan's stream, I swear"
45. Recitative (David, Jonathan) "Oh, strange vicissitude"
46. Air (David) "Such haughty beauties"
47. Recitative (Jonathan) "My father comes"
48. Recitative (Saul) "Hast thou obey'd my orders"
49. Air (Jonathan) "Sin not, O King"
50. Air (Saul) "As great Jehovah lives, I swear"
51. Air (Jonathan) "From cities stormed, and battles won"
52. Recitative (Jonathan, Saul) "Appear, my friend"
53. Air (David) "Your words, O King"
54. Recitative (Saul) "Yes, he shall wed my daughter!"
55. Recitative (Michal) "A father's will has authorized my love"
56. Duet (Michal and David) "O fairest of ten thousand fair"
57. Chorus "Is there a man, who all his ways"
58. Symphony
59. Recitative (David) "Thy father is as cruel"
60. Duet (David and Michal) "At persecution I can laugh"
61. Recitative (Michal, Doeg) "Whom dost thou seek"
62. Air (Michal) "No, no, let the guilty tremble"
63. Recitative (Merab) "Mean as he was, he is my brother now"
64. Air (Merab) "Author of peace"
65. Symphony
66. Accompagnato (Saul) "The time at length is come"
67. Recitative (Saul, Jonathan) "Where is the son of Jesse?"
68. Chorus "Oh, fatal consequence of rage"

Act Three
69. Accompagnato (Saul) "Wretch that I am"
70. Accompagnato (Saul) "'Tis said, here lives a woman"
71. Recitative (The witch of Endor, Saul) "With me what would'st thou?"
72. Air (Witch) "Infernal spirits"
73. Accompagnato (The Ghost of Samuel, Saul) "Why hast thou forc'd me from the realms of peace"
74. Symphony
75. Recitative (David, an Amalekite) "Whence comest thou?"
76. Air (David) "Impious wretch, of race accurst!"
77. Symphony: Dead march
Elegy on the death of Saul and Jonathan
78. Chorus "Mourn, Israel, mourn"
79. Air (High Priest) "Oh, let it not in Gath be heard"
80. Air (Merab) "From this unhappy day"
81. Air (David) "Brave Jonathan his bow never drew"
82. Chorus of Israelites "Eagles were not so swift as they"
83. Air (Michal) "In sweetest harmony they lived"
84. Solo and Chorus (David and Israelites) "O fatal day! How low the mighty lie!"
End of the Elegy
85. Recitative (High Priest) "Ye men of Judah, weep no more!"
86. Chorus of Israelites "Gird on thy sword, thou man of might"

== Musical features ==
Saul is composed for soloists and chorus, two flutes, two oboes, two trumpets, three trombones, kettledrums, organ, harp, continuo instruments, and strings. The work begins and ends in C major, a key choice which may have been influenced by the presence of trombones in the orchestra. Handel's other work of the same season to use trombones, Israel in Egypt, also favours C major for the choruses with trombones in their accompaniment.

The first piece of music is an overture in the Italian style in three movements, the first quick and fugal, then a slow movement, followed by another quick section with the addition of a concerto-like passage for organ, which Handel played himself at the original performances as he directed the musicians. The overture is followed by a slower dance-like piece for orchestra, marked andante larghetto.

=== Act One ===
The act begins with the chorus of celebration after David has slain Goliath. Trumpets and trombones, which were not present in the overture, are now added. The chorus of rejoicing is developed briefly in counterpoint. A slower air for soprano in a minor key praising David's achievement is followed by a chorus for alto, tenor and bass marked, unusually, Ardito (boldly), and then a longer chorus with developed counterpoint is heard. The chorus which opened the act is repeated, followed by a jubilant chorus of "Hallelujah", to end the opening "Epinicion or Song of Triumph". The expansive scale of the multi-part overture, and the glitter and celebratory quality of the Epinicion are indications, according to Jonathan Keates, of the ambition of the work as a whole and its monumental achievement.

Other of the most notable musical features of Act One include the chorus and dance movement including the carillon with a chorus of praise for David, which rouse King Saul to terrible jealousy. David's attempt to soothe the King is conveyed in an aria of "simple purity","O Lord, whose mercies numberless", followed by harp solo. David's efforts are in vain, and the King's jealousy breaks out into an aria of fury "A serpent, in my bosom warm'd", which suddenly and unexpectedly breaks off as the King hurls his javelin at David, depicted in the music by descending octaves in the strings. A chorus in the key of G minor, developed contrapuntally, ends the act as the chorus pray that God will protect David.

=== Act Two ===
The second act begins as the chorus comment on the drama after the manner of the chorus in Greek tragedy, in "Envy, eldest born of hell" which according to musicologist Paul Henry Lang is "as mighty a piece as Handel ever composed". Dotted rhythms over a relentlessly repeated ostinato bass depict the obsessive jealousy of the King as the chorus warn him "Hide thee in the black night".

Two purely instrumental passages ("symphonies") feature in Act Two. The first, depicting the celebrations for the wedding of David and Michal, is in three parts, a slow and solemn introduction with trombones prominent, the second section a brisk organ concerto, concluding with a slower movement in the form of a gavotte. The second instrumental passage in the act is a shorter festive piece with trumpets and drums, trombones, woodwinds and strings, depicting the holiday of the New Moon.

A chorus in the key of D major, with a chromatic fugal section at the end, concludes the act as the chorus denounce the King as a monster for the attempted murders of both Jonathan and David.

=== Act Three ===
Act three opens with a powerful and dramatic accompanied recitative for King Saul as he seeks advice from the Witch of Endor. The Witch invokes the ghost of Samuel in a passage which conjures up a supernatural atmosphere by the use of an irregular bass line with prominent oboes and bassoons. Bassoons also introduce the Ghost of Samuel as the apparition prophesies doom for the King. A martial "Battle symphony" with trumpets and drums ensues, followed shortly by the famous Dead March. Chorus and soloists mourn the deaths of the King and his son, and the work concludes with a chorus in the key of C major urging David to lead his country into battle against its enemies.

== Selected recordings ==
Saul discography
Year	Cast:Saul, Merab, Michal, Jonathan, David, Ghost of Samuel, Witch of Endor	Conductor, orchestra and chorus	Label
1973	Donald McIntyre, Margaret Price, Sheila Armstrong, Ryland Davies, James Bowman, Stafford Dean; John Winfield	Charles Mackerras, English Chamber Orchestra, Leeds Festival Chorus	CD:Archiv 0289 447 6962 3 ADD AX3
1981	Thomas Allen, Sally Burgess, Margaret Marshall, Robert Tear, Paul Esswood, Matthew Best, Martyn Hill	Philip Ledger, English Chamber Orchestra, King's College Choir, Cambridge	CD:Virgin 7243 5 62118 2 7
1985	Dietrich Fischer-Dieskau, Julia Varady, Elizabeth Gale, Anthony Rolfe-Johnson, Paul Esswood; Matthias Hölle, Helmut Wildhaber	Nikolaus Harnoncourt, Concentus Musicus Wien, Konzertvereinigung Wiener Staatsopernchor live recording from a concert	CD:Das Alte Werk 2564 686983
1989	Alastair Miles, Donna Brown, Lynne Dawson, John Mark Ainsley, Derek Lee Ragin, Richard Savage, Phillip Salmon	John Eliot Gardiner, English Baroque Soloists, Monteverdi Choir	CD:Phillips 000942802
1997	Gregory Reinhart, Simone Kermes, Vasilijka Jezovsek, John Elwes, Matthias Koch, Michail Schelomjanskis, Johannes Kalpers	Peter Neumann, Collegium Cartusianum, Kölner Kammerchor	CD:MDG 332 0801-2
2004	Neal Davies, Nancy Argenta, Susan Gritton, Mark Padmore, Andreas Scholl, Paul Agnew, Angus Smith	Paul McCreesh, Gabrieli Players, Gabrieli Consort	CD:Archiv 0289 474 5102
2012	Christopher Purves, Elizabeth Atherton, Joélle Harvey, Robert Murray, Sarah Connolly, Stuart Young, Jeremy Budd	Harry Christophers, The Sixteen; The Sixteen Chorus	CD:Coro COR16103
2020	Markus Brück, Sophie Bevan, Mary Bevan. Benjamin Hulett, Eric Jurenas, Raphael Höhn, Raphael Höhn	Laurence Cummings, Festspiel Orchester Göttingen, NDR Chor	CD:Accent ACC26414
