= Élisabeth Duparc =

French opera singer (1715–1778)

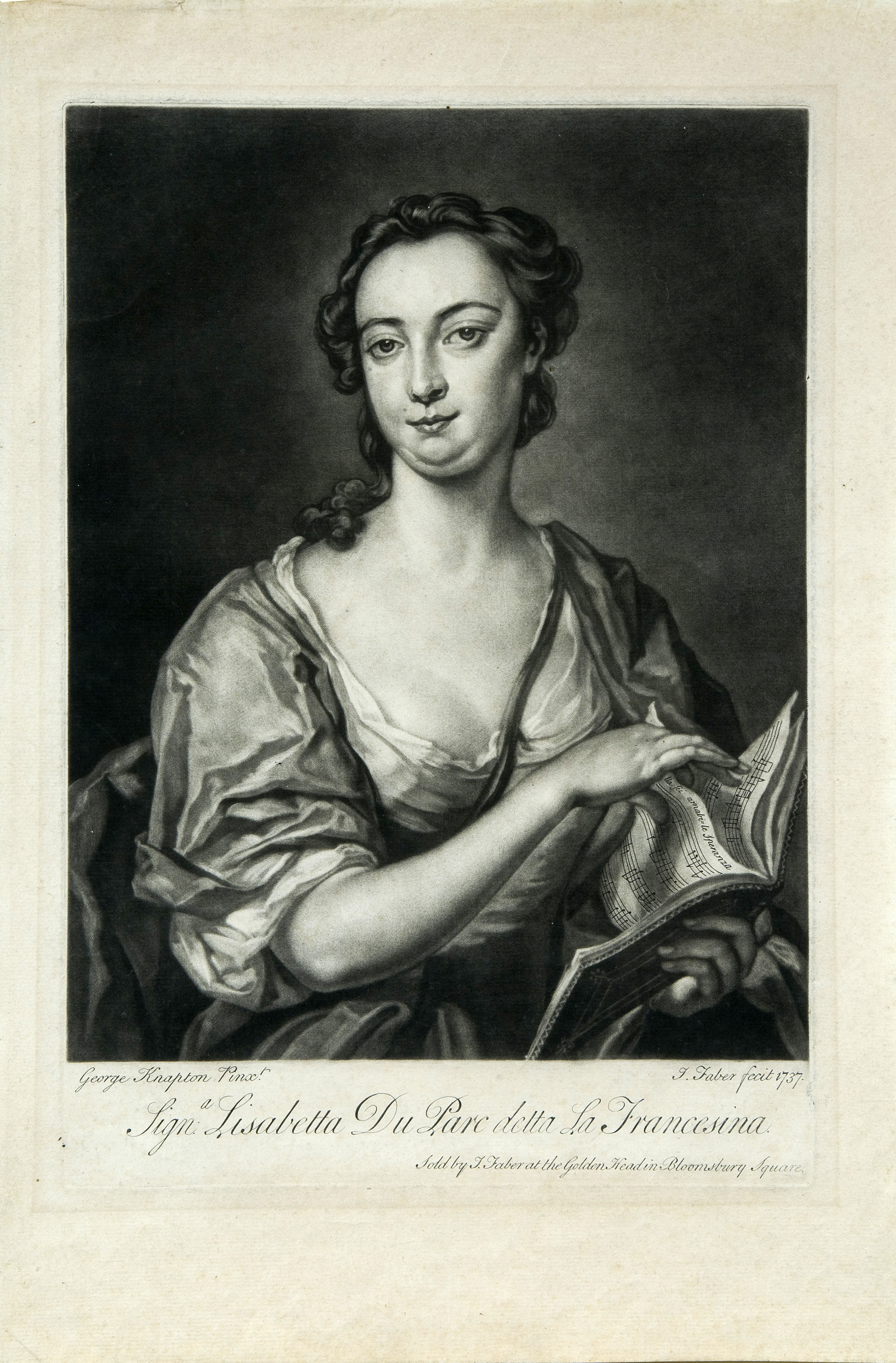
Élisabeth Duparc

Élisabeth Duparc or Du Parc, nicknamed "La Francesina", (c. 1715 – died July 20, 1778) was a French soprano.

She was notable for appearing in several premieres and performances of the oratorios and operas of Handel - she played the title role, for example, in the premieres of Semele, and sang in the premiere of Serse and Saul.

After training in Italy she sang in Florence (1731, 1734–35) then London (1736 onwards) - at the latter she initially joined the Opera of the Nobility, where she appeared in operas by Riccardo Broschi, Egidio Duni, Giovanni Battista Pescetti and Francesco Maria Veracini.
