= Concordia (mythology) =

Roman goddess of harmony

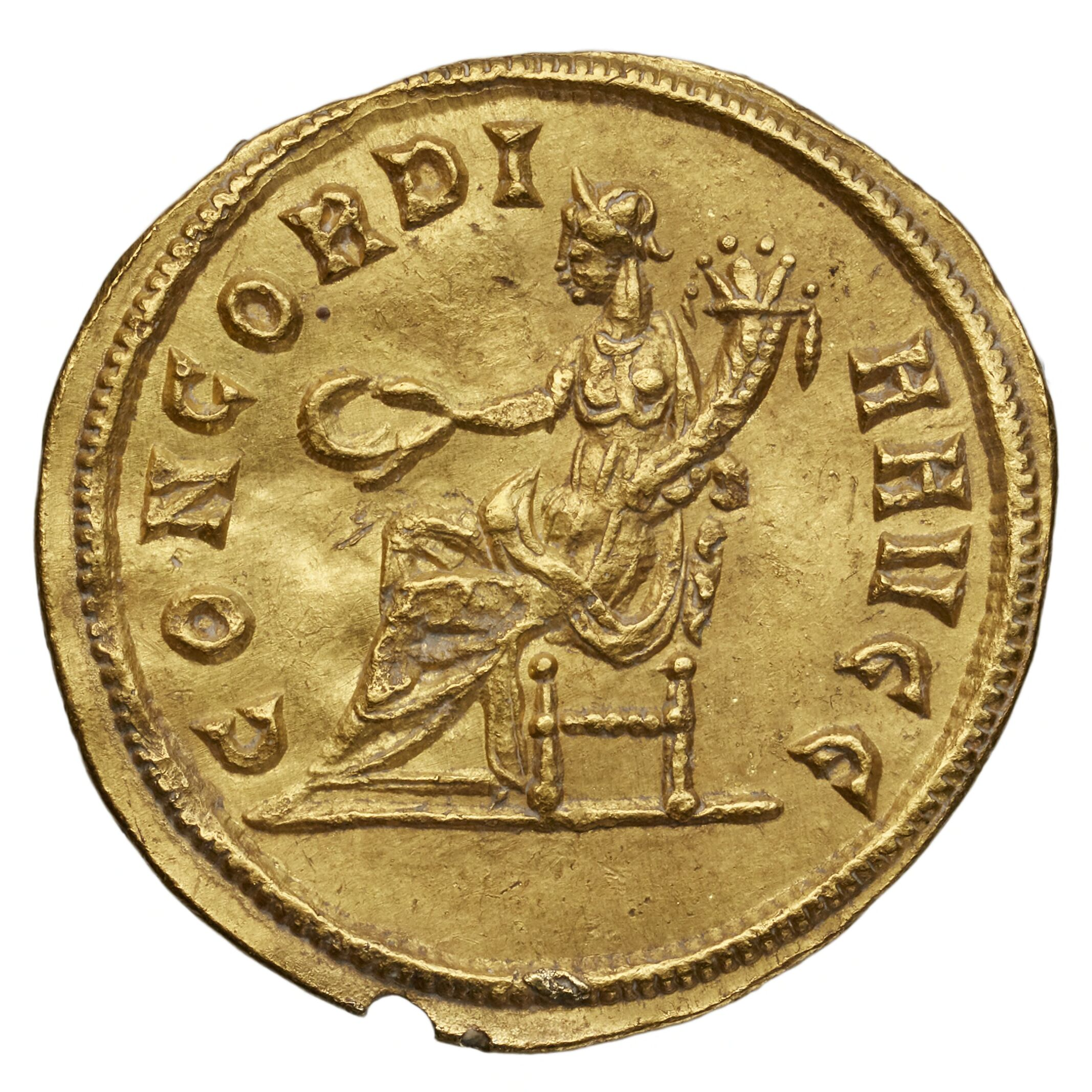
Concordia Augustae enthroned, extending a patera and holding a cornucopia, on an aureus issued August 284 under the co-reigning brothers Numerian and Carinus

Statue of Concordia in Bardo Museum in Gigthis, Tunisia

In ancient Roman religion, Concordia ("concord" or "harmony" in Latin) is the goddess who embodies agreement in marriage and society. Her Greek equivalent is usually regarded as Harmonia, with musical harmony a metaphor for an ideal of social concord or entente in the political discourse of the Republican era. She was thus often associated with Pax ("Peace") in representing a stable society. As such, she is more closely related to the Greek concept of homonoia (likemindedness), which was also represented by a goddess.

Concordia Augusta was cultivated as an aspect of Imperial cult. Dedicatory inscriptions to her, on behalf of emperors and members of the imperial family, were common.

== In art and numismatics ==
In Roman art, Concordia was often depicted enthroned, wearing a long cloak and holding objects such as a patera (sacrificial bowl), cornucopia (symbol of prosperity), or a caduceus (symbol of peace). Standing, she was often shown between two other figures, either deities holding their own attributes or members of the imperial family shaking hands. She was placed frequently in a triad of goddesses, often with Pax, Salus or Securitas, or Fortuna. She was also paired with Hercules and Mercury, representing "Security and Luck" respectively.

Several imperial coins depicted the goddess Concordia, such as those issued by Marcus Aurelius and Lucius Verus.

== Temples ==
The oldest Temple of Concord, built in 367 BC by Marcus Furius Camillus, stood on the Roman Forum. Other temples and shrines in Rome dedicated to Concordia were largely geographically related to the main temple, and included (in date order):

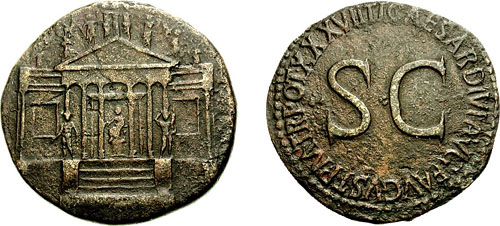
Sestertius of Tiberius, authorized by the Senate (SC), depicting a Temple of Concordia restored by him: the cult statue of Concordia is flanked by statues of Hercules and Mercury, with statues of other deities standing on the pediment

- a bronze shrine (aedicula) of Concord erected by the aedile Gnaeus Flavius in 304 BC "in Graecostasis" and "in area Volcani" (placing it on the Graecostasis, close to the main temple of Concord). He vowed it in the hope of reconciling the nobility who had been outraged by his publication of the calendar, but the senate would vote no money for its construction and this thus had to be financed out of the fines of condemned usurers. It must have been destroyed when the main temple was enlarged by Opimius in 121 BC.
- one built on the arx (probably on the east side, overlooked the main temple of Concord below). It was probably vowed by the praetor Lucius Manlius in 218 BC after quelling a mutiny among his troops in Cisalpine Gaul, with building work commencing in 217 and dedication occurring on 5 February 216.
- a temple to Concordia Nova, marking the end Julius Caesar had brought to civil war. It was voted by the senate in 44 BC. but was possibly never built.
- a shrine or temple dedicated by Livia according to Ovid's Fasti VI.637‑638 ("te quoque magnifica, Concordia, dedicat aede Livia quam caro praestitit ipsa viro" - the only literary reference to this temple). Ovid's description of the Porticus Liviae in the same poem suggests that the shrine was close to or within the porticus. It is possibly to be identified with the small rectangular structure marked on the Marble Plan (frg. 10), but scholarly opinion has been divided on this.

In Pompeii, the high priestess Eumachia dedicated a building to Concordia Augusta.

== Legacy ==
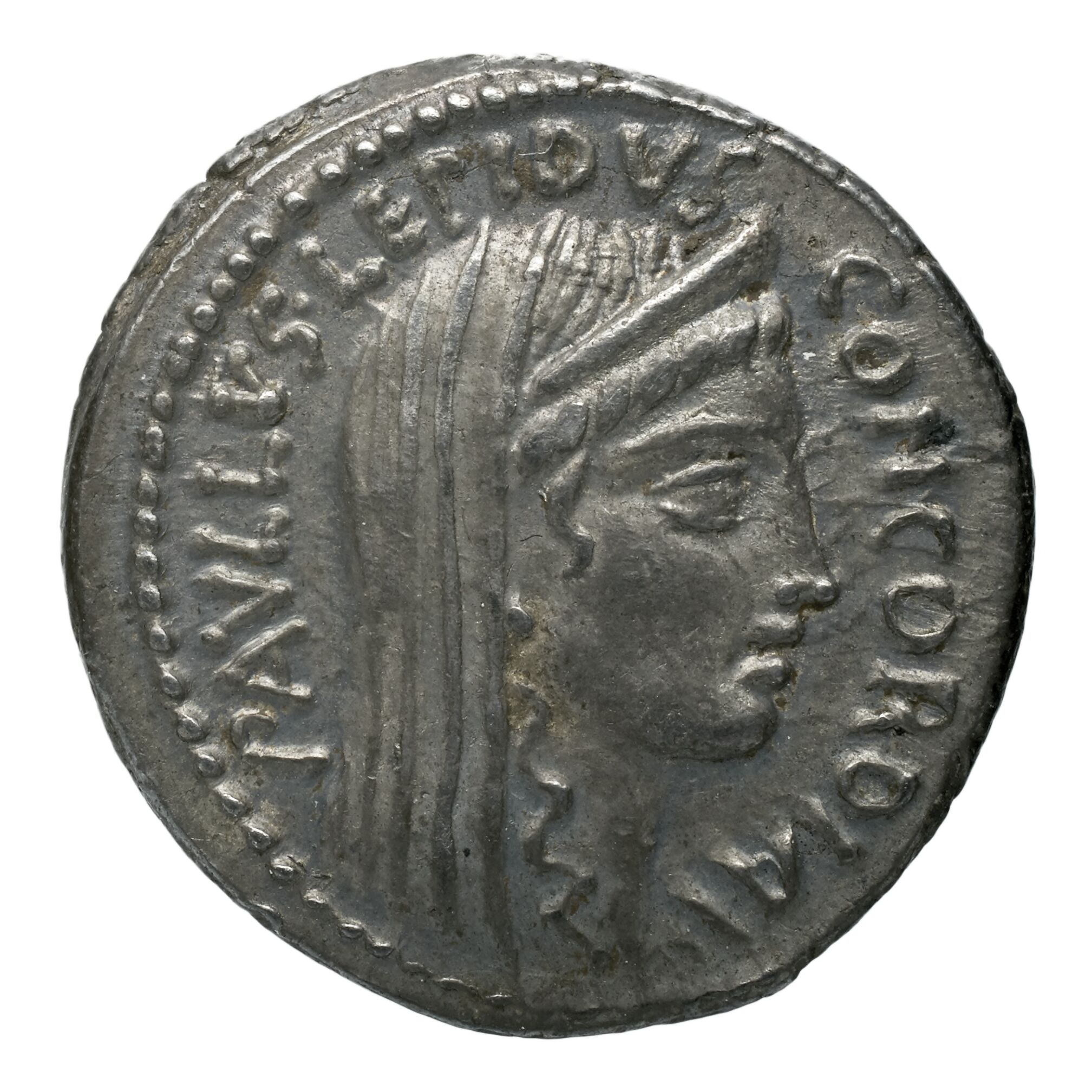
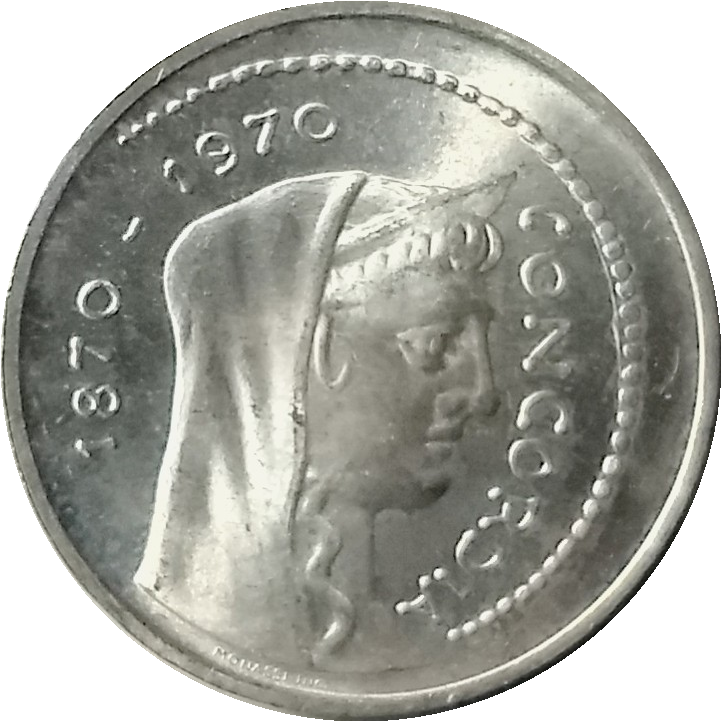
Concordia on a denarius of the gens Aemilia, 62 BC, at left; and on the Roma Capitale 1,000-lire coin of 1970

The veiled and diademed head of Concordia on a denarius of the gens Aemilia, minted by Lucius Aemilius Lepidus Paullus in 62 BC, was the model for the obverse of Italy's commemorative 1,000-lire coin of 1970, Roma Capitale, designed by the medallist and engraver Laura Cretara.

The asteroid 58 Concordia is named after her.

In modern Discordianism, Harmonians equate Concordia with Aneris. Her opposite in this belief system is thus Discordia, or the Greek Eris.
