= Homonoia (disambiguation) =

Homonoia could mean:

- Homonoia (plant) - a plant genus of the family Euphorbiaceae comprising 2 species.
- Homonoia - the Greek philosophical virtue of achieving agreement, compatibility or likemindedness.
- Homonoia (mythology) - Greek goddess of order and unity
