= Christ Crowned with Thorns (Annibale Carracci) =

Painting by Annibale Carracci

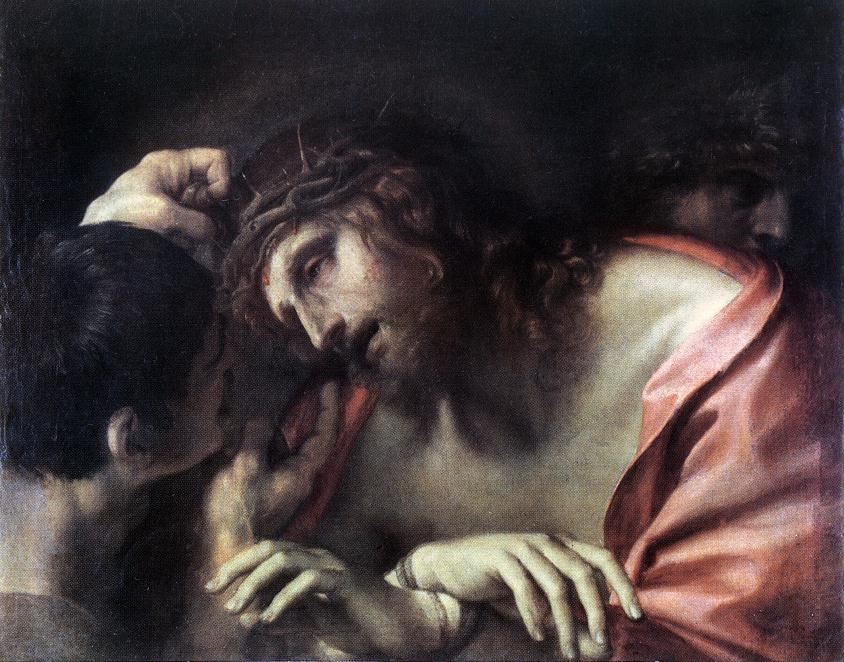
Christ Crowned with Thorns (ca. 1598–1600) by Annibale Carracci

Christ Crowned with Thorns or Christ Mocked is an oil painting on canvas executed ca. 1598–1600 by the Italian Baroque painter Annibale Carracci, now at the Pinacoteca Nazionale di Bologna.

== History ==
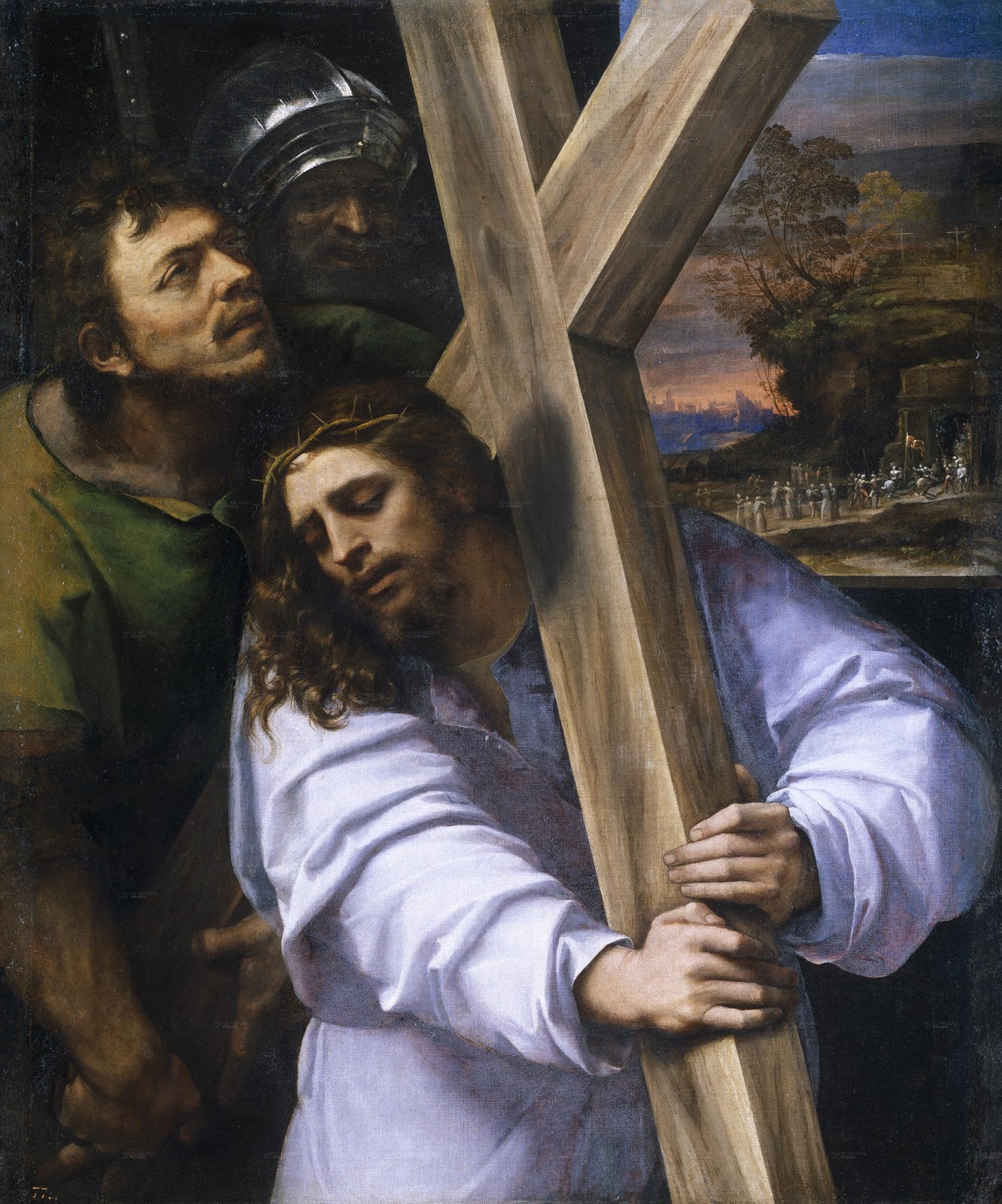
Sebastiano del Piombo, Christ Bearing his Cross, Museo del Prado, Madrid

It is usually identified with a work mentioned by Giulio Mancini in his Considerazioni sulla pittura (1620), in which he refers to the artist painting a "Christ whipped and pulled by the hair for the chapels of the "manigoldi" in the manner of fra Bastiano [i.e. Sebastiano del Piombo]" as an angry riposte to comments from his patron Odoardo Farnese on the superiority of past painters over present ones. Odoardo then saw the work hanging on a wall of the Palazzo Farnese, mistook it for a work by Luciani and stated that it confirmed his previous assertion, to which Annibale immediately replied that the work's artist was by "the grace of God, [still] alive".

It is now attributed to Annibale Carracci, and was probably produced in Rome in 1598–1600, between his work on the Camerino Farnese and his starting work on the Galleria Farnese frescoes.

Like the rest of the Farnese collection, the work moved from Rome to Parma and finally to Naples. At the end of the 18th century, it passed to an English collector before going back on the market and being acquired by the Italian state for its present owner in 1951.

== Dating ==
The dating of the painting is rather controversial. If, following Mancini, it is certain that it was executed in Rome (therefore not before 1595), it is doubtful however at what stage of Annibale's Roman years it dates. The Venetian influence on the work has led some authors to favor an early date, between 1595 and 1596, that is, to Carracci's early Roman career. Others, however, recognizing in Christ Crowned also the fruit of some reflections on Raphael and Caravaggio, postpone it by a few years, to around 1600.

Another anecdote concerns this painting. Bellori narrates that during Annibale's funeral, the Christ Crowned was placed by Antonio Carracci at the head of the catafalque prepared for his uncle's remains.

== Description and style ==
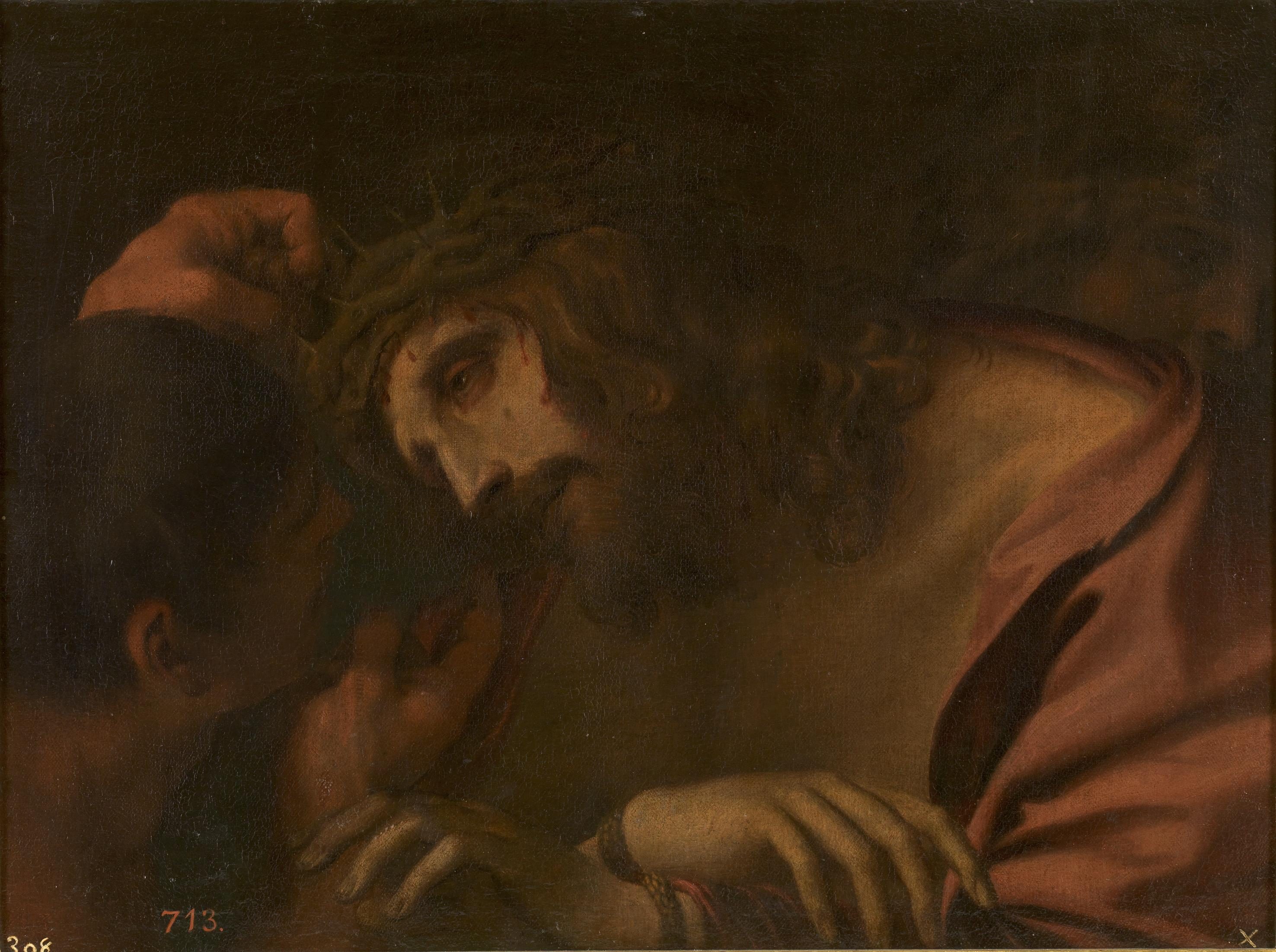
Andrea Sacchi, Christ Crowned with Thorns, Madrid, Museo del Prado

As Mancini observed, the foreground of the composition associates Annibale's Christ Crowned with the famous depictions of Sebastiano del Piombo's Christ Bearing His Cross.

Annibale gave his composition a marked depth of perspective by scaling the three figures appearing on different planes. The small space between Jesus and the torturer lowering the crown of thorns upon his head is filled by the Lord's foreshortened hands, whose position contributes to the painting's three-dimensional effect.

For this reason, Annibale's Christ Crowned (like other works by Carracci that can be dated between the sixteenth and seventeenth centuries) has been compared to Raphael's tactic of giving depth to the pictorial space by using a gesture of the painted figure, an interest that in that same period also occupied Caravaggio.

An echo of Caravaggio's painting, moreover, had already been detected by Cesare Gnudi in the luministic treatment of the painting.

Carracci's painting was widley admired and there are several copies, one of which is by Andrea Sacchi (Prado Museum). The painting was reproduced in engravings, the first of which was by the Florentine Sebastiano Vaiani in 1627. It is one of the earliest prints based on Carracci's works (aside from the very few engraved during the artist's lifetime) and was dedicated to Cardinal Desiderio Scaglia, then Commissioner General of the Holy Inquisition.

The painting also interested Anthony van Dyck who, during his stay in Rome (1622), made a sketch from Annibale's Christ Crowned, included in his famous Italian Notebook.

== Gallery ==
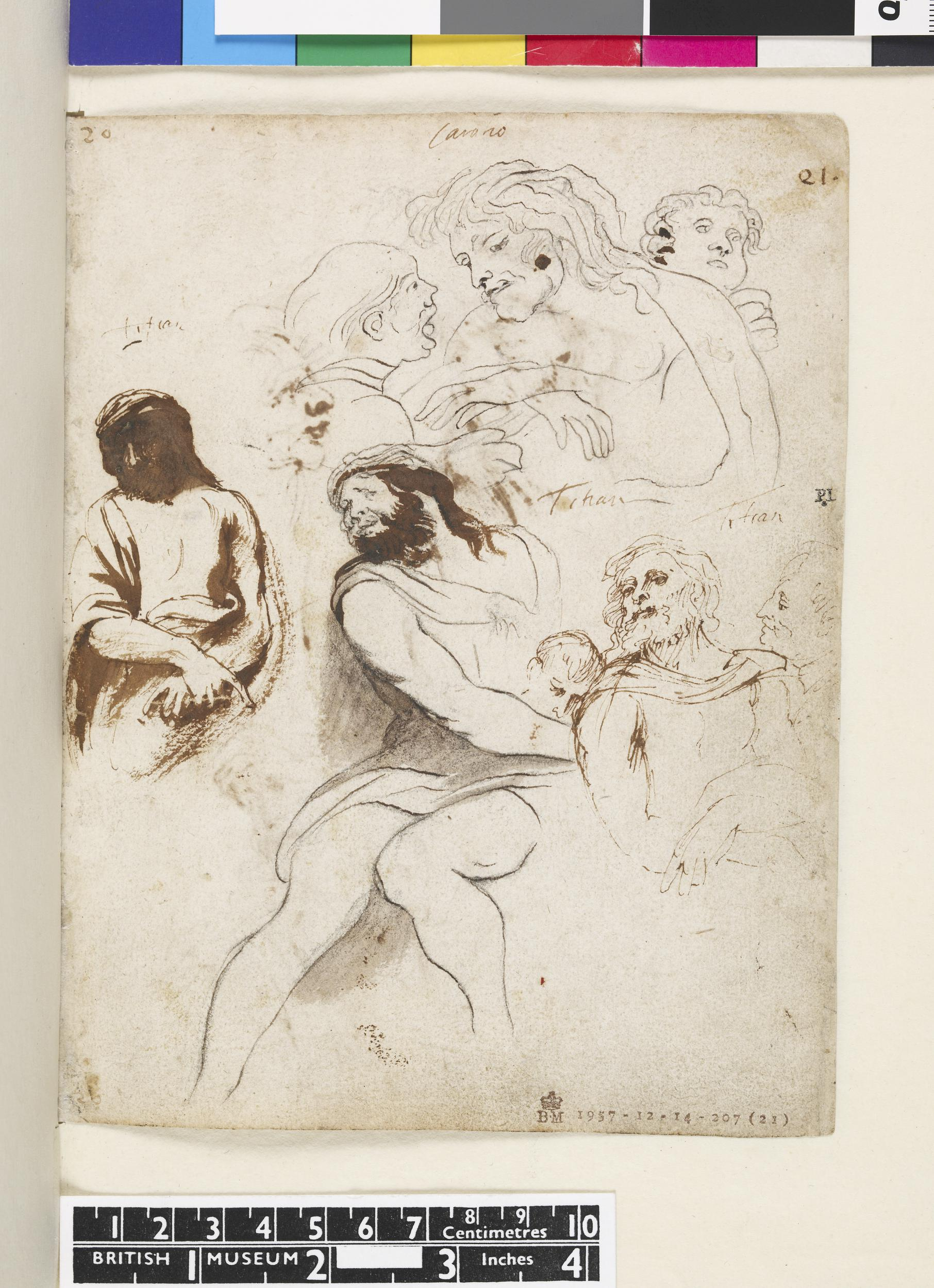
Anthony van Dyck, Italian Notebook, 1621–1627, British Museum. The sketch of Carracci's Christ Crowned with Thorns in at the top of the folio above the study of Titian's Christ Crowned with Thorns (Louvre)

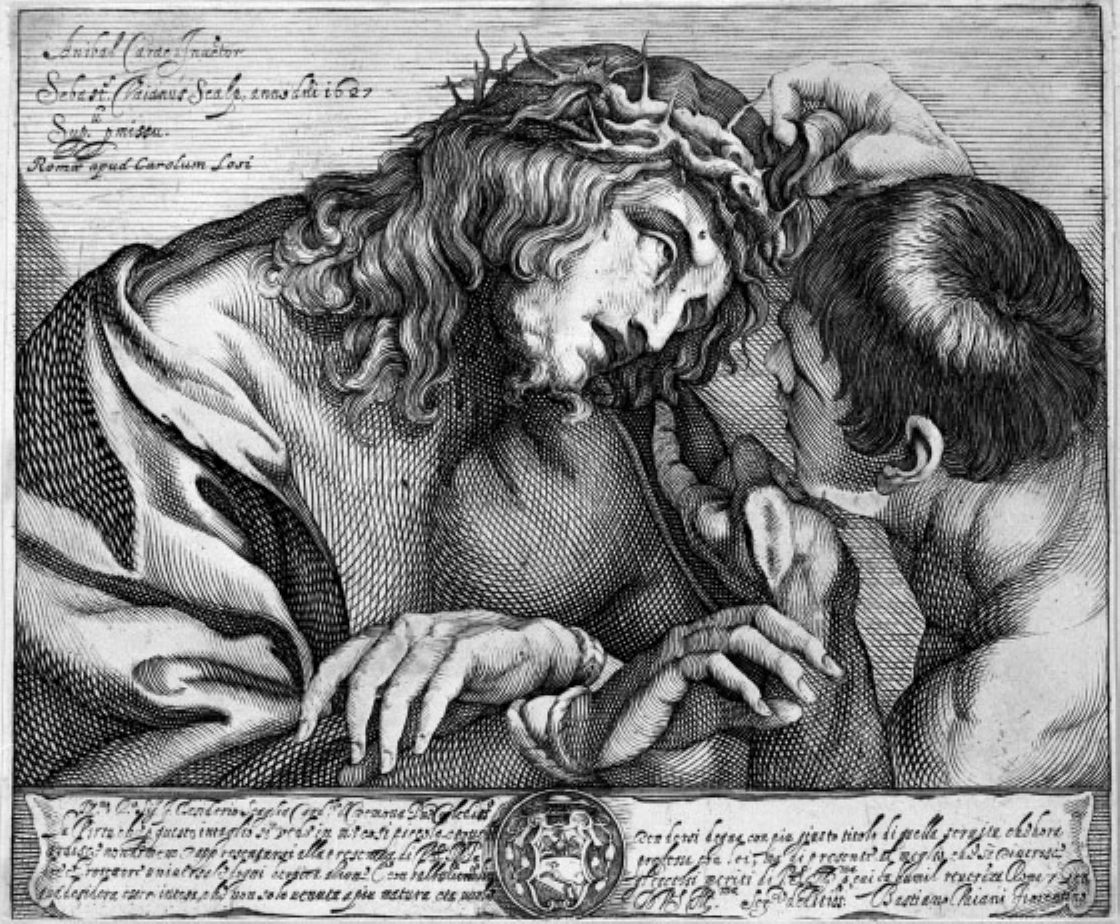
Print of Carracci's work by Sebastiano Vaiani, 1627
