= Arete =

Greek philosophical concept

- Goddess of excellence and virtue
- Member of The Praxidicae
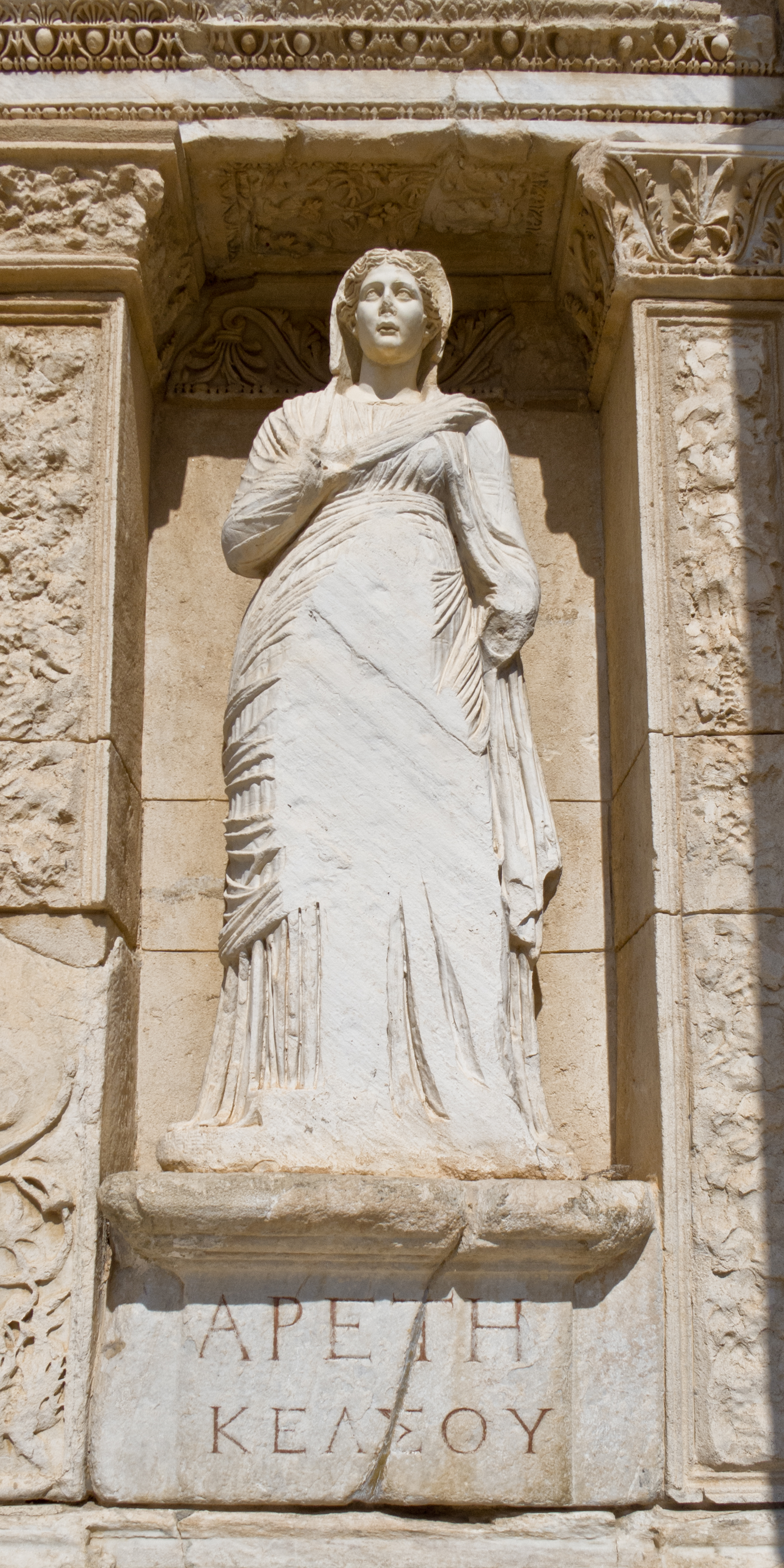
- Modern copy of a 2nd-century statue of Arete in Celsus' Library in Ephesus
- Gender: Female

Genealogy
- Parents: Praxidice and Soter
- Siblings: Homonoia

Equivalents
- Roman: Virtus

Arete (Ancient Greek: ἀρετή, romanized: aretḗ) is a concept in ancient Greek thought that refers to "excellence" of any kind—especially a person or thing's "full realization of potential or inherent function." The term may also refer to excellence in "moral virtue."

The concept was also occasionally personified as a minor goddess, Arete (not to be confused with the mythological Queen Arete), who, together with sister Homonoia, formed the Praxidikai ("Exacters of Justice").

In its earliest appearance in Greek, this notion of excellence was bound up with the notion of the fulfillment of purpose or function: living up to one's potential. A person of arete is of the highest effectiveness; such a person uses all of their faculties—strength, bravery, and wit—to achieve real results. In the Homeric world, arete involves all of the abilities and potentialities available to humans. Though particularly associated with manly qualities, the Homeric usage of the term was not necessarily gender-specific, as Homer applied the term to both the Greek and Trojan heroes as well as major female figures, such as Penelope, the wife of Greek hero Odysseus. In the Homeric poems, arete is frequently associated with bravery, but more often with effectiveness.

In some contexts, arete is explicitly linked with human knowledge, where the expressions "virtue is knowledge" and "arete is knowledge" are used interchangeably. In this sense, the highest human potential is knowledge, and all other human abilities derive from this central capacity. If arete is knowledge, the highest human knowledge is knowledge about knowledge itself. In this light, the theoretical study of human knowledge, which Aristotle called "contemplation", is the highest human ability and happiness.

== History ==
The ancient Greeks applied the term arete (ἀρετή) to anything: for example, the excellence of a chimney, the excellence of a bull for breeding, and the excellence of a man. The meaning of the word changes depending on what it describes since everything has its own excellence; the arete of a man is different from the arete of a horse. This way of thinking originates from Plato, where it can be seen in the Allegory of the Cave. In particular, the aristocratic class was presumed, essentially by definition, to be exemplary of arete:

The root of the word is the same as aristos, the word which shows superlative ability and superiority, and aristos was constantly used in the plural to denote the nobility.

By the 5th and 4th centuries BCE, arete as applied to men had developed to include quieter virtues, such as dikaiosyne (justice) and sophrosyne (self-restraint). Though Plato tried to produce a moral philosophy that incorporated this new usage, it was in the Nicomachean Ethics of Aristotle that the doctrine of arete found its fullest flowering. Aristotle's Doctrine of the Mean is a paradigm example of his thinking.

Aristotle deliberated on the various goals of education: including practical skills, arete, and theory. Educating towards arete means boys would be educated towards things that are useful in life. However, there is no agreement about what constitutes arete, which leads to disagreement about how to train students for arete. To say that arete has a common definition of excellence or fulfillment may be an overstatement simply because it was very difficult to pinpoint arete, much less the proper ways to go about obtaining it.

=== Homer ===
In Homer's Iliad and Odyssey, arete mainly describes heroes and nobles and their mobile dexterity, with special reference to strength and courage, though it is not limited to this. For instance, the excellence of the gods generally included their power, but, in the Odyssey (13.42), Odysseus asked the gods to grant the Phaeacians arete, which here is generally translated as prosperity. Penelope's arete, as another example, relates to co-operation, for which she is praised by Agamemnon. Though associated with manly qualities, the Homeric usage of the term was not necessarily gender-specific, as Homer applied the term to major female figures as well as the Greek and Trojan heroes.

The Odyssey states that "far-sounding Zeus takes away half the arete of a man, when the day of slavery takes hold of him."

In the Iliad, the way Homer describes Achilles is an example of arete. Arete is associated with the goodness and prowess of a warrior. Debra Hawhee points out that the norms and practices of Athenian virtuosity "operate within the politics of reputation, whose normative poles are honor and shame." Dying in battle or securing a victory in the Olympic Games were considered agathos ("good") and, hence, deserving of timê ("honor"). So, not only is Achilles a brave and brilliant warrior but also, from the outset, he is destined to die in battle at Troy with the utmost glory—a guarantor of arete.

According to Bernard Knox's notes in the Robert Fagles' translation of The Odyssey, "arete" is also associated with araomai, the Greek word for "pray".

== Personification ==
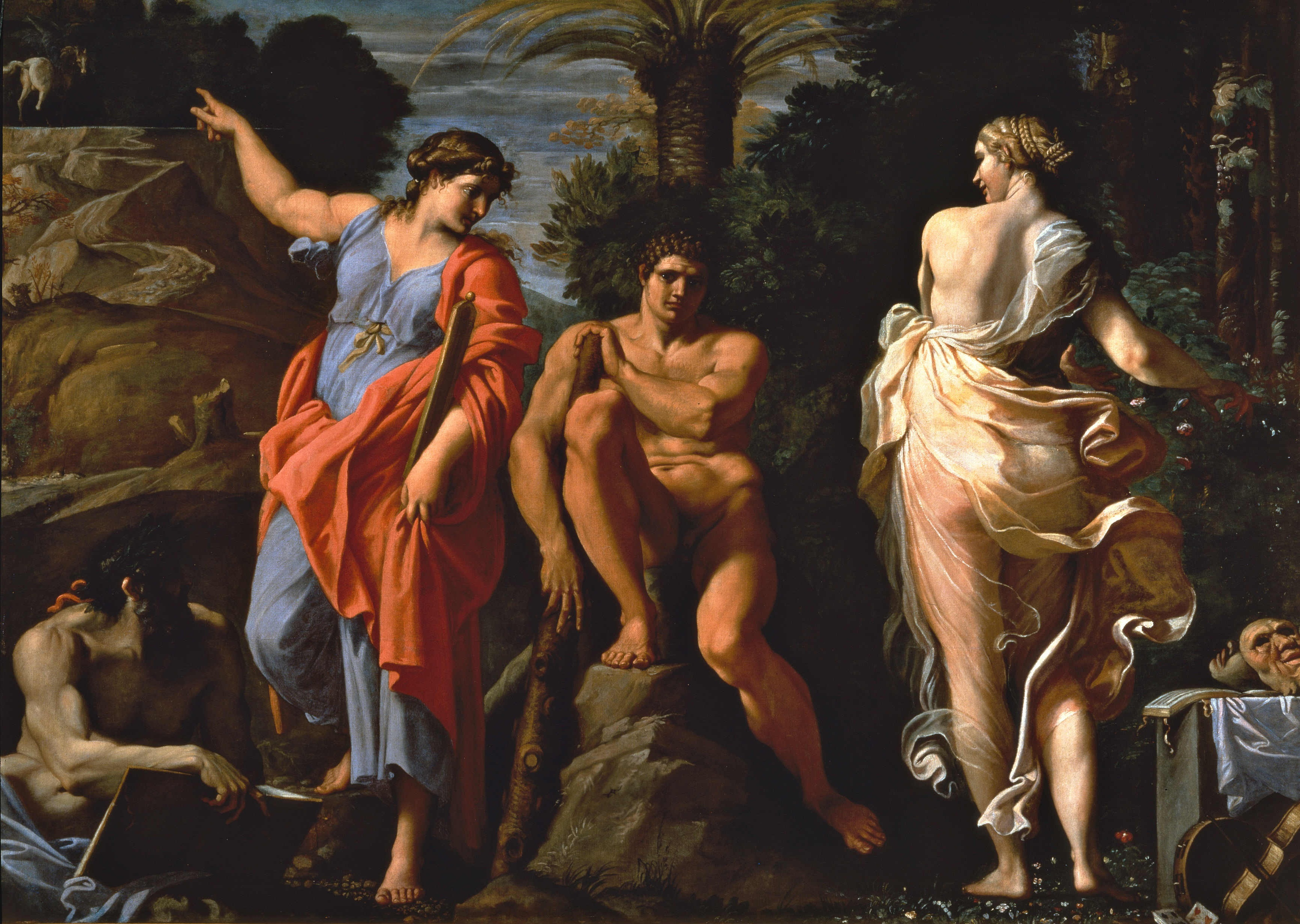
The Choice of Hercules by Carracci, 1596. Depicts Hercules deciding between Vice (right) and Virtue, or Arete (left)

Arete was occasionally personified as a goddess, the sister of Homonoia (goddess of concord, unanimity, and oneness of mind), and the daughter of Praxidike (goddess of justice). Arete and Homonoia were known jointly as the Praxidikai ("Exacters of Justice"). As with many minor Greek deities, there is little or no real mythical background to Arete, who is used at most as a personification of virtue.

The only surviving story involving Arete was told in the 5th century BCE by the sophist Prodicus. Known as "Hercules at the crossroads", it concerns the early life of the hero Heracles. At a crossroads, Arete appeared to Heracles as a young maiden and offered him glory and a life of struggle against evil; her counterpart Kakia (κακία, 'badness') offered him wealth and pleasure. Heracles chose to follow the path of Arete.

This story was later used by Christian writers, such as Methodius of Olympus, Justin Martyr, Clement of Alexandria, and Basil of Caesarea.

== Examples of usage ==
- In Aristotle's Nicomachean Ethics, Book 2, chapter 6: "Virtue (arete), then, is a habit or trained faculty of choice, the characteristic of which lies in moderation or observance of the mean relatively to the persons concerned, as determined by reason, i.e., by the reason by which the prudent man would determine it."
- In the Admonition of Paul in Philippians 4:8: "Finally, brothers and sisters, whatever is true, whatever is honorable, whatever is just, whatever is pure, whatever is pleasing, whatever is commendable, if there is any excellence (arete) and if there is anything worthy of praise, think about these things."
- Robert Pirsig uses "arete" as a synonym for "quality" in his book Zen and the Art of Motorcycle Maintenance, which includes an extensive discussion of Plato's Phaedrus and the historical contrast between Dialectic and Rhetoric: "And what is good, Phaedrus, And what is not good—Need we ask anyone to tell us these things?" Pirsig's line plays off a line in the Platonic dialogue The Phaedrus which reads: "And what is well and what is badly—need we ask Lysias, or any other poet or orator, who ever wrote or will write either a political or any other work, in metre or out of metre, poet or prose writer, to teach us this?"
- In a Pindarian ode inscribed on the base of an Olympian victor's statue for the boxer Diagoras of Rhodes: "O father Zeus, give honor to this hymn for a victor at Olympia, and to his now famous arete in boxing."
- Arete is the name of a key protagonist in The Philosopher Kings, the second book of Jo Walton's Thessaly trilogy in which a group of people gathered by the time-traveling goddess Athena work to achieve the ideal society as described in Plato's Republic. She is a precocious teenager who also appears in the sequel. Arete's name and its meaning ("excellence") is a small but important plot point in the book—as well as a general theme of the series as a whole.
- In the tabletop role-playing game Mage: The Ascension, arete is the term used to quantify a mage's power and ability to influence the world around them with their magical force of will.

=== Athletics ===
Arete was also used by Plato in his discussion of athletic training and the education of young boys. It was commonly believed that the mind, body, and soul each had to be developed for a man to live a life of arete. This led to the thought that athletics had to be present in order to obtain arete. Athletics did not need to occupy one's life, but could be used to exercise the body into the right condition for arete, just as the mind and soul would be exercised by other means.

=== Paideia ===
Arete is a significant part of the paideia of ancient Greeks: the training of the boy to manhood. This training in arete included physical training, for which the Greeks developed the gymnasion; mental training, which included oratory, rhetoric, and basic sciences; and spiritual training, which included music and what is called virtue.

== See also ==
- Aretaic turn – Normative ethical theories
- Aretology – Narrative about a divine figure
- Maturity (psychological) – Learned ability to respond to the environment in a socially appropriate manner
- Mens sana in corpore sano – Latin phrase regarding health ("a healthy mind in a healthy body")
- Pirsig's metaphysics of Quality – Theory of reality
- Virtue ethics – Normative ethical theories
- Virtus – Masculine virtue in Ancient Rome
- Charites – Greek goddesses of grace and beauty
