= Cacia (disambiguation) =

Cacia is a civil parish in Aveiro Municipality, Portugal.

Cacia may also refer to:

- Cacia (beetle), a genus of insects
- Daniele Cacia (born 1983), an Italian football striker
- Cacia, or Kakia (mythology), Greek spirit of vice and sister of Arete
