= Susan Gritton =

English operatic soprano

Susan Gritton (born 31 August 1965) is an English operatic soprano. She was the 1994 winner of the Kathleen Ferrier Award and has sung leading roles in a wide-ranging repertoire from Handel and Mozart to Britten, Janáček and Strauss.

== Life and career ==
Gritton was born in Reigate, Surrey. She was educated at the University of Oxford and the University of London, where she studied Botany. She sang with the Clerkes of Oxenford, Monteverdi Choir and Hanover Band Chorus. Early on, she was inspired by the singing of Lucia Popp on The Cunning Little Vixen recording conducted by Charles Mackerras.

On the operatic stage, her roles include Ellen Orford in Peter Grimes (La Scala, Sydney and Tokyo); Blanche in Dialogues des Carmélites (Bayerische Staatsoper); Countess Madeleine in Capriccio and Tatyana in Eugene Onegin (Grange Park); Micaela in Carmen and Liù in Turandot (Covent Garden); Donna Anna in Don Giovanni (Bolshoi, Opéra de Montreal and Scottish Opera); Elettra in Idomeneo (Netherlands Opera) and Konstanze in Die Entführung aus dem Serail (Deutsche Staatsoper and Bayerische Staatsoper). Title roles include Theodora (Glyndebourne), Rodelinda (Bayerische Staatsoper), The Bartered Bride (Covent Garden), and The Cunning Little Vixen (ENO).

On the concert platform her work spans many periods and styles and includes Ravel's Shéhérazade (RLPO/Mackerras); Brahms' Ein Deutsches Requiem (Berlin Philharmonic/Rattle & Philharmonia/von Dohnànyi); Berg's Bruchstücke aus Wozzeck (Swedish Radio Orchestra/Harding) and Honegger's Jeanne d'Arc au bûcher (Accademia Nazionale di Santa Cecilia/Pappano). Other highlights include Handel's Messiah (ROH Orchestra/Pappano); Elgar's The Kingdom (LSO/Elder); Shostakovich's Blok Romances (Nash Ensemble); Schumann's Das Paradies und die Peri at the Edinburgh Festival (SCO/Norrington) and in Vienna (Vienna Philharmonic/Rattle) and Britten's Les Illuminations – including the world premiere of Britten's three additional Rimbaud settings (BBCSSO/Brabbins). A Grammy-nominated artist, she has recorded prolifically for Chandos, Hyperion, Deutsche Grammophon, EMI, Decca, Philips and Collins Classics among others.

Gritton had no formal "British college or conservatoire training". She is married to the opera director Stephen Medcalf.

== Roles ==
- Barbarina in Mozart's The Marriage of Figaro at Glyndebourne Festival Opera
- Blanche in Poulenc's Dialogues des Carmélites at Bayerische Staatsoper
- Cleopatra in Handel's Giulio Cesare at Bayerische Staatsoper
- Contessa in Mozart's The Marriage of Figaro at English National Opera
- Donna Anna in Mozart's Don Giovanni at Bolshoi, Opera de Montreal, Scottish Opera
- Ellen Orford in Britten's Peter Grimes at La Scala, Sydney, Tokyo
- Elettra in Mozart's Idomeneo at Netherlands Opera
- Female Chorus in Britten's The Rape of Lucretia at Snape Maltings
- Fiordiligi in Mozart's Così fan tutte at Mostly Mozart Festival, English National Opera, Bayerische Staatsoper
- Governess in Britten's The Turn of the Screw at Snape Maltings
- Konstanze in Mozart's Die Entführung aus dem Serail at Berlin State Opera, Bayerische Staatsoper
- Liù in Puccini's Turandot at the Royal Opera House
- Madeleine in Richard Strauss's Capriccio at Grange Park Opera
- Marenka in Smetana's The Bartered Bride at the Royal Opera House
- Marzelline in Beethoven's Fidelio at Teatro dell'Opera di Roma
- Micaela in Bizet's Carmen at the Royal Opera House
- Pamina in Mozart's The Magic Flute at English National Opera
- Rodelinda in Handel's Rodelinda at Bayerische Staatsoper
- Romilda in Handel's Xerxes at Bayerische Staatsoper
- Theodora in Handel's Theodora at Glyndebourne Festival Opera
- Tatyana in Tchaikovsky's Eugene Onegin at Grange Park Opera
- Tytania in Britten's A Midsummer Night's Dream at Teatro la Fenice
- Vitellia in Mozart's La clemenza di Tito at Bayerische Staatsoper
- Vixen in Janáček's The Cunning Little Vixen at English National Opera
- Miss Wordsworth in Britten's Albert Herring at Glyndebourne Festival Opera

== Discography ==
- Beethoven, Ah perfido!, London Chamber Orchestra, Christopher Warren-Green (Signum)
- Beethoven, 9th Symphony, BBC National Orchestra of Wales, François-Xavier Roth (BBC Music Magazine Vol. 16, No. 7)
- Beethoven, Vestas Feuer, Sir Andrew Davis (Deutsche Grammophon, Beethoven Edition Vol. 3)
- Berlioz, Béatrice et Bénédict (Hero), London Symphony Orchestra, Sir Colin Davis (LSO LIVE)
- Brahms, Ein Deutsches Requiem, Choir of King's College Cambridge, Stephen Cleobury (EMI)
- Brian, Gothic Symphony, BBC National Orchestra of Wales, etc. Martyn Brabbins (Hyperion)
- Britten, Albert Herring (Miss Wordsworth),Northern Sinfonia, Stuart Bedford (Naxos)
- Britten, Les Illuminations, BBC Symphony Orchestra, Edward Gardner (Chandos
- Britten, Paul Bunyan (Tiny), Royal Opera House Chorus & Orchestra, Richard Hickox (Chandos)
- Britten's Purcell Realizations, Graham Johnson, piano (Hyperion)
- Britten, The Poet's Echo, Iain Burnside, piano (Signum)
- Britten, Sechs Hölderlin-Fragmente, Iain Burnside, piano (Signum)
- Elgar etc. Her Song, BBC Concert Orchestra, Martyn Brabbins (Dutton)
- Elgar, The Spirit of England, BBC Symphony Orchestra, David Lloyd Jones (Dutton)
- Finzi, Dies natalis, BBC Symphony Orchestra, Edward Gardner (Chandos)
- Gluck, Paride ed Elena (Elena) Gabrielli Consort & Players, Paul McCreesh (Deutsche Grammophon)
- Górecki, Symphony No. 3, Philharmonic Orchestra, Yuri Simonov (Regis)
- Handel, L'Allegro, il Penseroso ed il Moderato, The King's Consort, Robert King (Hyperion)
- Handel, The Choice of Hercules (Pleasure), The King's Consort, Robert King (Hyperion)
- Handel, Deborah (Jael), The King's Consort, Robert King (Hyperion)
- Handel, Israel in Egypt, King's College Choir, Stephen Cleobury (Decca)
- Handel, Messiah, Gabrielli Consort & Players, Paul McCreesh (Deustsche Grammophon)
- Handel, Messiah, LSO, Sir Colin Davis (LSO Live)
- Handel, Messiah, Ensemble Matheus, Jean-Christophe Spinosi (DVD, Unitel Classic)
- Handel, Occasional Oratorio, The King's Consort, Robert King (Hyperion)
- Handel, Saul (Merab), Gabrielli Consort & Players, Paul McCreesh (Deustsche Grammophon)
- Handel, Solomon (Queen of Sheba), Gabrielli Consort & Players, Paul McCreesh (Deustsche Grammophon)
- Handel, Solomon (Solomon's Queen, First Harlot), Berlin RIAS Chamber Chorus, Daniel Reuss (Harmonia Mundi)
- Handel, Theodora (Theodora), Gabrielli Consort & Players, Paul McCreesh (Deutsche Grammophon)
- Toivo Kuula, Orchestral Songs BBC Concert Orchestra, Martyn Brabbins (Dutton Epoch)
- Medtner, Goethe Lieder, Geoffrey Tozer, piano (Chandos)
- Fanny Mendelssohn, Lieder, Eugene Asti, piano (Hyperion)
- Felix Mendelssohn, Paulus, BBC National Orchestra, Richard Hickox (Chandos)
- Mozart, Exsultate, jubilate, St John's Sinfonia, Andrew Nethsingha (Chandos)
- Mozart, Porgi amor, Dove sono, London Chamber Orchestra, Christopher Warren-Green (Signum)
- Mozart, Requiem, Scottish Chamber Orchestra, Sir Charles Mackerras (Linn)
- Mozart, Ruhe sanft, meine holdes Leben, Classical Opera Company, Ian Page (Sony)
- Poulenc, Dialogues des Carmelites (Blanche), Bayerisches Staatsorchester, Kent Nagano (DVD, Bel Air Classics
- Poulenc, Gloria Polyphony, Britten Sinfonia, Stephen Layton (Hyperion)
- Schubert Mass in E flat major (D 950), Collegium Musicum 90, Richard Hickox (Chandos)
- Smetana The Bartered Bride (Marenka), Philarmonia, Sir Charles Mackerras (Chandos)
- Shostakovich, Seven Romances on Poems by Alexander Blok Florestan Trio (Hyperion)
- Verdi Falstaff (Nanetta), English National Opera Orchestra, Paul Daniel (Chandos)
- Vaughan Williams, A Sea Symphony, LSO, Richard Hickox (Chandos)
- Vaughan Williams, Sir John in Love (Anne Page), Northern Sinfonia, Richard Hickox (Chandos)
- Vivaldi, Ottone in Villa (Cleonilla), Collegium Musicum 90, Richard Hickox (Hyperion)

== Prizes and awards ==
- 1994: Kathleen Ferrier Award
- 2003: International Handel Recording Prize for Handel's The Choice of Hercules
- 2003: Gramophone Award for Johann Nepomuk Hummel, Masses
