= Peitharchia =

Personification of obedience in Greek mythology

In Greek mythology, Peitharchia (Ancient Greek: Πειθαρχία) was the personification of obedience.

== Mythology ==
According to Aeschylus, Peitharchia was the wife of Soter and mother of Eupraxia.

When you invoke the gods, do not be ill-advised. For Peitharkhia (Obedience) is the mother of Eupraxia (Success), wife of Soter (Salvation)--as the saying goes. So she is, but the power of god Zeus is supreme, and often in bad times it raises the helpless man out of harsh misery even when stormclouds are lowering over his eyes.
