= The Choice of Hercules (Handel) =

Musical composition by George Frideric Handel

- Oratorio by George Frideric Handel
- Handel portrayed by Balthasar Denner, 1729
- Catalogue: HWV 69
- Year: 1750
- Text: derived from The Judgement of Hercules by Robert Lowth
- Language: English
- Based on: Choice of Hercules
- Performed: 1 March 1751: London Royal Opera House
- Movements: 24

The Choice of Hercules (HWV 69) is an oratorio in one act (three scenes) by George Frideric Handel. Handel produced the score between 28 June and 5 July 1750. The first performance was given on 1 March 1751 at the Covent Garden Theatre, London with Cecilia Young as Virtue, Isabella Young as Hercules, and Thomas Lowe as attendant. The libretto is derived from the poem (1743) of Robert Lowth but revised, probably, by Thomas Morell.

The story centres on the Choice of Hercules, in which the youthful Hercules must decide between the paths of pleasure and virtue. These are represented by two women who present their various arguments to Hercules, and his confusion is articulated in the trio Where shall I go?. The classical myth of "the choice of Hercules," as told by the 5th-century Athenian sophist Prodicus (Xenophon Memorabilia 2.1.21-34), anticipates that Hercules will choose to follow Virtue's path. And, indeed, the Chorus sings ( Chorus, 24) that "Virtue will place thee in that blest abode, Crown'd with immortal youth, Among the gods a god!"

The character of The Attendant on Pleasure is introduced into this version of the Choice of Hercules and complicates Hercules' choice (Air, 16).

A typical performance takes almost 50 minutes.

The work includes the notable aria Yet can I hear that dulcet lay.

== Dramatis personae ==
- Hercules (alto)
- Pleasure (soprano)
- Virtue (alto)
- An Attendant on Pleasure (tenor)
- Chorus

== Movements ==
The work has the following movements:

| Movement | Type | Character | Text |
|---|---|---|---|
| 1 | Sinfonia | | |
| 2 | Accompagnato | Pleasure | See Hercules! how smiles yon myrtle plain |
| 3 | Air | Pleasure | Come, blooming boy |
| 4 | Air | Pleasure | There the brisk sparkling nectar drain |
| 5 | Solo and Chorus | Pleasure | While for thy arms that beauty glows |
| 6 | Recitative | Virtue | Away, mistaken wretch, away! |
| 7 | Air | Virtue | This manly youth's exalted mind |
| 8 | Recitative | Virtue | Rise, youth! exalt thyself and me |
| 9 | Air | Virtue | Go, assert thy heav'nly race |
| 10 | Recitative | Virtue | In peace, in war |
| 11 | Solo and Chorus | Virtue | So shalt thou gain immortal praise |
| 12 | Recitative | Pleasure | Hearst thou, what dangers then thou must engage? |
| 13 | Solo and Chorus | Pleasure | Turn thee, youth, to joy and love |
| 14 | Recitative | Pleasure and Hercules | Short is my way, fair, easy, smooth and plain |
| 15 | Air | Hercules | Yet, can I hear that dulcet lay |
| 16 | Air | Attendant on Pleasure | Enjoy the sweet Elysian grove |
| 17 | Recitative | Hercules | Oh! whither, reason, dost thou fly? |
| 18 | Trio | Hercules, Pleasure and Virtue | Where shall I go? |
| 19 | Recitative | Virtue | Mount, mount the steep ascent |
| 20 | Air | Virtue | Mount, mount the steep ascent |
| 21 | Chorus | | Arise! mount the steep ascent |
| 22 | Recitative | Hercules | The sounds breathe fire |
| 23 | Air | Hercules | Lead, goddess, lead the way! |
| 24 | Chorus | | Virtue will place thee in that blest abode |

== Recordings ==
Hyperion Records label received the 2003 International Handel Recording Prize for their recording of The Choice of Hercules.

- Conductor: Robert King
- Pleasure: Susan Gritton
- Virtue: Alice Coote
- Hercules: Robin Blaze
- An Attendant on Pleasure: Charles Daniels
- The Choir of The King's Consort
- The King's Consort
