= Aretalogy =

Narrative about a divine figure

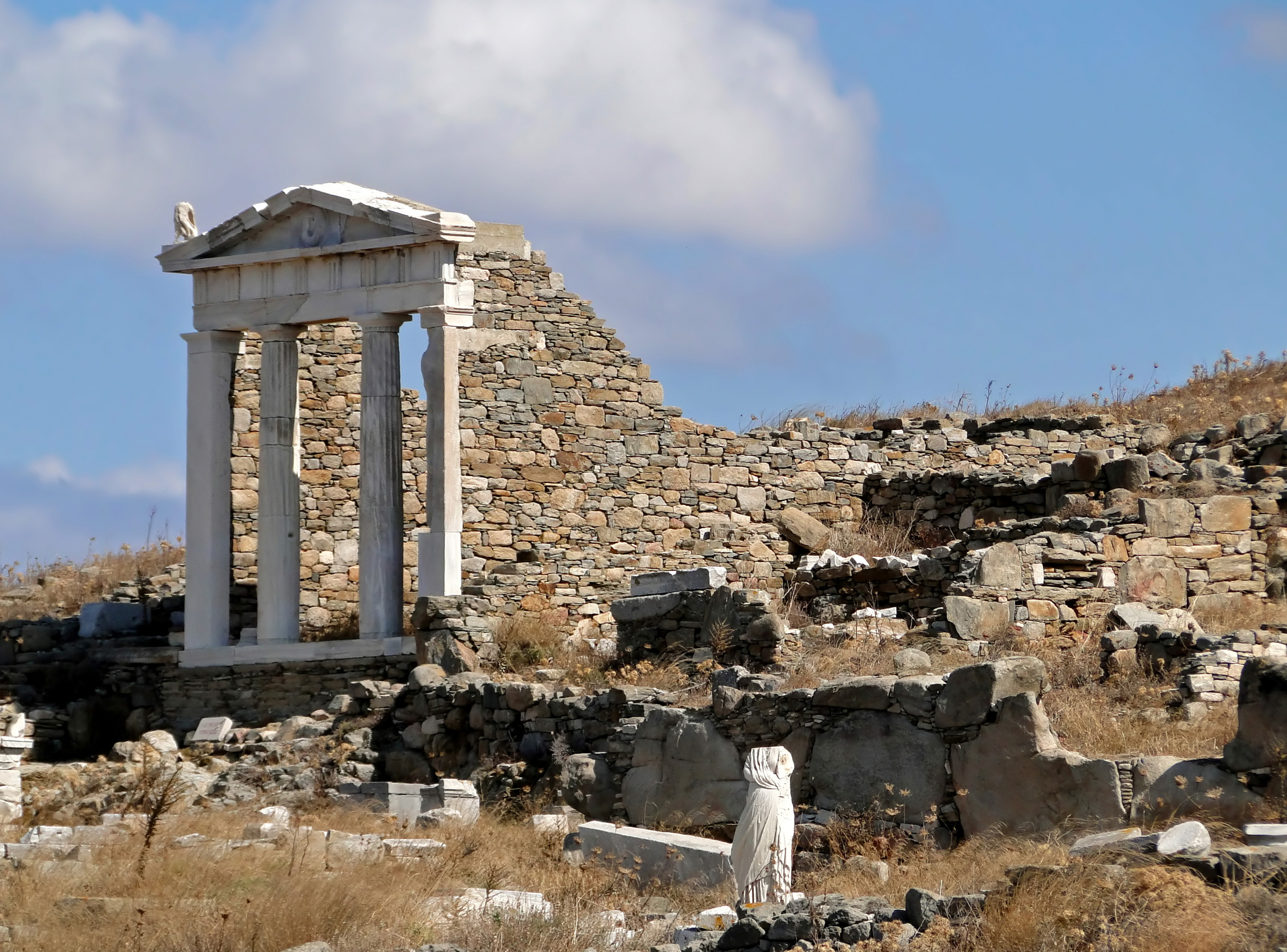
Temple of Isis in Delos, Greece

An aretalogy (Greek: Αρεταλογία), from ἀρετή (aretḗ, “virtue”) + -logy, or aretology (from ancient Greek aretê, "excellence, virtue") in the strictest sense is a narrative about a divine figure's miraculous deeds where a deity's attributes are listed, in the form of poem or text, in the first person. The equivalent term in Sanskrit is ātmastuti. There is no evidence that these narratives constituted a clearly defined genre but there exists a body of literature that contained praise for divine miracles. These literary works were usually associated with eastern cults.

== Usage ==
Often each line starts with the standard "I am …". Usually, aretalogies are self praising. They are found in the sacred texts of later Egypt, Mesopotamia and in Greco-Roman times. Aretalogies of Isis would be recited every day by an aretalogist who would have to memorise a huge list of attributes which they would have to recite (Priests and priestesses of Isis had equal rank in the temple). The aretalogies of ancient Egypt provide some the most complete information extant about their deities. Aretalogies are found as early as the Coffin Texts. In a Ptolemaic aretalogy, Isis says about herself:

I am Isis, ruler of every land.
I was taught by Hermes (Thoth) and with Hermes devised letters, both hieroglyphic and demotic, that all might not be written with the same.
I gave laws to mankind and ordained what no one can change.

In the Greco-Roman world, aretologies represent a religious branch of rhetoric and are a prose development of the hymn as praise poetry. Asclepius, Isis, and Serapis are among the deities with surviving aretologies in the form of inscriptions and papyri. The earliest records of divine acts emerged from cultic hymns for these deities, were inscribed in stones, and displayed in temples. The Greek aretologos (ἀρετολόγος, "virtue-speaker") was a temple official who recounted aretologies and may have also interpreted dreams.

By extension, an aretology is also a "catalogue of virtues" belonging to a person; for example, Cicero's list and description of the virtues of Pompeius Magnus ("Pompey the Great") in the speech Pro Lege Manilia. Aretology became part of the Christian rhetorical tradition of hagiography.

In an even more expanded sense, aretology is moral philosophy which deals with virtue, its nature, and the means of arriving at it. It is the title of an ethical tract by Robert Boyle published in the 1640s. Other scholars also consider wisdom literature to fall under the heading of aretology.

== See also ==
- Arete (moral virtue)
- Virtue ethics
