= Soter (daimon) =

Greek daimon of safety

In Greek mythology, Soter (Ancient Greek: Σωτήρ means 'saviour, deliverer') was the personification or daimon of safety, preservation and deliverance from harm.

== Mythology ==
=== Suda ===
Suidas makes him the brother and husband of Praxidike and by her the father of Ktesios, Arete and Homonoia. (Note that both Soter and Ktesios were also cult titles of Zeus).

Praxidike (Exacter of Justice): A deity whose head alone is venerated. Mnaseas in his treatise On Europe says that Soter (Saviour) and his sister Praxidike (Exacter of Justice) had a son Ctesius (Household) and daughters Homonoia (Concord) and Arete (Virtue), who were called Praxidikai (Exacters of Penalties) after their mother.

=== Orphic Hymn ===
In the Orphic Hymns, Praxidike was identified with Persephone, Soter with Zeus, and their daughters Praxidikai with the Erinyes.

=== Aeschylus' account ===
According to Aeschylus, Soter was the husband of Peitharchia and father of Eupraxia.

When you invoke the gods, do not be ill-advised. For Peitharkhia (Obedience) is the mother of Eupraxia (Success), wife of Soter (Salvation)--as the saying goes. So she is, but the power of god Zeus is supreme, and often in bad times it raises the helpless man out of harsh misery even when stormclouds are lowering over his eyes.

== Soteria ==
Soteria (Σωτηρία), personification of the abstract concept of safety and salvation, was also worshipped by the Greeks. She had a sanctuary in Patrae, which was believed to have been founded by Eurypylos of Thessaly.
