= Phthonus =

Deity in Greek mythology

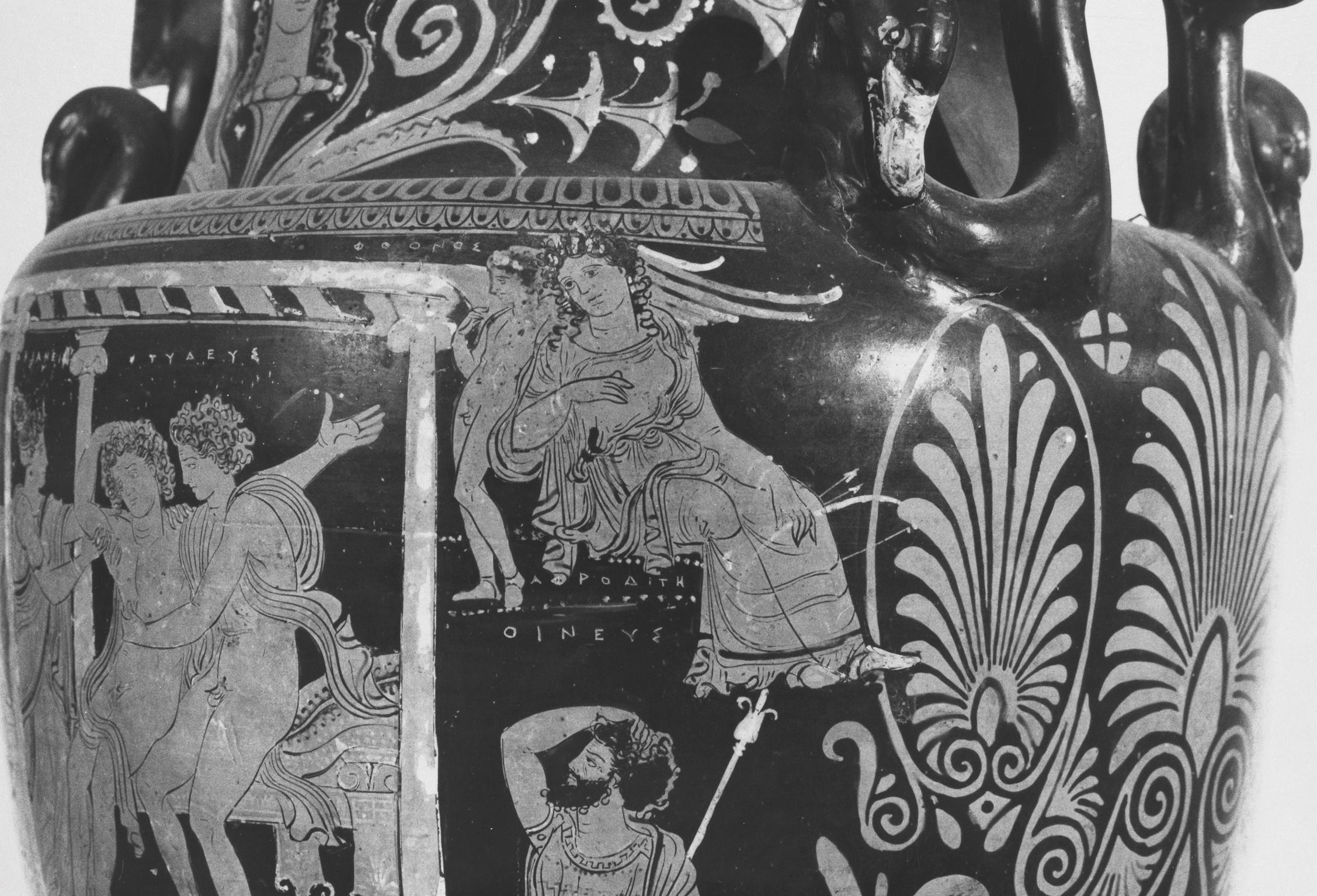
Phthonus and Aphrodite on an vase painting from Armento, c. 375–350 BC.

In Greek mythology, Phthonus (/ˈθoʊnəs/; Ancient Greek: Φθόνος Phthónos), or sometimes Zelus, was the personification of jealousy and envy, most prominently in matters of romance. In Nonnus's Dionysiaca, he is by proxy the cause of Semele's death, having informed Hera of Zeus's affair with the princess. He also appears in Callimachus's Hymn to Apollo, goading the god into an argument. (Note: Callimachus, Hymn 2.105–113.) He is often compared and linked to the goddess of chaos and discord, Éris, for always causing the same effects as the goddess, using and abusing jealousy and envy to create fights between everyone. Furthermore, they are both Daemons.

His female counterpart was Nemesis, personification of revenge. In contrast to Phthonus’ domain being closely tied to romantic and sexual jealousy, Nemesis was more closely related to violent retribution.

This deity, already envious of Dionysus before his birth, incited jealousy in Athena by displaying an image of Ares clad in fake blood-drenched armor. (Note: Nonnus of Panopolis, Dionysiaca 8.34–49.) Additionally, this provoked Hera’s envy, leading her to seek another celestial spouse as she suspected Zeus would remain with Semele. (Note: Nonnus of Panopolis, Dionysiaca 8.50–60.) The deity persisted in provoking Hera and Athena, recalling Zeus’s various affairs and foretelling heroic feats for Dionysus.

According to Irenaeus, Gnostics believed that the first angel and Authadia conceived the children Kakia (wickedness), Zelos (emulation), Phthonus (envy), Erinnys (fury), and Epithymia (lust). (Note: Irenaeus, Against Heresies 1.29.4, in Ante-Nicene Fathers 1.)
