= Hercules at the crossroads =

Ancient Greek anecdote of choice between vice or virtue

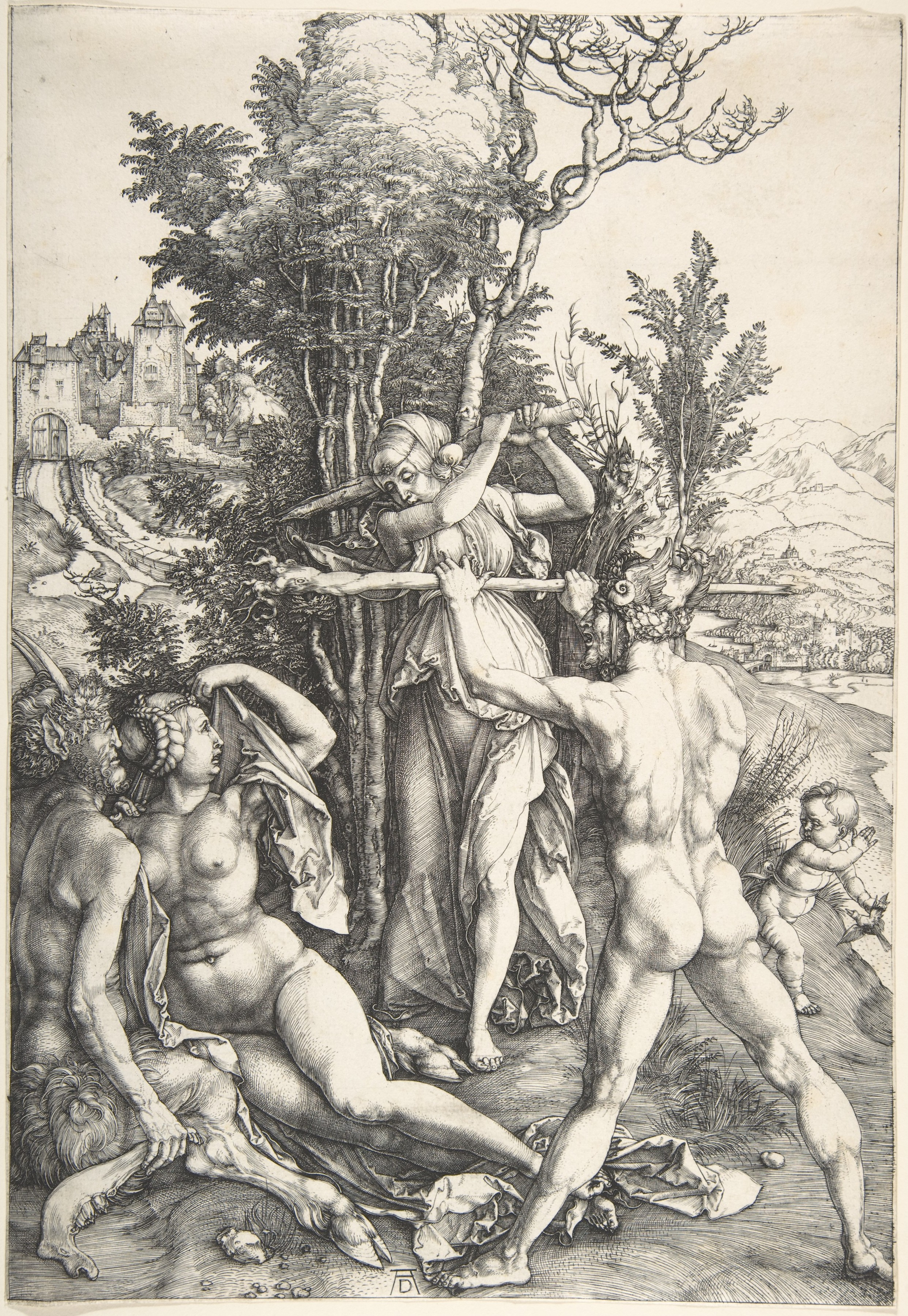
Albrecht Dürer's Hercules at the Crossroads (1498): Hercules and Virtue on the right attack Vice who reclines with a satyr on the left.

Hercules at the crossroads, also known as the Choice of Hercules and the Judgement of Hercules, is an ancient Greek parable attributed to Prodicus and known from Xenophon. It concerns the young Heracles (also known to the Romans as Hercules) who is offered a choice between Vice (Kakia) and Virtue (Arete)—a life of pleasure or one of hardship and honour. In the early modern period it became a popular motif in Western art.

== History ==
=== Classical period ===
The parable stems from the Classical era of ancient Greece and is reported by Xenophon in Memorabilia 2.1.21–34. In Xenophon's text, Socrates tells how the young Heracles, as the hero contemplates his future, is visited by two allegorical figures, female personifications of Vice and Virtue (Ancient Greek: Κακία and Ἀρετή; Kakía and Areté). They offer him a choice between a pleasant and easy life or a severe but glorious life, and present their respective arguments. Xenophon credits the invention of the parable to Prodicus. He cites a precursor in Hesiod's Works and Days, which also contrasts the paths of vice and virtue.

The motif then appears in a number of works by ancient Greek and Roman writers. Aristophanes used it in a humorous way in the comedy The Birds, where Heracles has to choose between kingship and a tasty meal, and almost chooses the meal. In book 15 of the epic poem Punica by Silius Italicus, the military commander Scipio Africanus appears in a situation modeled on the choice of Heracles. The literary device of a contest in dialogue appears within many different genres throughout the literature of ancient Greece. It is related to the controversy stories in the Gospel of Matthew.

=== Early modern period ===
In the Renaissance the story of Hercules at the crossroads became popular again, and it remained so in Baroque and Neoclassical culture. It became a part of the broader motif of psychomachia: the battle of spirits or soul war. Petrarch used it in De vita solitaria (1346) and established it in the mainstream of Renaissance humanism as a figure of the choice between a contemplative life and an active life. Petrarch had read Cicero's summary of the story in De Officiis. Like Xenophon, Cicero stresses the hero's solitude as he deliberates with himself. Four decades after Petrarch's adaptation, Coluccio Salutati reintroduced the original moral choice between Virtus and Voluptas, using Cicero's Latin words.

Famous examples from the visual arts include Albrecht Dürer's print Hercules at the Crossroads (1498), Paolo Veronese's Allegory of Virtue and Vice (1565), Annibale Carracci's The Choice of Hercules (1596), Gerard de Lairesse's Hercules between Virtue and Vice (1685) and Mariano Salvador Maella's mural in the Royal Palace of Madrid, Hercules between Virtue and Vice (1765–66). The story appears in musical compositions such as Laßt uns sorgen, laßt uns wachen by Johann Sebastian Bach and The Choice of Hercules by George Frideric Handel.

== See also ==
- Matthew 7:13
- Virtù
- The Wayfarer
