= Eupraxia (mythology) =

Personification of well-being in Greek mythology

In Greek mythology, Eupraxia (Ancient Greek: Εὐπραξίας means 'good conduct') was the personification of well-being. According to Aeschylus, Eupraxia was the daughter of another two personifications, Peitharchia and Soter.

"When you invoke the gods, do not be ill-advised. For Peitharkhia (Obedience) is the mother of Eupraxia (Success), wife of Soter (Salvation)—as the saying goes."
