= The Choice of Hercules (Carracci) =

Painting by Annibale Carracci

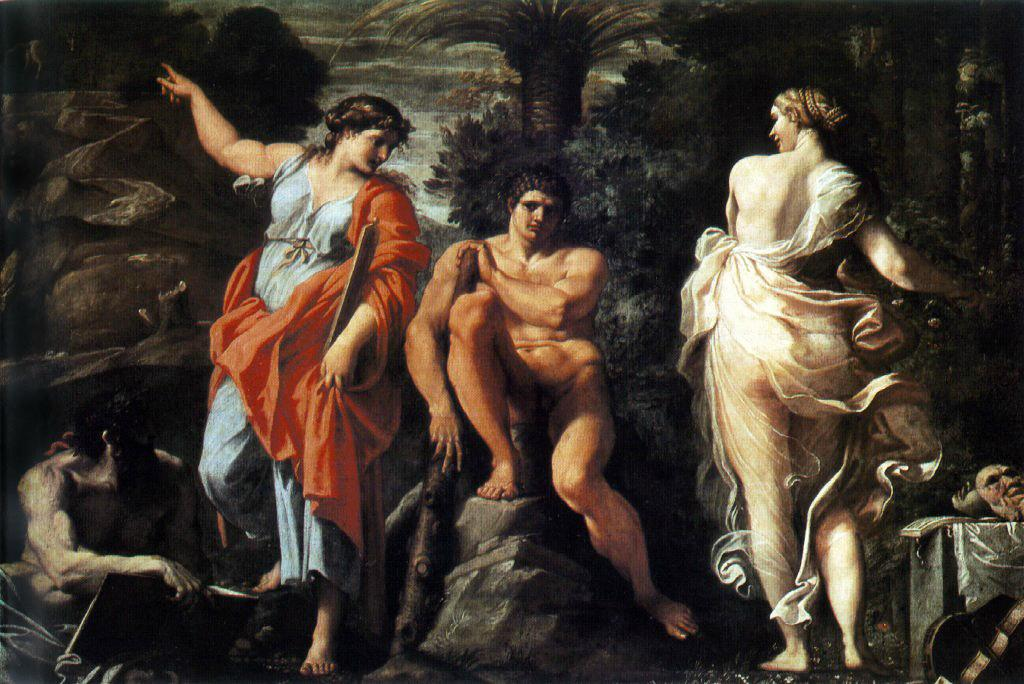
- Artist: Annibale Carracci
- Year: 1596
- Medium: Oil on canvas
- Dimensions: 166 cm × 237 cm (65 in × 93 in)
- Location: Capodimonte Gallery; Naples

The Choice of Hercules is a painting by the Italian Baroque painter Annibale Carracci. Dating from 1596, it is housed in the Capodimonte Gallery of Naples. The subject is the Choice of Hercules.

Carracci, who was in Rome from the late 1595 or early 1596, was commissioned this work by Cardinal Odoardo Farnese for the ceiling of his camerino in his family's palace. In 1662 it was moved to the Farnese ducal seat in Parma. The work is considered one of Carracci's masterworks for its balanced rendering of a poetical ideal, graphically influenced by the artist's contact with Michelangelo's Sistine Chapel frescoes and Rome's classical remains, such as the Farnese Hercules or the Laocoön group.

A vigorous and plastic Hercules is depicted with two women flanking him, who represent the opposite destinies which life could reserve him: to his right Virtue is calling him to the hardest path leading to glory through hardship, while on his left, a woman with worldly pleasures, the easier path, is enticing him to vice.

Behind Hercules is a palm, which, through the leaves and the branches (a symbol of military victory and fame), hints to Hercules' future heroic life. At the top of the hardest path is Hercules reward, Pegasus.
