= Laura Cretara =

Italian medallist and engraver

Italian coin of 100 lire CuNi 81/19

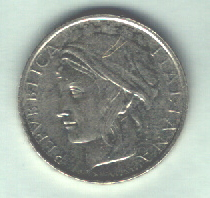
Towered Italy surrounded by the inscription "REPVBBLICA ITALIANA". In exergue L. CRETARA

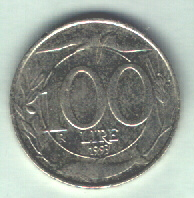
Face value among olive-tree branches, the date (1993) and the mint-mark (R) for Rome. On top: eagle; on bottom: dolphin

Laura Cretara (Rome, December 28, 1939) is an Italian medallist and engraver.

== Biography ==
Following her father's footsteps (Francesco was a painter and engraver, member of the Communist Party of Italy), she had her first artistic training at home. She completed her education attending the Artistic High School, then the Academy of Beautiful Arts of Rome. Later, she attended the "Scuola dell'Arte della Medaglia della Zecca di Stato" (School of Art of Medal of the Mint of State) where she had teachers like Guttuso, Fazzini, Giampaoli and Balardi.

In 1961 she was employed as engraver at the Mint of Rome and in 1970 she drew the reverse of the silver coin of 1000 lire struck for the 100th anniversary of Rome as Capital. She's been the first woman in Italy to sign a coin.

She designed the 100 lire coined since 1993, as well as the national face of the one euro coin with the Vitruvian man by Leonardo.

She also designed great part of the Italian bimetallic coins of 500 lire.
