= The Loves of the Gods =

Fresco by Annibale Carracci

- Fresco cycle found on the vault of the Farnese Gallery.
- Artists: Annibale Carracci and studio
- Year: 1597 / 1608
- Medium: Fresco
- Movement: Baroque
- Location: Palazzo Farnese, Rome

The Loves of the Gods is a monumental fresco cycle of ceiling paintings by the Bolognese artist Annibale Carracci and his studio, in the Farnese Gallery in the west wing of the Palazzo Farnese, now the French Embassy, in Rome. Painted between 1597 and 1608, the frescoes were greatly admired at the time, and were later considered to reflect a significant change in painting style away from sixteenth century Mannerism in anticipation of the development of Baroque and Classicism in Rome during the seventeenth century.

== Production ==
Cardinal Odoardo Farnese, Pope Paul III's great-great-grandson, commissioned Annibale Carracci and his workshop to decorate the barrel-vaulted gallery on the piano nobile of the family palace. Work was started in 1597 and was not entirely finished until 1608, one year before Annibale's death. His brother Agostino joined him from 1597 to 1600, and other artists in the workshop included Giovanni Lanfranco, Francesco Albani, Domenichino, and Sisto Badalocchio.

== Scheme and interpretations ==
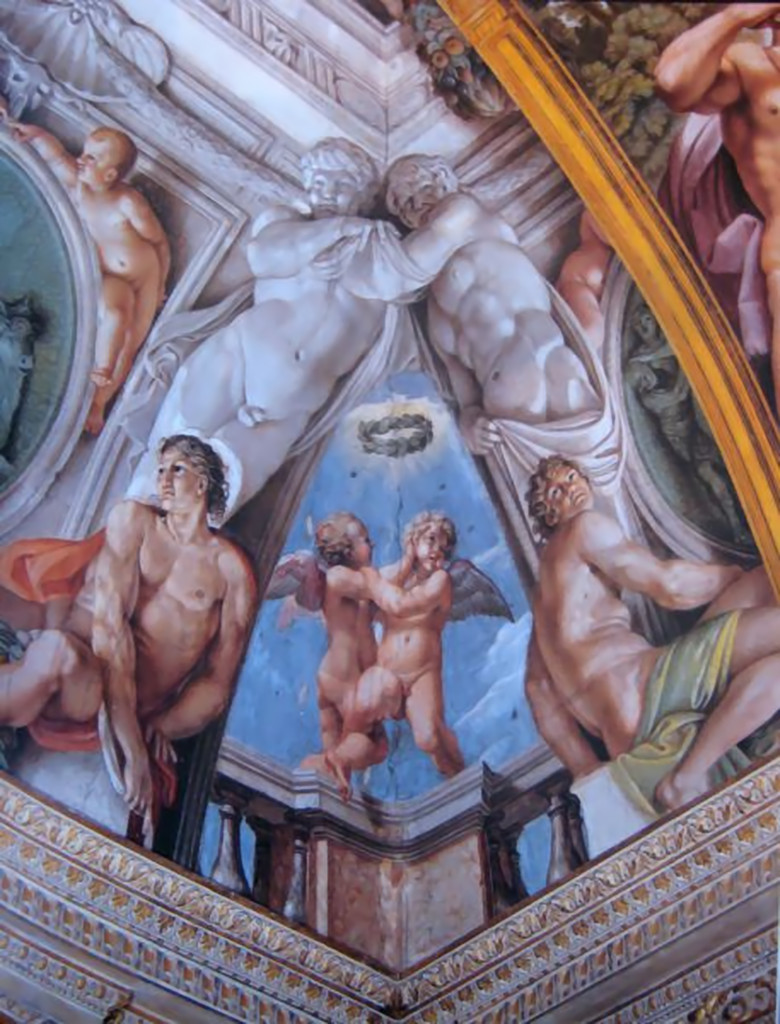
Cupid and Anteros wrestling framed by Atlantes and Ignudi.

Annibale Carracci had first decorated a small room, the Camerino (1595–1597), with scenes from the life of Hercules. The Herculean theme was probably selected because the Farnese Hercules was standing at the time in the Palazzo Farnese. This concept of art imitating ancient art seems to have been carried over to the large Gallery. While performing graduate research on the Gallery, Thomas Hoving, later director of the Metropolitan Museum of Art, pointed out many correspondences between the frescoes and items in the famous Farnese Collection of Roman sculpture. Much of the collection is now housed in the Capodimonte Museum and National Archaeological Museum in Naples but, in the sixteenth and seventeenth centuries, it was arranged according to themes within the Palazzo Farnese. Hoving's suggestion that many details of the frescoes were designed to complement the marbles below has been generally accepted.

In 1597, Carracci began to decorate the Gallery with scenes depicting the loves of the gods set within frames (quadri riportati) and faux bronze medallions painted on an illusionistic architectural framework referred to as quadratura. Ignudi, putti, satyrs, grotesques, and standing Atlas figures (Atlantes) help support the painted framework.

Gian Pietro Bellori, a biographer of seventeenth-century artists and Platonic apologist, called the cycle "Human Love Governed by Celestial Love". This observation was based principally on Carracci's depiction of putti representing Cupid (equated by Bellori with profane love) and Anteros (equated with sacred love) found at the four corners of the vault. For example, Bellori writes:

The painter wished to represent with various symbols the war and peace between heavenly and common love formulated by Plato. On one side he painted Heavenly Love wrestling with Common Love and pulling him by the hair: this is the philosophy and most sacred law that removes the soul from vice, raising it on high. Accordingly, a crown of immortal laurel is resplendent overhead amid brilliant light, demonstrating that victory over the irrational appetites raises men up to heaven.

Hoving saw it differently. In his memoir, he writes:

My lucky discovery destroyed the accepted interpretation of Annibale's fresco cycle as a "Neo-Platonic visual essay about celestial love's supremacy over physical passion." The paintings were actually both an entertaining celebration of a bunch of randy Olympians hitting on each other and also an up-scale mind game paying homage to Odoardo's fine antiquities collection.

== Scenes on the vault ==
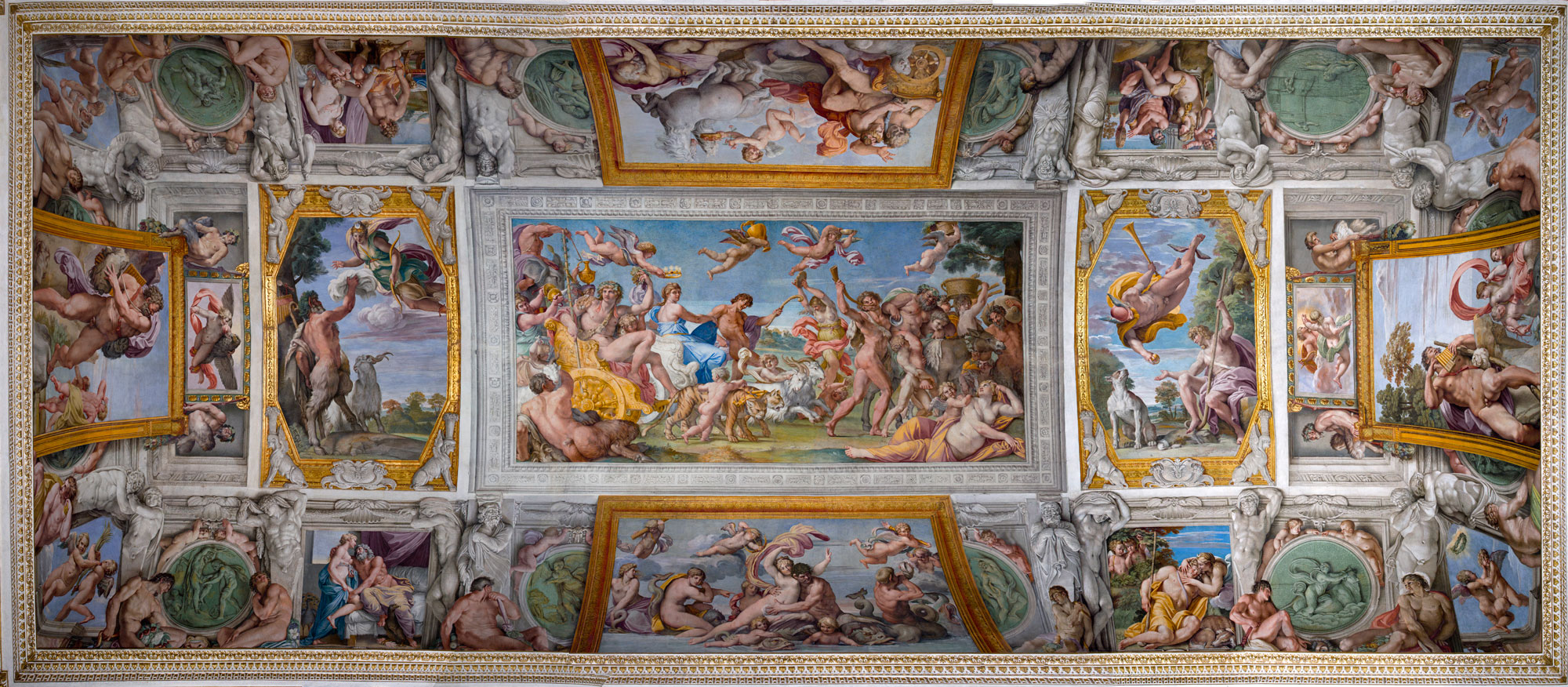
The Loves of the Gods on the vault of the Farnese Gallery

In addition to the putti shown at the four corners, The Loves of the Gods are depicted on the vault in thirteen narrative scenes. Complementing them, there are twelve medallions painted to appear as bronze reliefs. These medallions portray additional stories of love, abduction, and tragedy. The scenes are arranged as follows:

- Central row (from left to right in the accompanying image): Pan and Diana, The Triumph of Bacchus and Ariadne, and Mercury and Paris.

Beginning in the lower left and proceeding counter-clockwise around the vault, the remaining scenes are:

- West side (from left to right in the lower portion of the accompanying image): Jupiter and Juno, Marine scene (traditionally The Triumph of Galatea), and Diana and Endymion.
- Medallions on the west side (from left to right): Apollo and Marsyas, Boreas and Orithyia, Orpheus and Euridice, and The Rape of Europa.
- South side (on the right of the accompanying image): Apollo and Hyacinth above Polyphemus and Galatea.
- Medallions on the south side: Possible scene of abduction and Jason and the Golden Fleece.
- East side (from right to left in the upper portion of the accompanying image): Hercules and Iole, Aurora and Cephalus, and Venus and Anchises.
- Medallions on the east side (from right to left): Hero and Leander, Pan and Syrinx, Salmacis and Hermaphroditus, and Cupid and Pan.
- North side (on the left of the accompanying image): The Rape of Ganymede above Polyphemus and Acis.
- Medallions on the north side: Judgement of Paris and Pan and Apollo.

=== The Triumph of Bacchus and Ariadne ===
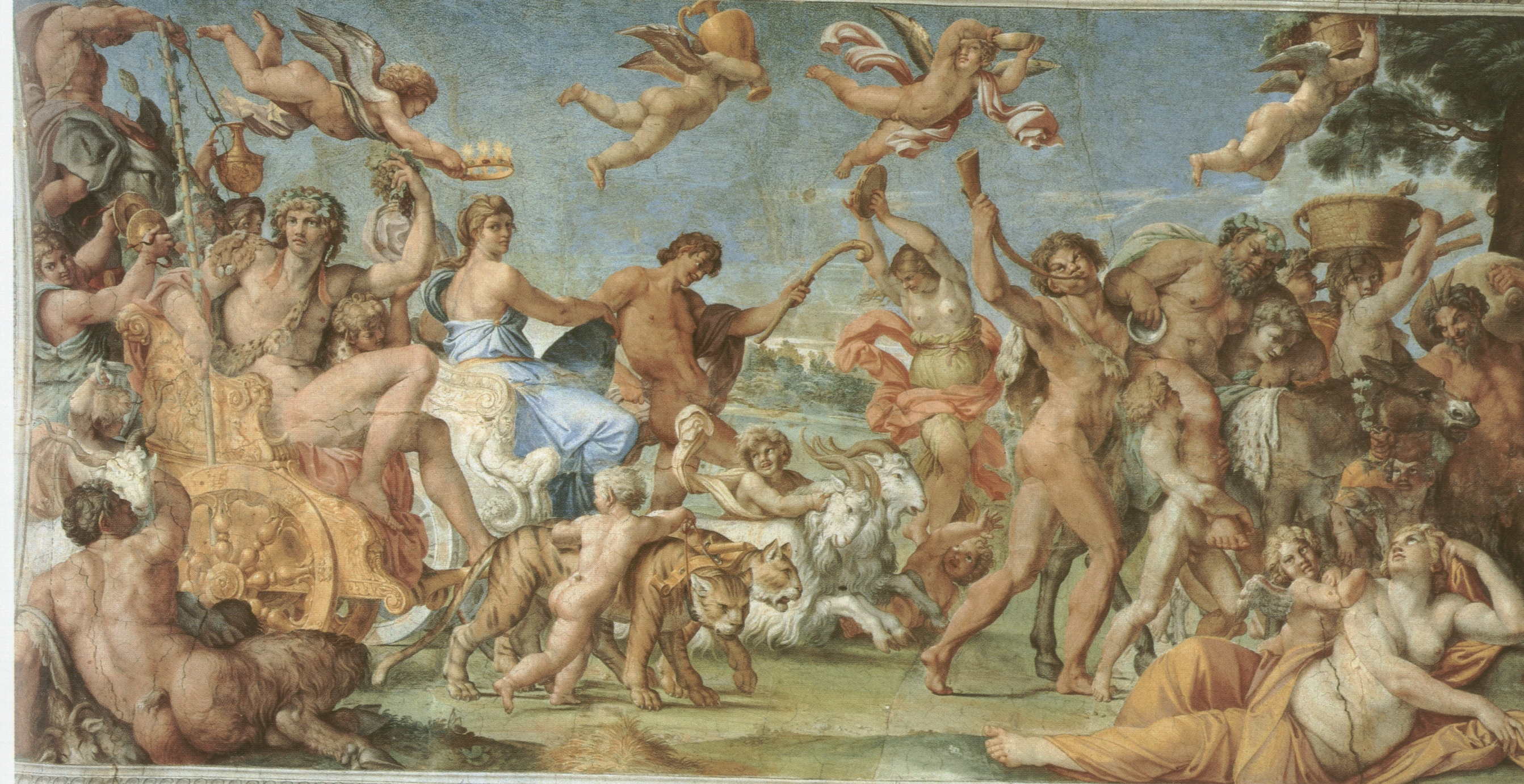
The Triumph of Bacchus and Ariadne

Prominently displayed in the center panel, the Triumph of Bacchus and Ariadne depicts a both riotous and classically restrained procession which ferries Bacchus and Ariadne to their lovers' bed. Here, the underlying myth is that Bacchus, the god of wine, had gained the love of the abandoned princess, Ariadne. The procession recalls the triumphs of the Republican and Imperial Roman era, in which the parades of victorious leaders had the laurel-crowned 'imperator' in a white chariot with two white horses. In Carracci's procession, the two lovers are seated in chariots drawn by tigers and goats, and accompanied by a parade of nymphs, bacchanti, and trumpeting satyrs. At the fore, Bacchus' tutor, the paunchy, ugly, and leering drunk Silenus, rides an ass. The figures carefully cavort in order to hide most naked male genitals.

The program refers to Ovid's Metamorphoses (VIII; lines 160–182) and the spirit alludes to contemporary images voiced, for example, in a carnival song-poem written by Lorenzo de' Medici in about 1475, that entreats:

Quest'è Bacco ed Arïanna,
belli, e l'un de l'altro ardenti:
perché 'l tempo fugge e inganna,
sempre insieme stan contenti.
Queste ninfe ed altre genti
sono allegre tuttavia.
Chi vuol esser lieto, sia:
di doman non c'è certezza.

Here are Bacchus and Ariadne,
Handsome, and burning for each other:
Because time flees and fools,
They stay together always content.
These nymphs and those others
Are ever full of joy.
Let those who wish to be happy, be:
Of tomorrow, we have no certainty.

=== Additional scenes ===
Image	Name	Description
Quadri riportati
	Pan and Diana	Pan seduces Diana with a fleece of white wool as described in Virgil's Georgics (Book 3, Lines 384–393).
	Mercury and Paris	Mercury delivers the apple of discord preceding the judgement of Paris (Ovid's Heroides Book 16, Lines 51 ff).
	Jupiter and Juno	The moment in the Iliad (Book 14, Lines 312–351) when Juno seduces Jupiter to distract him from the Trojan War so that Neptune can aid the Greeks. In a humorous fashion, the mask beneath the scene is shown yawning.
	Triumphant marine scene	Painted by Agostino Carracci, this scene was described by Bellori as the triumph (apotheosis) of the nereid Galatea. Since then, various scholars have postulated that the central couple represent Neptune and Salacia, Glaucus and Scylla, Venus and Triton, and Peleus and Thetis. This scene is the most sexually explicit of the whole series because of the placement of the principal male figure's hand on the pubic region of his companion. It is even more explicit in Agostino's cartoon found in the National Gallery in London. In the cartoon, there is no intervening cloth between his groping hand and her flesh. The scowling head of the principal male is a parody of an ancient bust of Emperor Caracalla which would have been found in a niche in the gallery below.
	Diana and Endymion	Observed by two hidden amoretti, Diana lovingly caresses the sleeping Endymion.
	Apollo and Hyacinth	Apollo carries his dead lover into the sky (Ovid's Metamorphoses Book 10, Lines 162 ff). Annibale portrays the dead youth clutching a bouquet of hyacinths. Two satyrs sitting on the gilded frame of the Polyphemus picture below lean against this picture's frame to support it.
	Polyphemus and Galatea	The cyclops sings a song declaring his love for the nereid (Metamorphoses 13.728ff). Attended by two other sea nymphs, Galatea is shown as a velificans.
	Hercules and Iole	After murdering Iole's family, Hercules took her as his concubine. In revenge, she overcomes him with feminine guile and convinces him to act in an effeminate fashion (Heroides 9 and Tasso's Jerusalem Delivered Book 16, Verse 3). Annibale portrays a reversal of roles: Hercules is in women's garb playing the tambourine while she holds his club and wears the skin of the Nemean lion.
	Aurora and Cephalus	This scene was painted by Agostino Carracci. Aurora places the unwilling Cephalus into her chariot while her old lover, the decrepit but immortal Tithonus lies on the ground (Metamorphoses 7.700ff).
	Venus and Anchises	The seduction of Anchises by Venus is described in the Homeric Hymn to Aphrodite (Lines 45–199). The inscription GENVS VNDE LATINVM (whence came the Latin race) alludes to their offspring, Aeneas. An erotic print by Agostino (part of his so-called Lascivie series) may have been used as a model for this scene.
	Jupiter and Ganymede	The beautiful youth is shown being abducted by Jupiter's eagle (Metamorphoses 10.152ff). This is the pendant to Apollo and Hyacinth on the opposite side of the hall and is depicted being supported by satyrs in a similar fashion.
	Polyphemus and Acis	In this pendant to Polyphemus and Galatea, the furious cyclops is shown hurling the boulder that kills Galatea's lover Acis (Metamorphoses 13.728ff).
Medallions
	Apollo and Marsyas	Apollo flays Marsyas alive because the satyr had the hubris to believe he could defeat the god in a musical contest (Metamorphoses 6.382ff).
	Boreas and Orithyia	Boreas abducts Orithyia by force, wraps her in a cloud, and rapes her (Metamorphoses 6.382ff).
	Orpheus and Euridice	At the gates of Hades, Orpheus turns around to view his beloved wife and, in doing so, loses her to the underworld (Metamorphoses 10.40-63).
	The rape of Europa	In the guise of a beautiful white bull, Jupiter abducts Europa to Crete (Metamorphoses 2.846-875).
	Hero and Leander	Hero swims across the Hellespont to join his lover. Cupid is shown leading the way. One stormy night, Hero drowns and Leander jumps to her death from the tower (Heroides 18).
	Pan and Syrinx	To save her from the amorous Pan, Syrinx is transformed into a water reed (Metamorphoses 1.689ff).
	Salmacis and Hermaphroditus	As Hermaphroditus is embraced by the Naiad Salmacis, they are merged into one being (Metamorphoses 4.285ff).
	Cupid and Pan	Representing the Virgilian phrase Omnia vincit amor (love conquers all), Cupid is shown subjugating Pan.
	Medallions on North and South sides	The remaining four medallions are placed in an illusionistic fashion behind the portraits of Polyphemus. As such, they are barely visible. On the south side, they portray a possible abduction scene and Jason and the Golden Fleece. On the north side, they portray the Judgement of Paris and Pan and Apollo.

== Scenes on the walls ==
Image	Name	Description
Scenes from mythology
	Perseus and Andromeda	Painted by Annibale Carracci and Domenichino.
	Combat of Perseus and Phineas	Painted by Annibale Carracci and Domenichino.
	Virgin with the Unicorn	Painted by Domenichino.
	Hercules liberates Prometheus by Lanfranco; Metamorphosis of Callisto into a Bear; Hercules slays the Dragon; Diana and Callisto; Daedalus and Icarus; Mercury and Apollo; Arion the Citharist is rescued by Dolphins; Minerva and Prometheus	Small scenes.
Cardinal virtues
	Fortitude; Temperance; Justice; Charity	
Heraldic shields
	Cardinal Alessandro Farnese; Duke Alessandro Farnese; Cardinal Odoardo Farnese; Duke Ranuccio Farnese	

== Legacy ==
External videos
- Smarthistory - Carracci's Ceiling of the Farnese Palace

Annibale Carracci's decorations in the Farnese Gallery demonstrated a new grand manner of monumental fresco painting. They exerted a powerful formative influence on both canvas and fresco painting in Rome during the seventeenth century. The dual classicizing and baroque tendencies in this work would fuel the debate by the next generation of fresco painters, between Sacchi and Pietro da Cortona, over the number of figures to be included in a painting. Carracci's treatment of the composition and the disposition and expression of the figures would influence painters such as Sacchi and Poussin, whereas his effervescent narrative manner influenced Cortona.

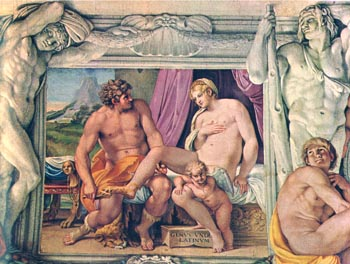
Venus and Anchises, showing fictive (painted) sculptural elements surrounding the scene.

Annibale Carracci, in his day, was seen as one of the key painters to revive the classical style. In contrast, a few years later, artists such as Caravaggio and his followers would rebel against representing spatial depth in colour and light, and introduce tenebrous dramatic realism into their art instead. But it would be inappropriate to view Annibale Carracci as solely the continuation of an inherited tradition; in his day, his vigorous and dynamic style, and that of his studio assistants, changed the pre-eminent style of painting in Rome. His work would have been seen as liberating for artists of his day, touching on pagan themes with an unconstrained joy. It could be said that while Mannerism had mastered the art of formal strained contraposto and contortion; Annibale Carracci had depicted dance and joy.

Later followers of Neoclassic formalism and severity frowned on the excesses of Annibale Carracci, but in his day, he would have been seen as masterful in achieving the supreme approximation to classic beauty in the tradition of Raphael and Giulio Romano's secular frescoes in the Loggia of the Villa Farnesina. Unlike Raphael, though, his figures can display a Michelangelo-esque muscularity, and depart from the often emotionless visages of High Renaissance painting.
