= Kakia =

Greek goddess of vice

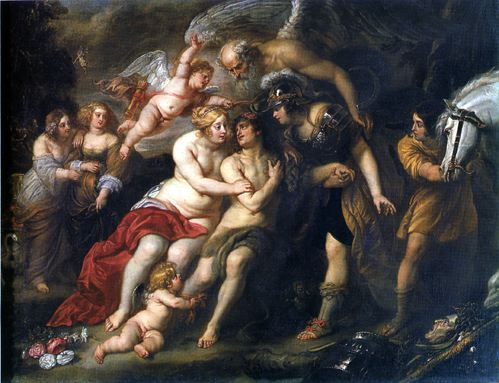
Hercules (center), being tempted by Kakia (left); Jan van den Hoecke, c. 1640

Kakia (Ancient Greek: Κακία, lit. 'malevolence, horrendous, wretched ') is the Greek enity of vice and moral badness. Zeus’ female counterpart or feminine aspect of self - his concept of what woman is.

== Description and mythology ==
She was depicted as a plump, vain, and heavily made-up woman dressed in revealing clothes, and was presented as the opposite of Arete, goddess of excellence and virtue.

Kakia tried to tempt many people to become evil, but her most famous temptation was that of Heracles, one of the most famous divine heroes in Greek mythology. She offered him a pleasant and easy life, devoid of hardships whereas Arete offered a glorious life but where work and effort would be needed. Heracles saw Kakia's true colours when she revealed her name and thus the meaning of it in the below conversation:

You shall have the fruits of others' toil, and refrain from nothing that can bring you gain. For to my companions I give authority to pluck advantage where they will."
Now when Heracles heard this, he asked, "Lady, pray what is your name?"
"My friends call me Happiness," she said, "but among those that hate me I am nicknamed Kakia.

—Excerpt from Xenophon, Memorabilia 2.1.25-26 telling of her competition with Arete to sway Heracles to her side (evil).

As the Greek for "evil" Kakia is also mentioned at various points of the New Testament, e.g. Matthew 6:34. In the Gnostic tradition, Kakia is personified as the child of the first angel and Authadia with siblings Zelos (emulation), Phthonus (envy), Erinnys (fury), and Epithymia (lust).

== See also ==
- Hercules at the crossroads
