= Camerino Farnese =

Fresco cycle

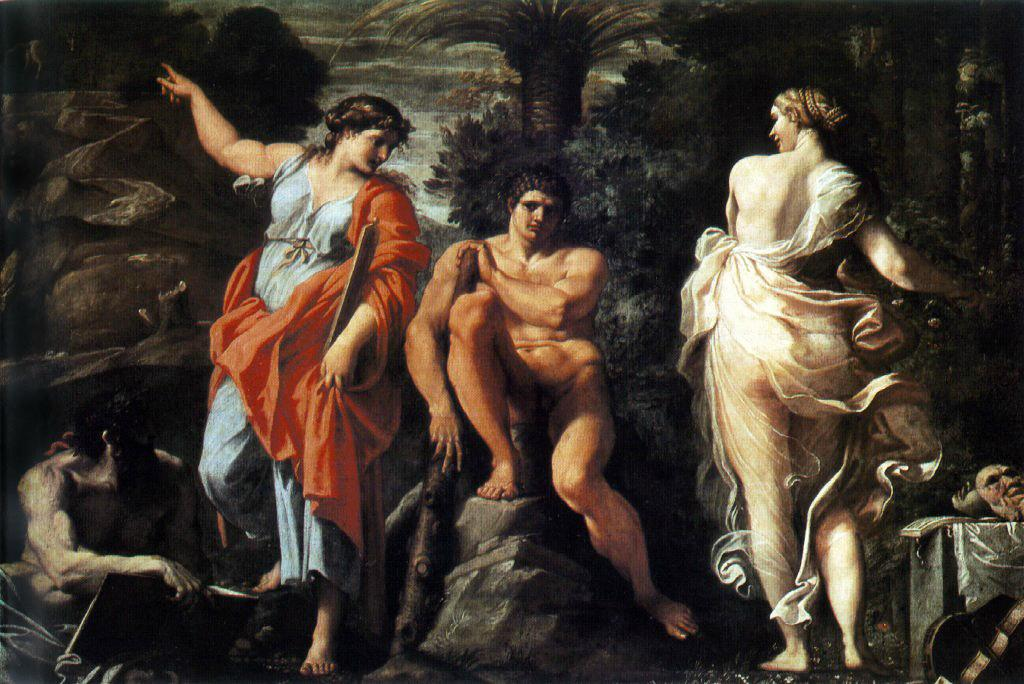
The Choice of Hercules (1596) by Annibale Carracci

The Camerino Farnese is a Fresco cycle (a series of frescos done about a particular subject) that emerged from the decision to paint the ceiling of the Camerino in Rome, before the summer of 1595. The Camerino is on the first, or principal, floor of the Palazzo Farnese, and measures slightly more than fifteen by thirty feet.

Instead of proceeding with the original plans for the Alessandro Farnese cycle, the Farnese Gallery frescoes glorifying their father's deeds would have to wait until the arrival of the book of drawings which Odoardo Fialetti had asked Cardinal Ranuccio Farnese to send him; in the meantime Annibale Carracci was to be given as his first task, the decoration of the cardinal's own study.

== Frescoes of Camerino Farnese ==
- Hercules bearing the globe
  Hercules resting
  Ulysses and Circe
  Ulysses and the Sirens
  Chastity
  Intelligence
  Security
  Piety
  Perseus and Medusa
  Catanian Brothers
  Justice
  Temperance
  Fortitude
  Prudence

== Gallery ==
Ulysses and Circe - - Annibale Carracci - 1597

Ulysses and the Sirens - Annibale Carracci - 1597

Perseus and Medusa - Annibale Carracci - 1597

Catanian Brothers - Annibale Carracci - 1597
