= Homonoia (mythology) =

Greek goddess

Homonoia or Homonoea, (/hoʊmoʊˈnɔɪə/; Ancient Greek: Ὁμόνοια) in ancient Greek religion and mythology, was a minor goddess of concord, unanimity, and oneness of mind. Along with her sister Arete, they were known as Praxidicae or the 'exacters of justice'. Her opposite was Eris (Strife).

== Mythology ==
Homonoia was believed to be the daughter of Soter, the saviour daimon, and Praxidike, the goddess of judicial punishment and vengeance. Her siblings were Arete (a goddess personifying virtue) and Ktesios, a minor god of household. Arete and Homonoia were referred to as the Praxidikai, taking this name after their mother. As such, Homonoia was probably closely identified with the Theban Goddess-Queen Harmonia.

Praxidike (Exacter of Justice): A deity whose head alone is venerated. Mnaseas in his treatise On Europe says that Soter (Saviour) and his sister Praxidike (Exacter of Justice) had a son Ctesius (Household) and daughters Homonoia (Concord) and Arete (Virtue), who were called Praxidikai (Exacters of Penalties) after their mother.

== See also ==
- Homonoia the concept of order and unity, being of one mind together.
- Harmonia is the goddess of harmony and concord
