= Homonoia =

Greek concept of order and unity

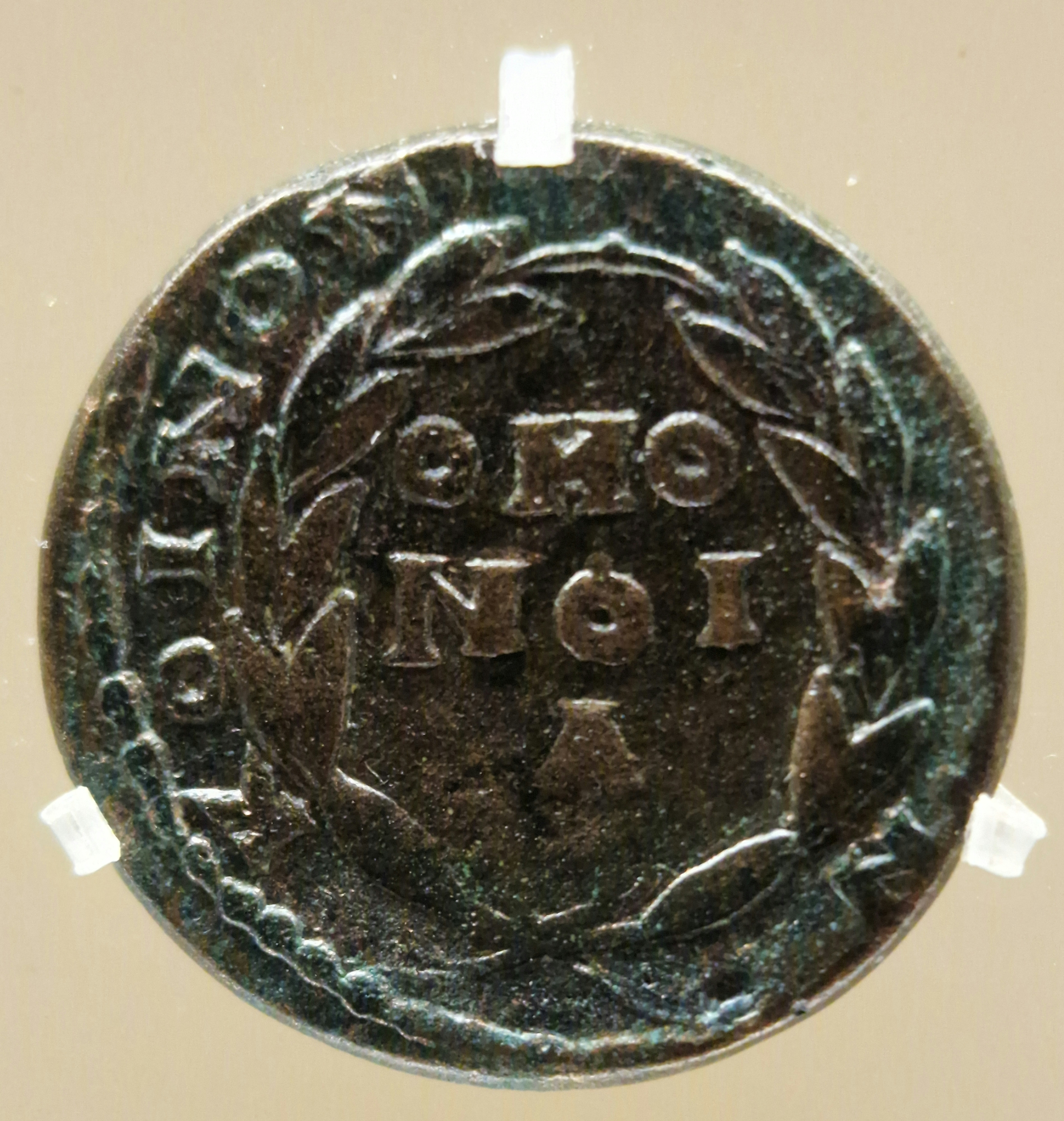
Coin of the koinon of Macedonia with the word Homonoia (ὉΜΟΝΟΙΑ) displayed within a wreath

Homonoia (/hoʊmoʊˈnɔɪə/ Greek: Ὁμόνοια) is the concept of order and unity, being of one mind together or union of hearts. It was used by the Greeks to create unity in the politics of classical Greece. It saw widespread use when Alexander the Great adopted its principles to govern his Empire.

== Interpretation ==
=== Classical Greeks ===
Homonoia was an ancient Greek concept which traditionally was not applied beyond their own culture, viewing homonoia as an absence of factional fighting in their city states. The Greeks viewed outside cultures as inferior. Aristotle reportedly told his student, a young Alexander the Great, "treat Greeks as friends, but [non-Greeks] as animals."

The scholar Isocrates later proposed that Homonoia could be applied to outside cultures and petitioned for their integration into Greek culture. While a member of the court of Philip II of Macedon, Isocrates taught the concept to influential citizens. Philip II took much of the concept to heart, but viewed it as a method reserved for the Greeks. He used the concept as his driving force behind creating the Corinthian League, an alliance to unite the Greek states for a war against the Persian Empire. After Philip II was assassinated, his son Alexander the Great became King of Macedonia and became a proponent of homonoia.

=== Alexander the Great ===
Alexander's tutor, Aristotle, viewed non-Greeks as inferior. Alexander however, ignored his teacher's indication and expanded on the concept of Homonoia. With an Empire covering most of the known world, Alexander sought to rule his Empire, composing multiple cultures, under homonoia. Alexander tried to adopt customs of the cultures he conquered such as Persian dress and customs at his court, notably the custom of proskynesis, either a symbolic kissing of the hand, or prostration on the ground, that Persians paid to their social superiors. He also married the officers of his army to Persian wives in an effort to further create a sense of oneness in his new Empire. Through his policies, he wanted to create a new Greco-Oriental empire as distinct from the more traditional system of a small ruling class of conquerors ruling over the recently vanquished. It was his practice to place the old-style Persian satrap as governors but in the newly created offices of taxation and finance he placed Macedonians. After his death most of his reforms lived on even as the Empire fragmented into successor states.

=== In the Romanized East ===
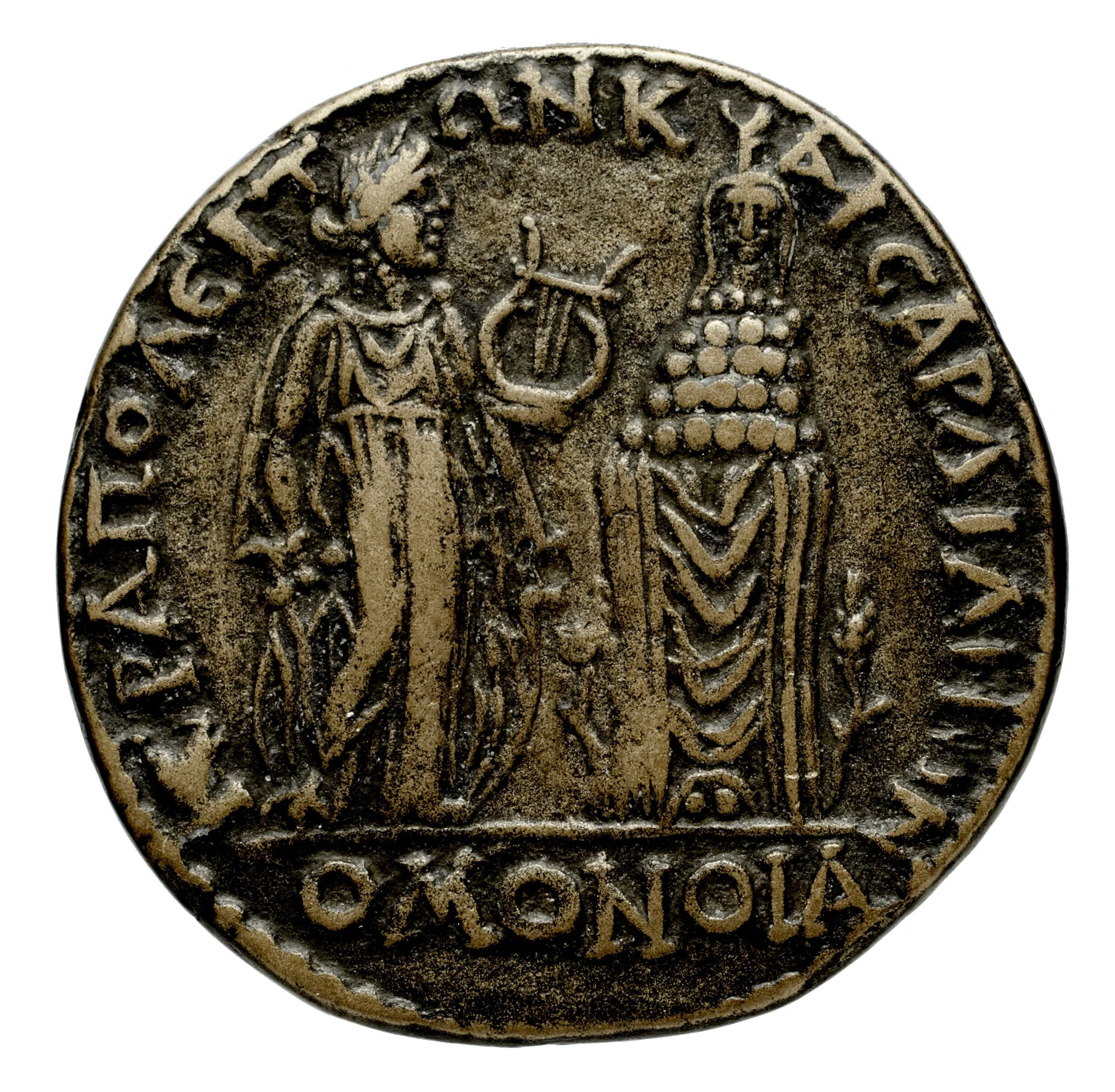
Reverse of a medallion struck by the Roman emperor Commodus in Phrygia expressing the Homonoia of Hierapolis and Sardis, with ΟΜΟΝΟΙΑ in the exergue under the deities' feet

Homonoia was extended under Roman rule in the highly urbanized East as a symbolic mechanism for dealing with intra-city tensions and for linking the sometimes intensely individual eastern city-states. A "temple of Homonoia" at Aphrodisias in Caria appears as the setting for the wedding of Callirhoe and Dionysios in the first-century CE romance Chaereas and Callirhoe. The temple is objectified in coinage of Aphrodisias that shows the cult statue of Aphrodite of Aphrodisias with those of other cities, under the legend homonoia: "Deities in the coin issues served as symbols that mediated the power within regional alliances, bolstered the prestige of the divine realm in human activity and provided the glue that bound together the political and the cosmic spheres." In the first century CE, the Greek rhetor Dio Chrysostom sought in one of his Discourses to establish homonoia between two cities that each claimed the sobriquet "first city", Nicaea and Nicopolis.

== See also ==
- Homonoia (Greek: Ὁμόνοια) Greek goddess of order and unity

== Bibliography ==
Notes

References

- Arrian (October 1983). Arrian: Anabasis of Alexander, Books 5–7. Indica. Loeb Classical Library. ISBN 0-674-99297-0. - Total pages: 608
- Dio Chrysostom (1983). Dio Chrysostom, II, Discourses 12-30. Translated by J. W. Cohoon. Harvard. Archived from the original on 2009-01-03.
- Edwards, Douglas R. (Autumn 1994). "Defining the Web of Power in Asia Minor: The Novelist Chariton and His City Aphrodisias". Journal of the American Academy of Religion. 63 (3). Oxford University Press: 699–718. doi:10.1093/jaarel/LXII.3.699. JSTOR 1465210.
- Low, Polly (2007). Interstate Relations in Classical Greece: Morality and Power. Cambridge University Press. ISBN 978-0-521-87206-5. - Total pages: 313
- Mauriac, Henry M. de (January 1949). "Alexander the Great and the Politics of "Homonoia"". Journal of the History of Ideas. 10 (1). University of Pennsylvania Press: 104–114. doi:10.2307/2707202. JSTOR 2707202.
- Price, S. R. F. (1985). Rituals and power: the Roman imperial cult in Asia Minor. Cambridge University Press. ISBN 0-521-31268-X. - Total pages: 289
- Tarn, William Woodthorpe (2002). Alexander the Great, Volume 2. Cambridge University Press. ISBN 0-521-53137-3. - Total pages: 476
- Tetlow, Elisabeth Meier (2005). Women, Crime, and Punishment in Ancient Law and Society. Continuum International Publishing Group. ISBN 0-8264-1629-2. - Total pages: 300
