= 1796 =

1796 in various calendars
- Gregorian calendar: 1796; MDCCXCVI
- French Republican calendar: 4–5; IV–V
- Ab urbe condita: 2549
- Armenian calendar: 1245; ԹՎ ՌՄԽԵ
- Assyrian calendar: 6546
- Balinese saka calendar: 1717–1718
- Bengali calendar: 1202–1203
- Berber calendar: 2746
- British Regnal year: 36 Geo. 3 – 37 Geo. 3
- Buddhist calendar: 2340
- Burmese calendar: 1158
- Byzantine calendar: 7304–7305
- Chinese calendar: 乙卯年 (Wood Rabbit); 4493 or 4286 — to — 丙辰年 (Fire Dragon); 4494 or 4287
- Coptic calendar: 1512–1513
- Discordian calendar: 2962
- Ethiopian calendar: 1788–1789
- Hebrew calendar: 5556–5557
- Hindu calendars
- Vikram Samvat: 1852–1853
- Shaka Samvat: 1717–1718
- Kali Yuga: 4896–4897
- Holocene calendar: 11796
- Igbo calendar: 796–797
- Iranian calendar: 1174–1175
- Islamic calendar: 1210–1211
- Japanese calendar: Kansei 8 (寛政８年)
- Javanese calendar: 1722–1723
- Julian calendar: Gregorian minus 11 days
- Korean calendar: 4129
- Minguo calendar: 116 before ROC 民前116年
- Nanakshahi calendar: 328
- Thai solar calendar: 2338–2339
- Tibetan calendar: ཤིང་མོ་ཡོས་ལོ་ (female Wood-Hare); 1922 or 1541 or 769 — to — མེ་ཕོ་འབྲུག་ལོ་ (male Fire-Dragon); 1923 or 1542 or 770

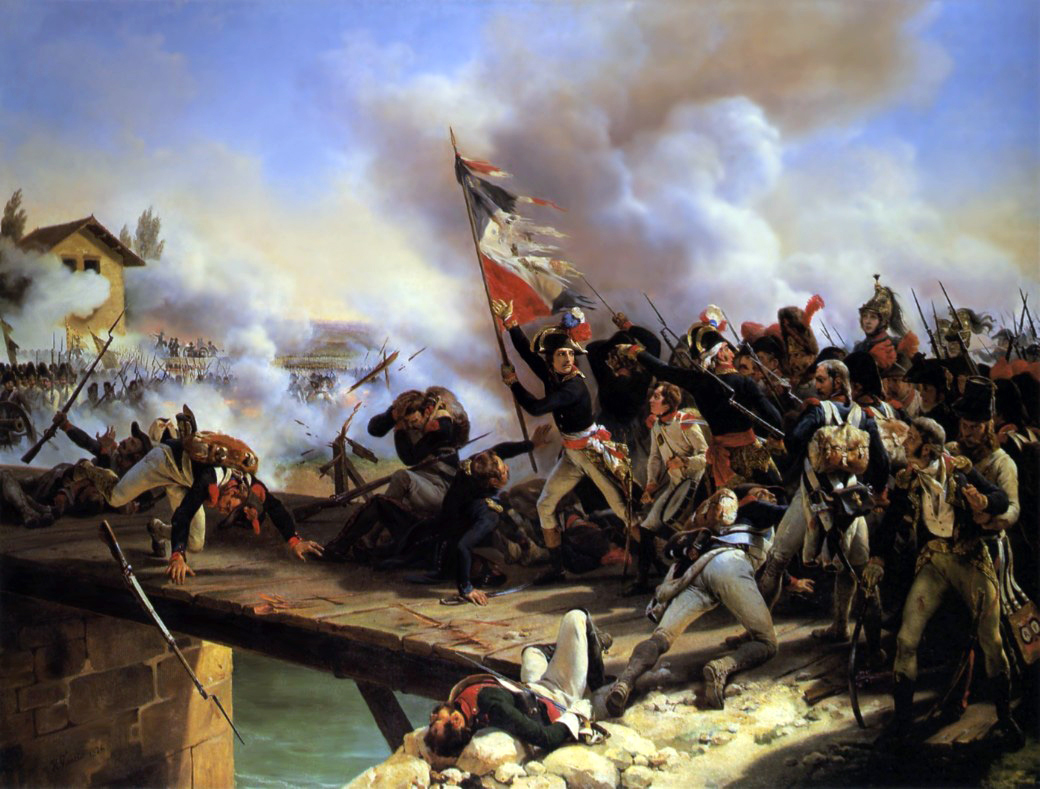
November 17: Battle of Arcole: French General Napoleon Bonaparte leads troops in defeat of the Austrian Army

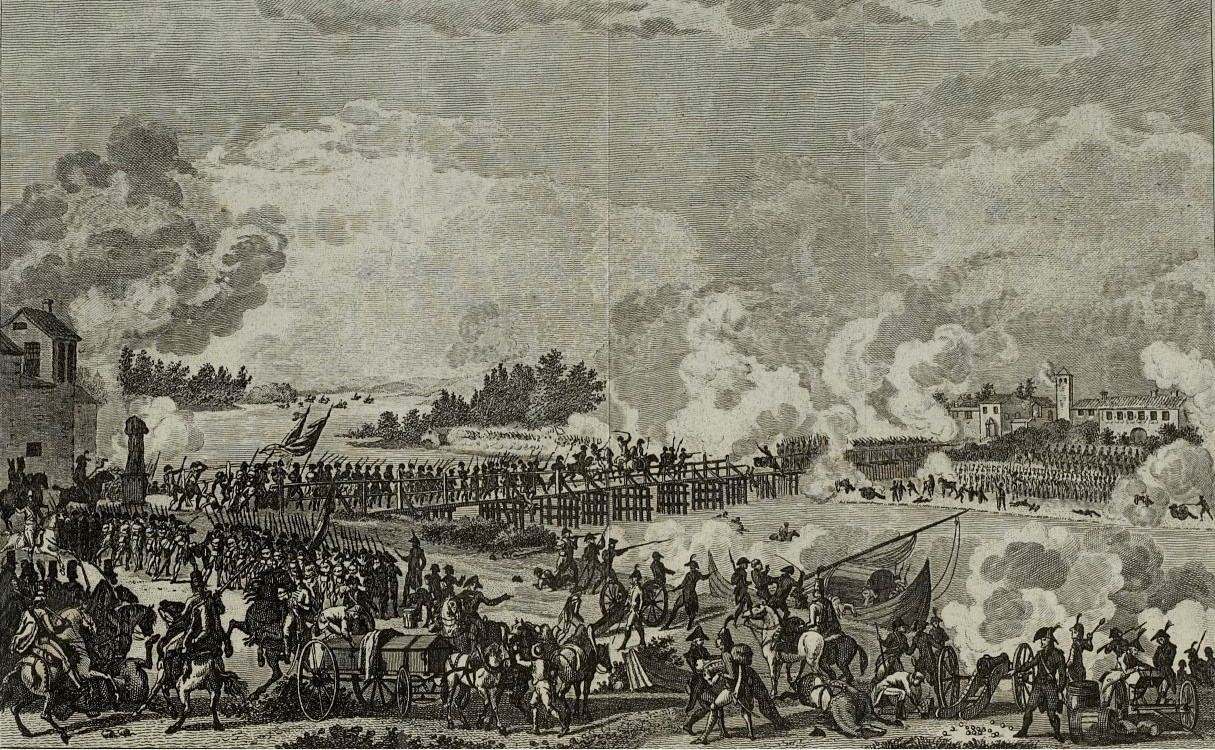
May 10: Battle of Lodi, (Musée de la Révolution française).

1796 (MDCCXCVI) was a leap year starting on Friday of the Gregorian calendar and a leap year starting on Tuesday of the Julian calendar, the 1796th year of the Common Era (CE) and Anno Domini (AD) designations, the 796th year of the 2nd millennium, the 96th year of the 18th century, and the 7th year of the 1790s decade. As of the start of 1796, the Gregorian calendar was 11 days ahead of the Julian calendar, which remained in localized use until 1923.

== Events ==
=== January–March ===
- January 16 – The first Dutch (and general) elections are held for the National Assembly of the Batavian Republic. (The next Dutch general elections are held in 1888).
- February 1 – The capital of Upper Canada is moved from Newark to York.
- February 9 – The Qianlong Emperor of China abdicates at age 84 to make way for his son, the Jiaqing Emperor.
- February 15 – French Revolutionary Wars: The Invasion of Ceylon (1795) ends when Johan van Angelbeek, the Batavian governor of Ceylon, surrenders Colombo peacefully to British forces.
- February 16 – The Kingdom of Great Britain is granted control of Ceylon by the Dutch.
- February 29 – Ratifications of the Jay Treaty between Great Britain and the United States are officially exchanged, bringing it into effect.
- March 9 – Widow Joséphine de Beauharnais marries General Napoleon Bonaparte.
- March 20 – The U.S. House of Representatives demands that the U.S. State Department supply it with documents relating to the negotiation of the Jay Treaty; President Washington declines the request, citing that only the U.S. Senate has jurisdiction over treaties.
- March 26 – Napoleon Bonaparte arrives at Nice to take command of the Army of Italy (37,000 men and 60 guns), which is scattered in detachments as far as Genoa.
- March 30 – Carl Gauss obtains conditions for the constructibility by ruler and compass of regular polygons, and can announce that the regular 17-gon is constructible by ruler and compasses.

=== April–June ===
- April 2 – The only night of the supposed Shakespearean play Vortigern and Rowena (actually written by William Henry Ireland) ends in the audience's laughter.
- April 12 – War of the First Coalition – Battle of Montenotte: Napoleon Bonaparte gains his first victory as an army commander.
- April 14–15 – War of the First Coalition – Battle of Dego: French troops under Napoleon Bonaparte defeat the Austro-Sardinian forces near Dego. The hamlet changes hands for two days in hard fighting. The battle confirms the vulnerability of dispersed coalition forces. The Austrians lose 670 men killed or wounded, plus 1,087 men captured. The French lose 621 men killed or wounded, and 317 men captured.
- April 16 – War of the First Coalition – Battle of Ceva: French troops (some 8,000 men) under General Pierre Augereau assault the Sardinian defensive positions at Ceva. After fierce fighting, the defensive system gives way under French pressure. The Sardinians are forced to withdraw. The French lose some 600 men killed or wounded.
- April 21 – War of the First Coalition – Battle of Mondovi: Napoleon Bonaparte decisively defeats the army of Piedmont-Sardinia, leaving its capital of Turin defenseless. This convinces Piedmont to sign an armistice and withdraw from the war, turning the war in Italy decisively in France's favor.
- April 26 – The French proclaim the Republic of Alba on the occupied territories. Two days later, King Victor Amadeus III of Sardinia signs the Armistice of Cherasco, in the headquarters of Napoleon. The fortresses of Coni, Tortoni and Alessandria, with all their guns, are given up.
- April 27 – Case of the Lyons Mail: During the night, five highwaymen attack the mail between Paris and Lyon, kill the postmen and steal the funds sent to the armies in Italy.
- April 28 – In an impassioned speech, U.S. Representative Fisher Ames of Massachusetts persuades his fellow members of the House to support the Jay Treaty.
- May 6 – Napoleon Bonaparte forms an advanced guard (3,500 infantry and 1,500 cavalry) under General Claude Dallemagne. He sends this force along the south bank of the Po River, to cross it with boats at Piacenza.
- May 10
  - War of the First Coalition – Battle of Lodi: General Napoleon Bonaparte defeats the Austrian rearguard, in forcing a crossing of the bridge over the Adda River in Italy. The Austrians lose some 2,000 men, 14 guns, and 30 ammunition wagons.
  - Persian Expedition of 1796: Russian troops storm Derbent.
- May 14 – Edward Jenner administers the first smallpox vaccination, in England.
- May 15 – Napoleon's troops take Milan.
- May 20 – The last mock Garrat Elections are held in Surrey, England.
- May 30 - War of the First Coalition - Battle of Borghetto: French troops (28,000 men) under Napoleon Bonaparte force a crossing of the Mincio River and push the Austrian army back towards the Tyrol. The Austrians lose 572 men killed or wounded, while the French lose some 500 men.
- June 1
  - The French-Republican army divisions of the Army of Italy invade the territories of Venice.
  - Tennessee is admitted as the 16th U.S. state.
- June 4 - The Siege of Mantua (1796-1797) begins when Napoleon Bonaparte lays siege to the city of Mantua, Austria's final stronghold in Northern Italy. The siege and Austria's attempts to relieve it will take the majority of the Italian campaign.
- June 6–7 – Ragunda lake in Sweden bursts and drains completely, leaving the Döda fallet dry.
- June 21 – Scottish explorer Mungo Park becomes the first European to reach the Niger River.
- June 23 – Napoleon Bonaparte seizes the Papal States, which become part of the revolutionary Cisalpine Republic. Pope Pius VI signs the Armistice of Bologna, and is forced to contribute (34 million francs).

=== July–September ===
- July 10 – Carl Friedrich Gauss discovers that every positive integer is representable as a sum of at most 3 triangular numbers.
- July 11 – The United States takes possession of Detroit from Great Britain, under the terms of the Jay Treaty.
- July 21 – Mungo Park reaches Ségou, the capital of the Bamana Empire.
- July 22 – Surveyors of the Connecticut Land Company name an area in Ohio Cleveland, after Gen. Moses Cleaveland, the superintendent of the surveying party.
- July 29 – The Habsburg army under Marshal Wurmser advances from the Alps, and captures Rivoli and Verona. The French abandon the east bank of the Mincio River, the outnumbered division (15,000 men) of Masséna retreats towards Lake Garda.
- August 4 – French Revolutionary Wars: Battle of Lonato – The French Army of Italy under Napoleon crushes an Austrian brigade.
- August 5 – French Revolutionary Wars: Battle of Castiglione – The French Army of Italy under Napoleon defeats the Habsburg army (25,000 men) under Marshal Wurmser, who thus fails to break the Siege of Mantua (1796–97), and is forced to retreat north up the Adige Valley.
- August 9 – The Wearmouth Bridge in England, designed by Rowland Burdon in cast iron, opens to traffic. Its span of 72 m (236 ft) makes it the world's longest single-span vehicular bridge extant at this date.
- August 10 – A mob of peasants overtakes the Convent of St. Peter (Bludenz, Austria) and murders Ignaz Anton von Indermauer.
- August 19 – Second Treaty of San Ildefonso: Spain and France form an alliance against Great Britain.
- September 2 – Jewish emancipation in the Batavian Republic (Netherlands).
- September 8 – French Revolutionary Wars: Battle of Bassano – French forces (20,000 men) under Napoleon Bonaparte and André Masséna defeat the Austrians in Veneto. Wurmser retreats towards Vicenza with just 3,500 men of his original 11,000 left to him.
- September 9 – French Revolutionary Wars: Action of 9 September 1796 – A naval engagement between French and British squadrons off Sumatra ends inconclusively.
- September 9 – Grenelle camp affair, a failed uprising by supporters of Gracchus Babeuf against the French Directory
- September 15 – Siege of Mantua: Napoleon Bonaparte fights a pitched battle at La Favorita on the east side of the Mincio River. The Austrians withdraw into the fortress of Mantua, which is crowded with nearly 30,000 men. Within six weeks, 4,000 die from wounds or sickness.
- September 17 – U.S. President George Washington issues his Farewell Address, which warns against partisan politics and foreign entanglements. In addition, he sets a precedent by declining to run for a third term.
- September 28 – Empress Catherine the Great signs an agreement with Great Britain, formally joining Russia to the coalition.

=== October–December ===
- October 19 – French Revolutionary Wars: Battle of Emmendingen – Austrian forces force the French to retreat, but commanding generals on both sides are killed.
- October – Jane Austen begins writing her first draft of Pride and Prejudice, under the title First Impressions (the book will not be published until 1813).
- November 3 – John Adams defeats Thomas Jefferson, in the 1796 U.S. presidential election.
- November 4 – The Treaty of Tripoli (between the United States and Tripoli) is signed at Tripoli (see also 1797).
- November 6
  - Catherine the Great dies, and is succeeded by her son Paul I of Russia. His wife Sophie Marie Dorothea of Württemberg becomes Empress consort.
  - French forces (9,500 men) under Masséna attack the Austrian army at Fontaniva. After a desperate assault he is outnumbered, and forced to retreat to Verona.
- November 12
  - Battle of Caldiero: French forces are defeated by the Austrians at Caldiero, and pushed back to Verona. This marks Napoleon's first defeat, losing nearly 2,000 men and 2 guns.
  - Groton, New Hampshire is incorporated as a town.
- November 17 – Battle of Arcole: French forces under General Napoleon defeat the Austrians at Arcole. After a bold maneuver, he outflanks the Austrian army (24,000 men) under Freiherr József Alvinczi, and cuts off its line of retreat. Alvinczi is forced to take up a defensive position behind the Brenta River.
- December – The British government begins work on a 40-acre (162,000 m²) site at Norman Cross, for the world's first purpose-built prisoner-of-war camp.
- December 7 – The U.S. Electoral College meets to elect John Adams president of the United States.
- December 18 – British Royal Navy ship HMS Courageux is wrecked on the Barbary Coast with the loss of 464 of the 593 onboard.

=== Date unknown ===
- The Spanish government lifts the restrictions against neutrals trading with the colonies, thus acknowledging Spain's inability to supply the colonies with needed goods and markets.
- Robert Burns's version of the Scots poem Auld Lang Syne is first published, in this year's volume of The Scots Musical Museum.
- Annual British iron production reaches 125,000 tons.
- Rizla rolling papers established.

== Births ==
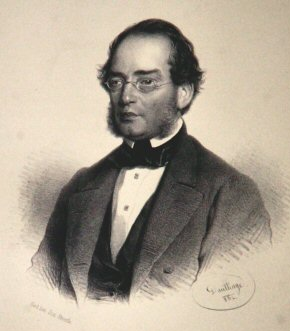
Johann Baptist Streicher born 3 January

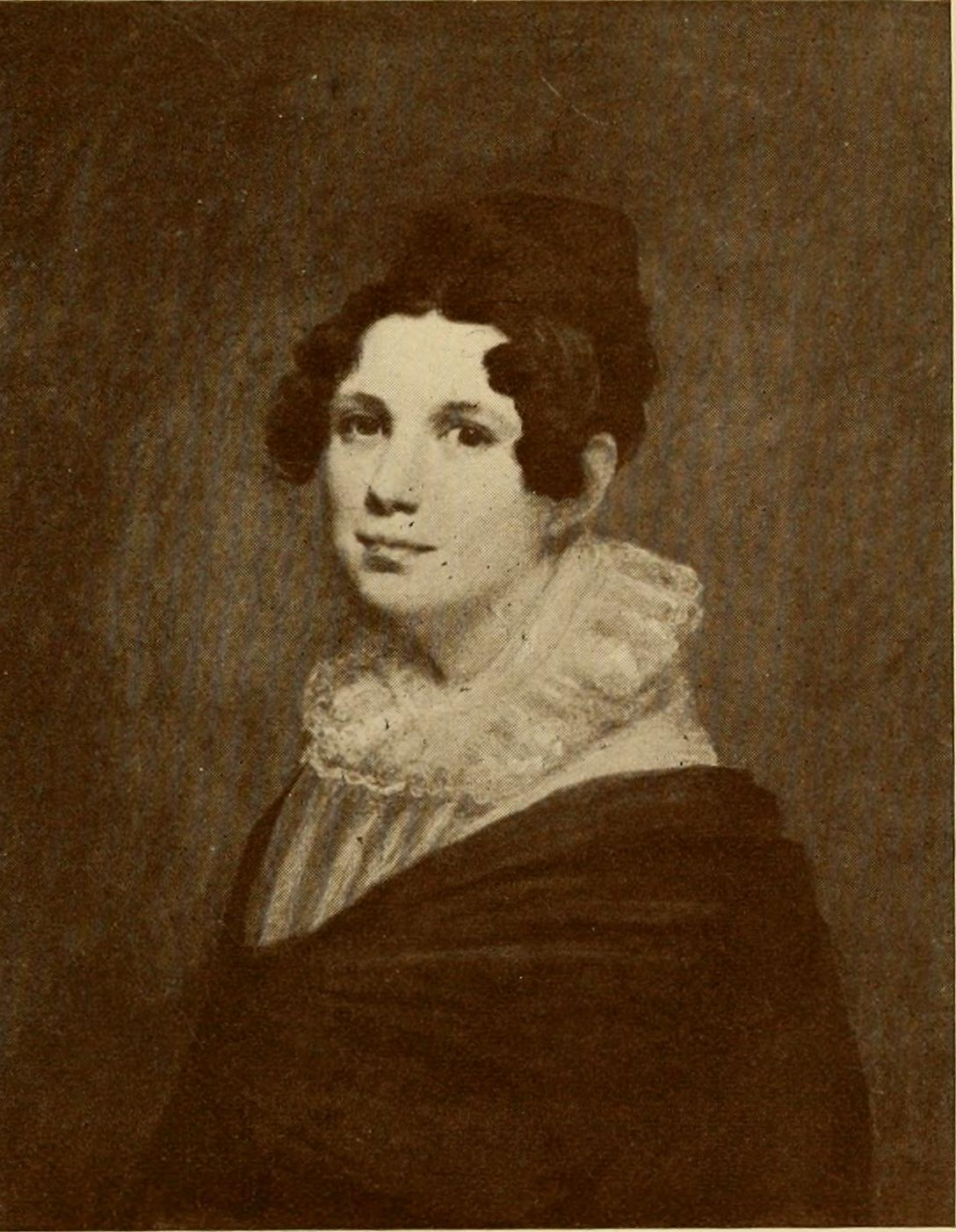
Julia Rush Cutler Ward born 5 January

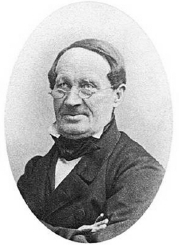
Karl Ernst Claus born 23 January

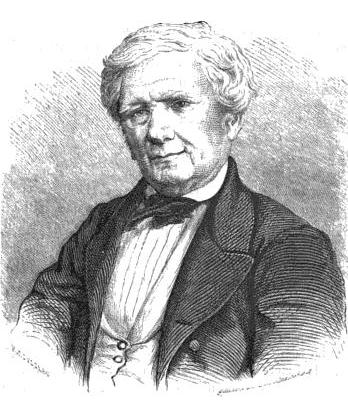
Jean Reboul born 23 January

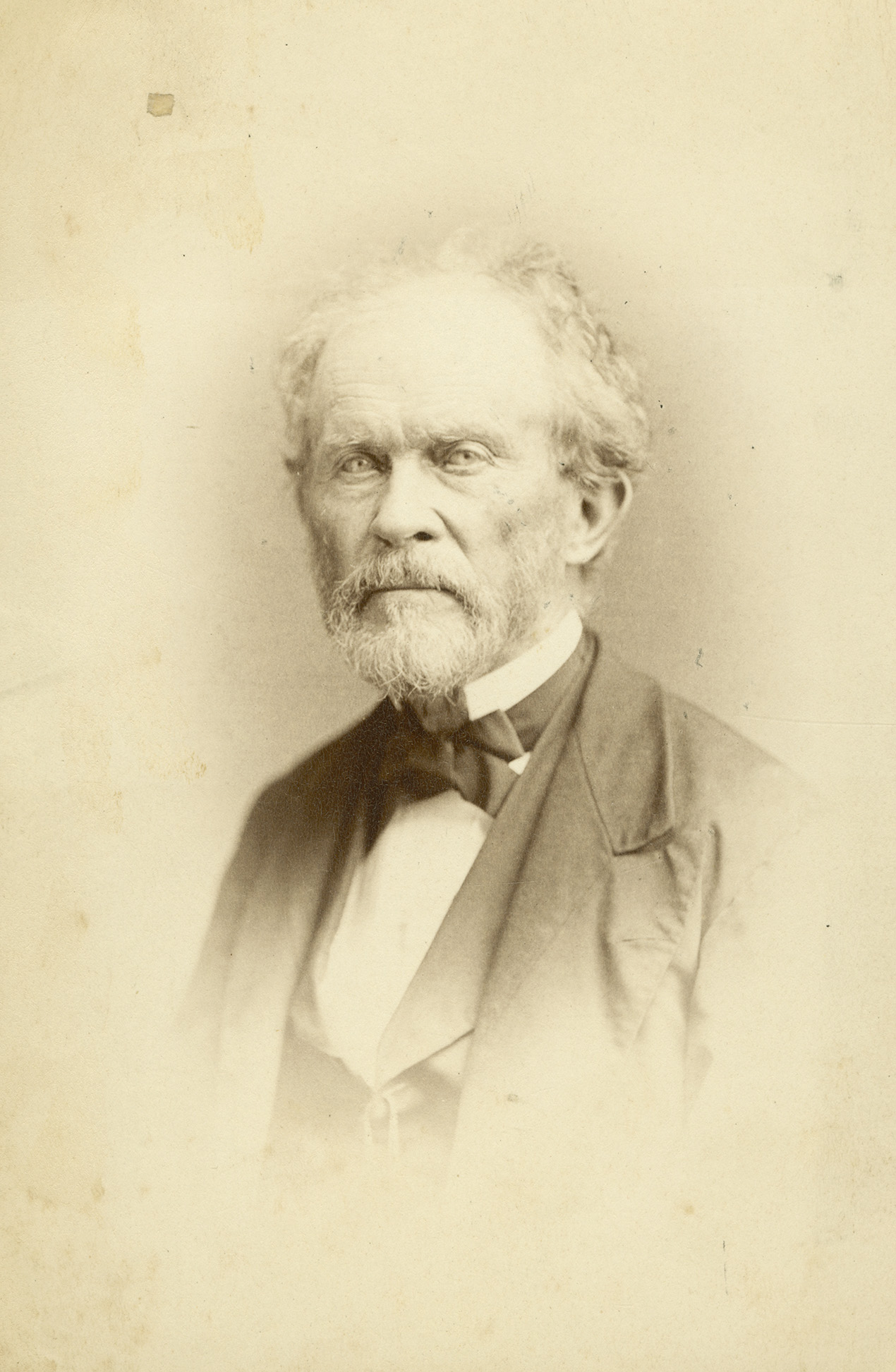
Nathaniel Jocelyn born 31 January

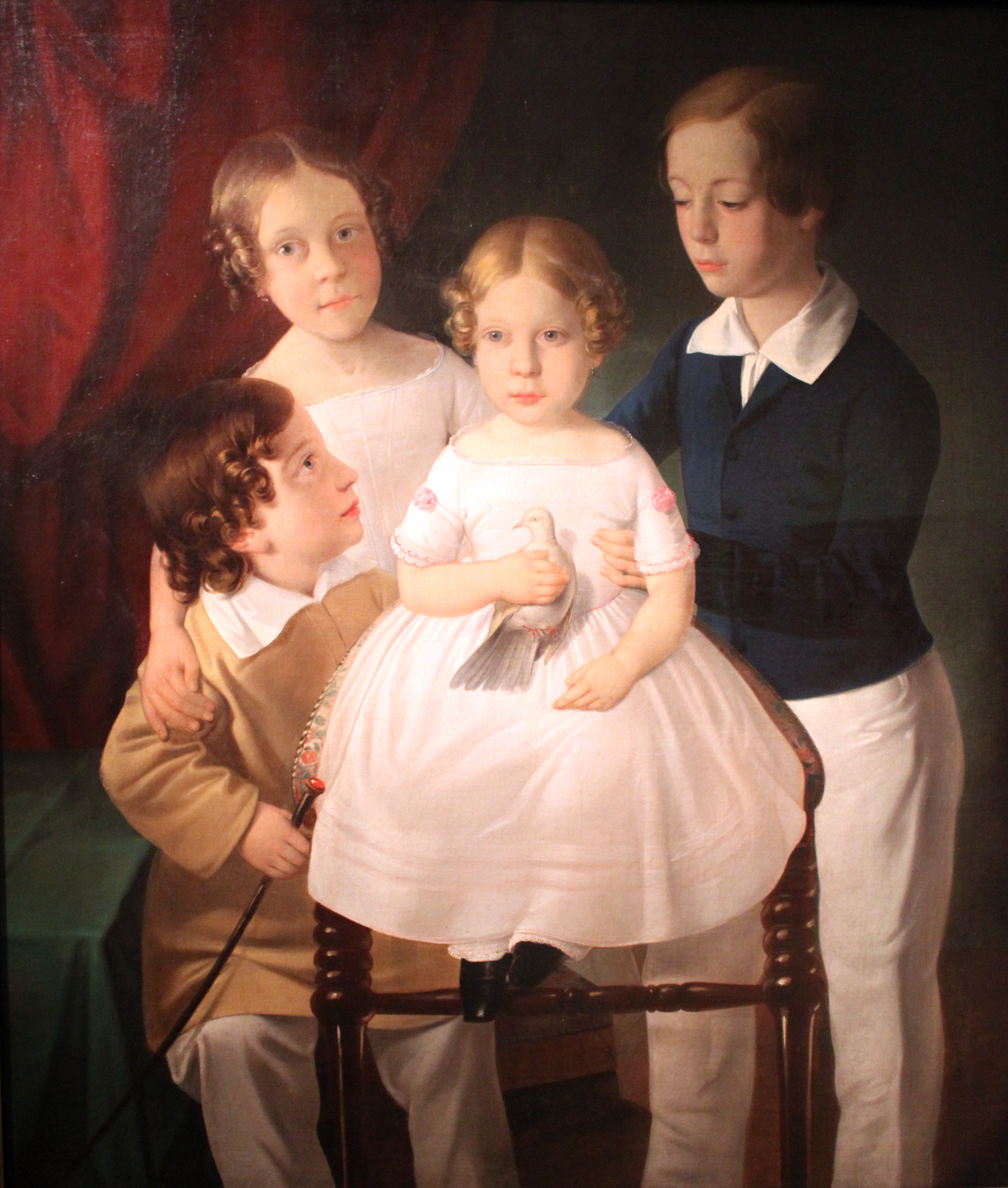
Erasmus Engert born 4 February

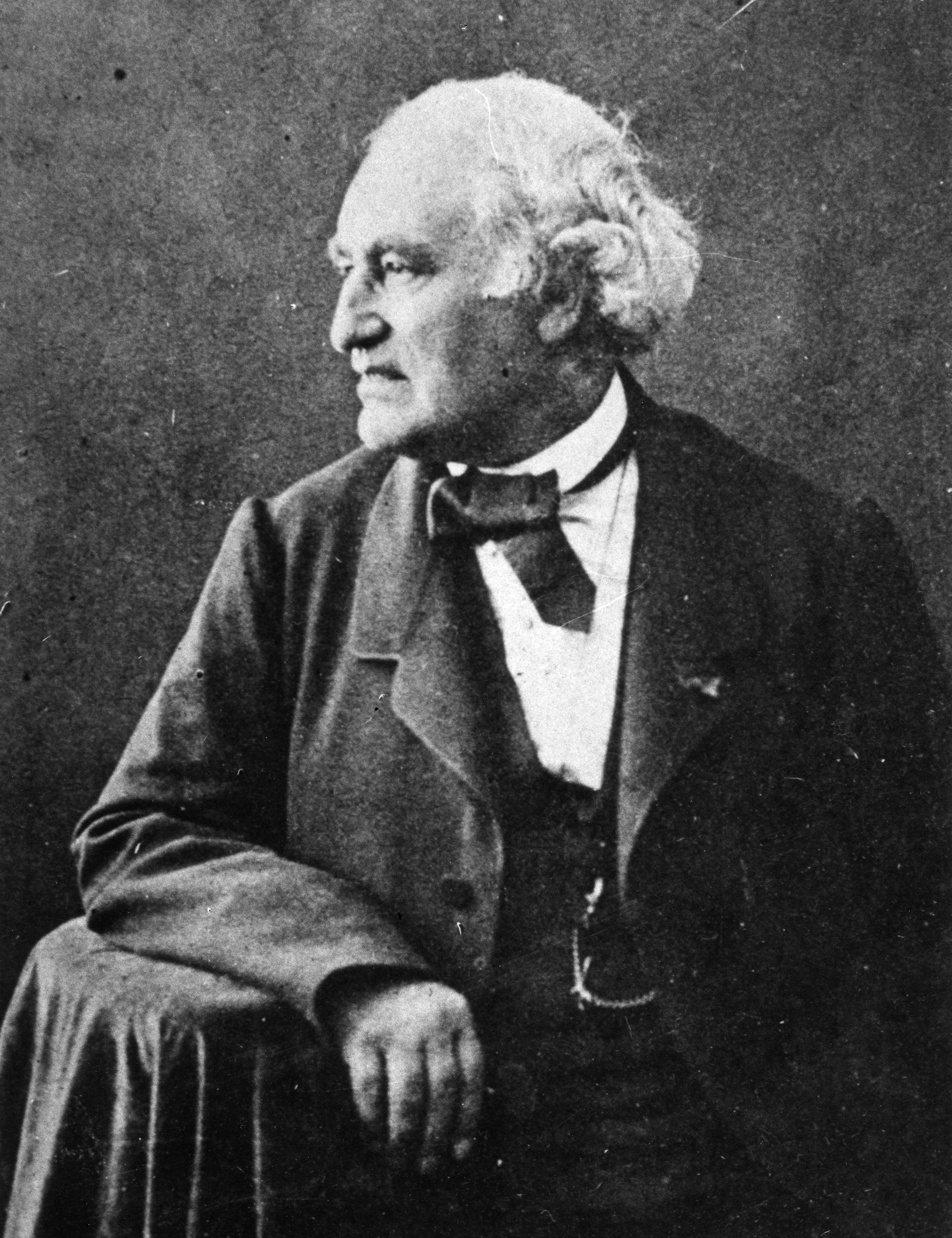
Léon Talabot born 5 February

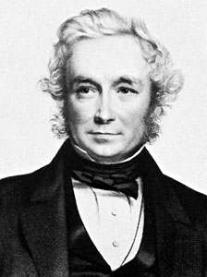
John Stevens Henslow born 6 February

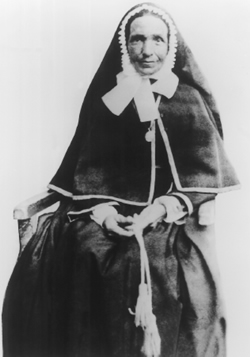
Marie-Françoise Perroton born 7 February

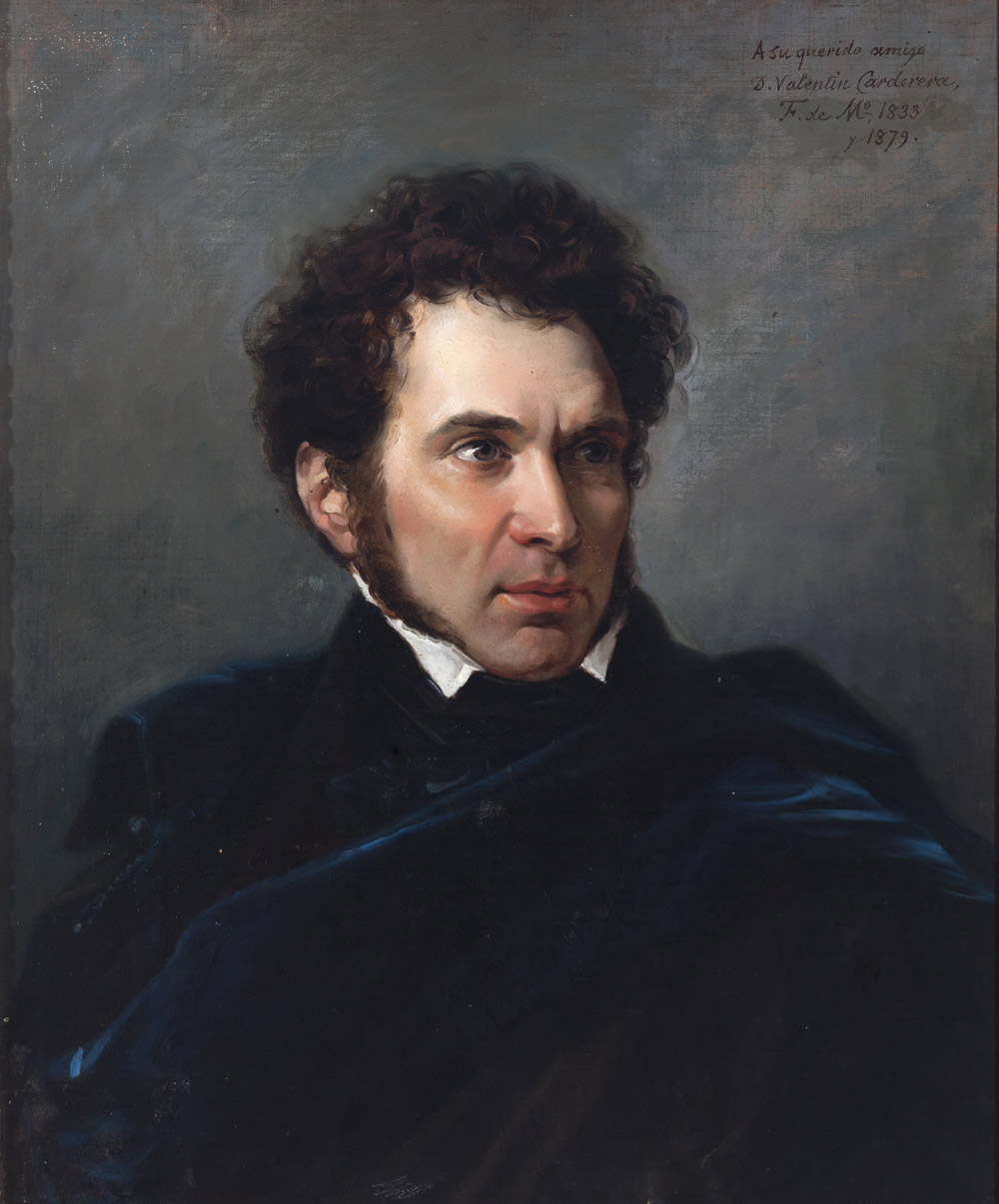
Valentín Carderera born 14 February

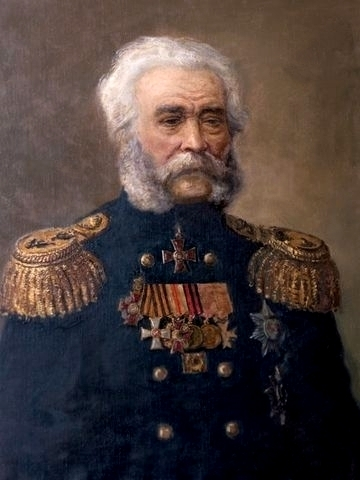
Pyotr Anjou born 15 February

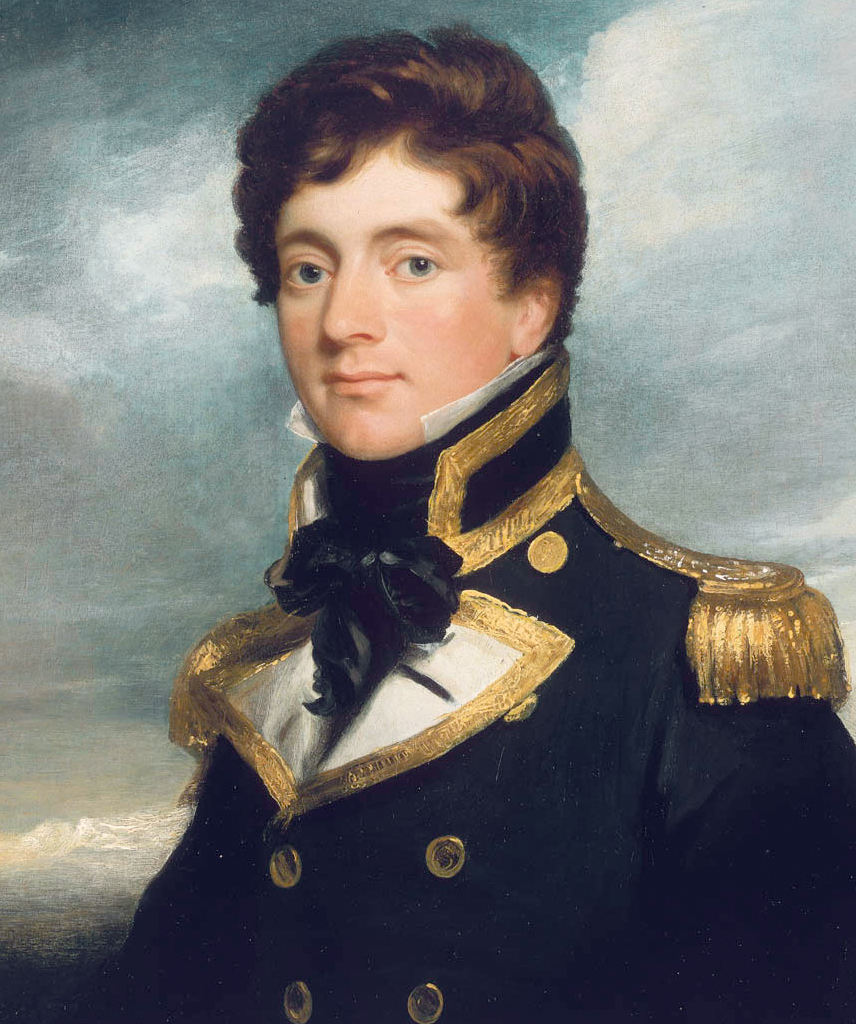
Frederick William Beechey born 17 February

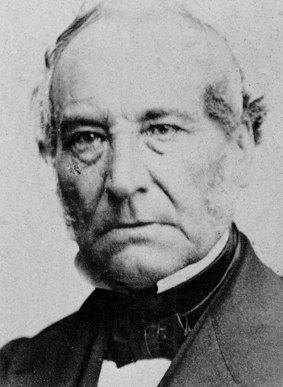
Gabriel Delafosse born 24 February

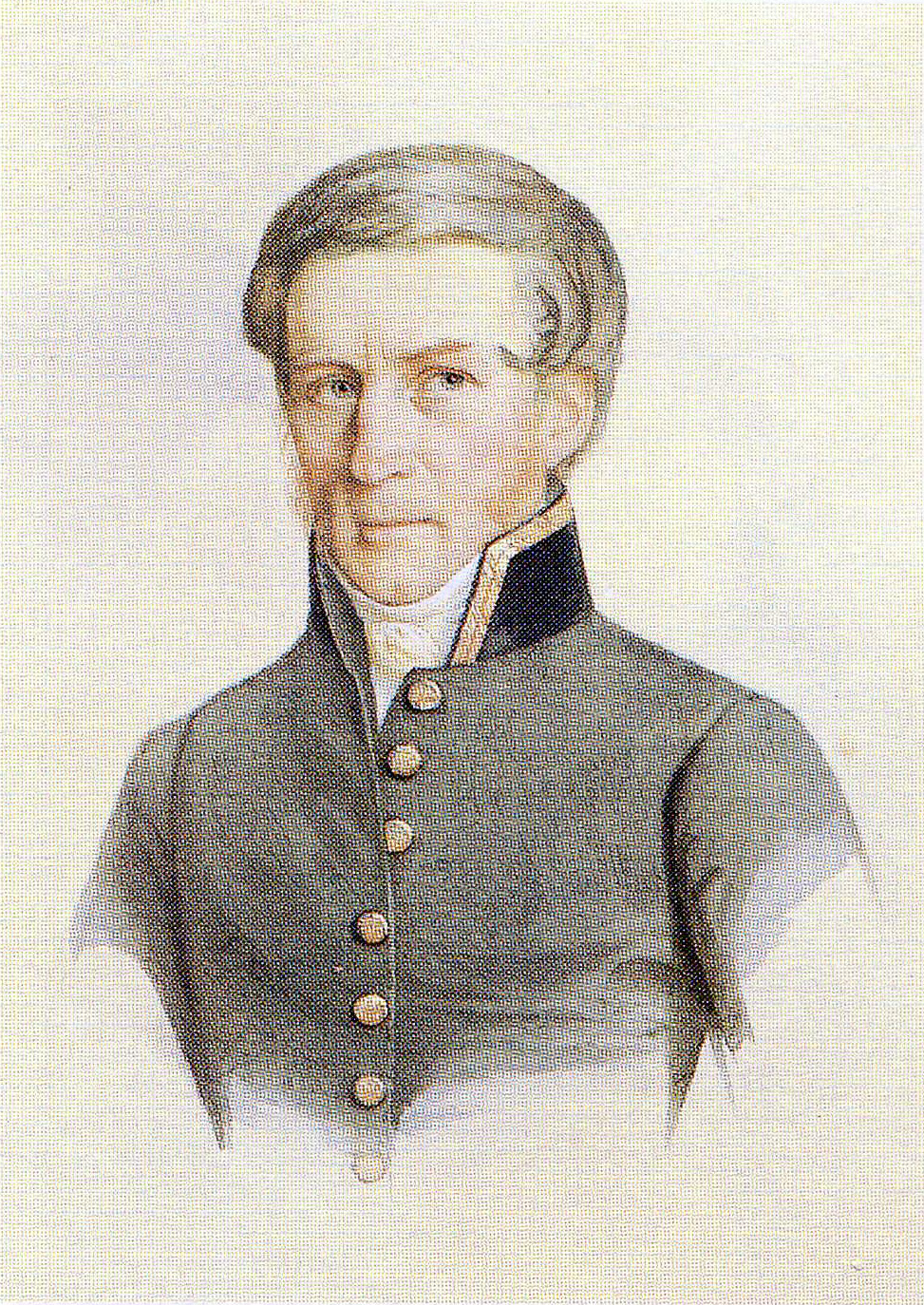
Carl Axel Gottlund born 24 February

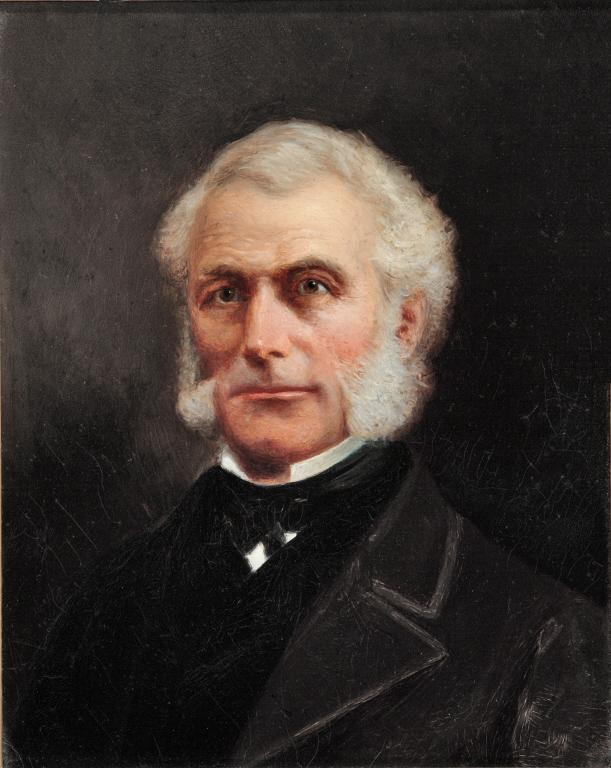
Louis-Tancrède Bouthillier born 1 March

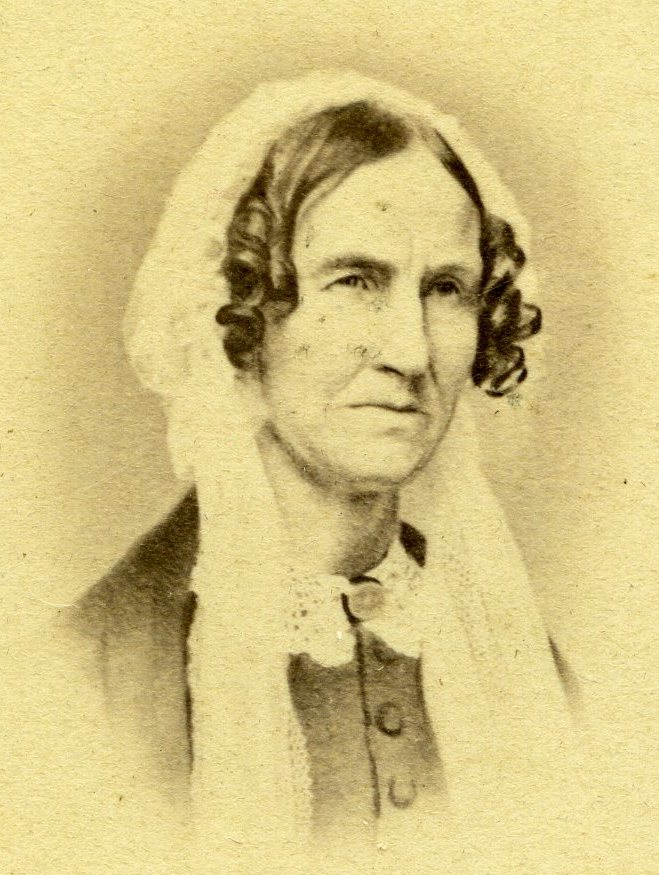
Orra White Hitchcock born 8 March

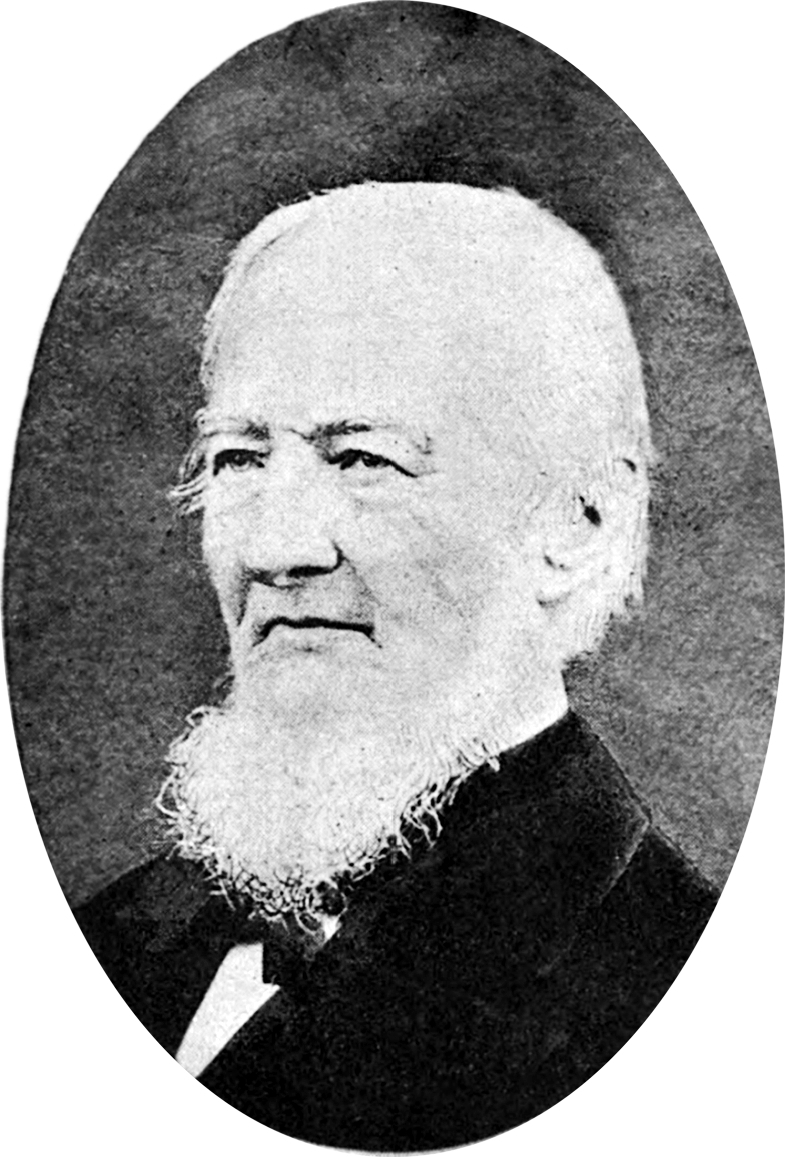
Peter Johnson Gulick born 12 March

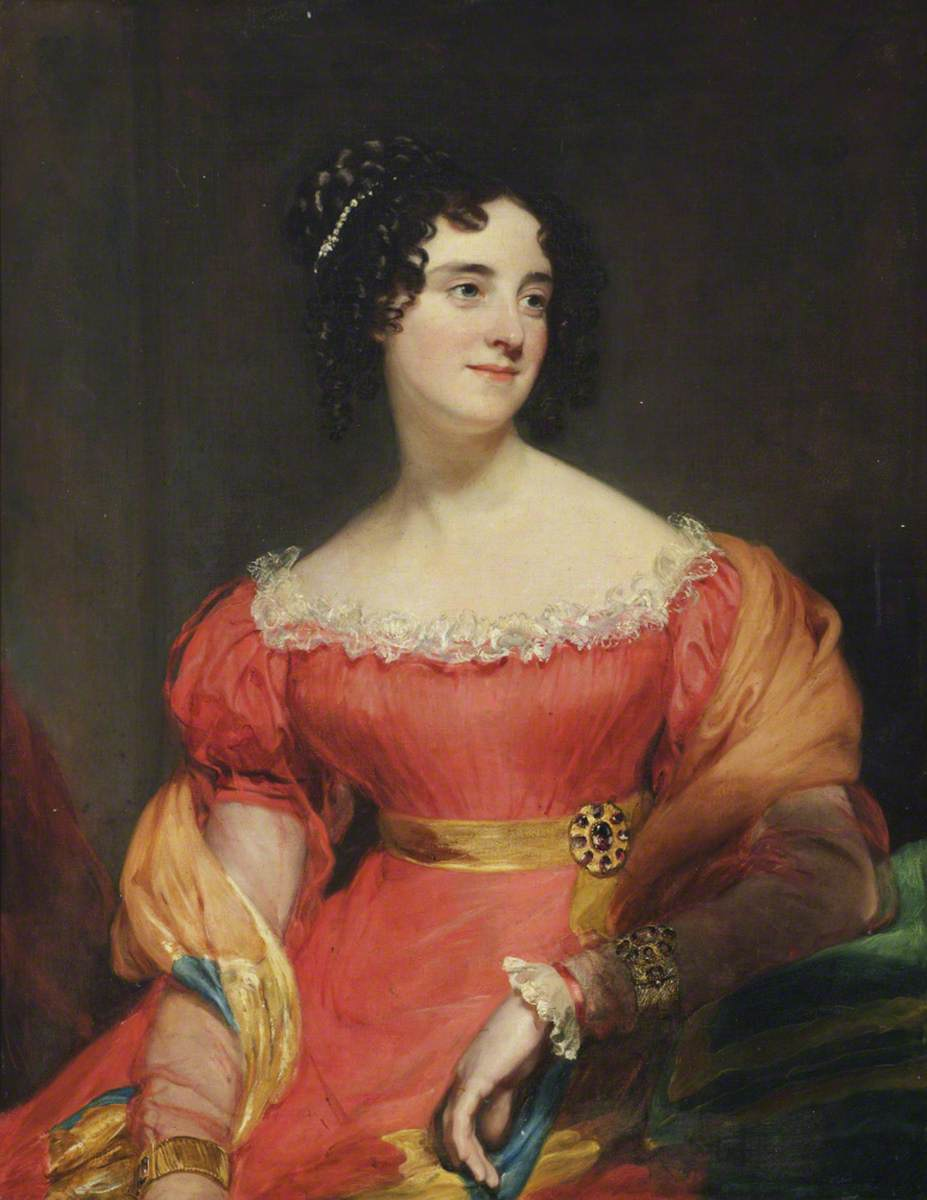
Georgiana Astley born 16 March

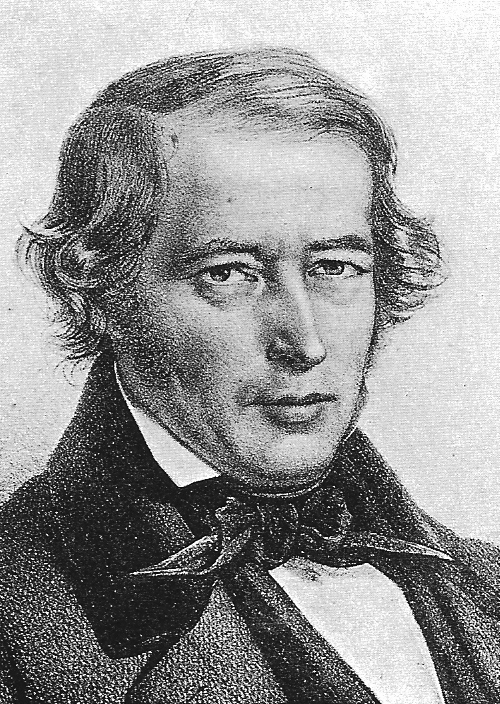
Jakob Steiner born 18 March

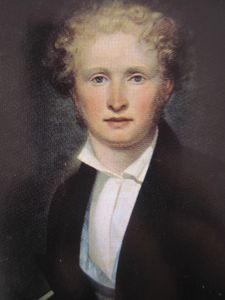
Raymond Bonheur born 20 March

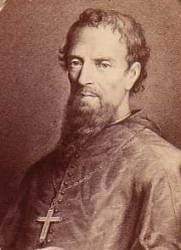
Laurent-Joseph-Marius Imbert born 23 March

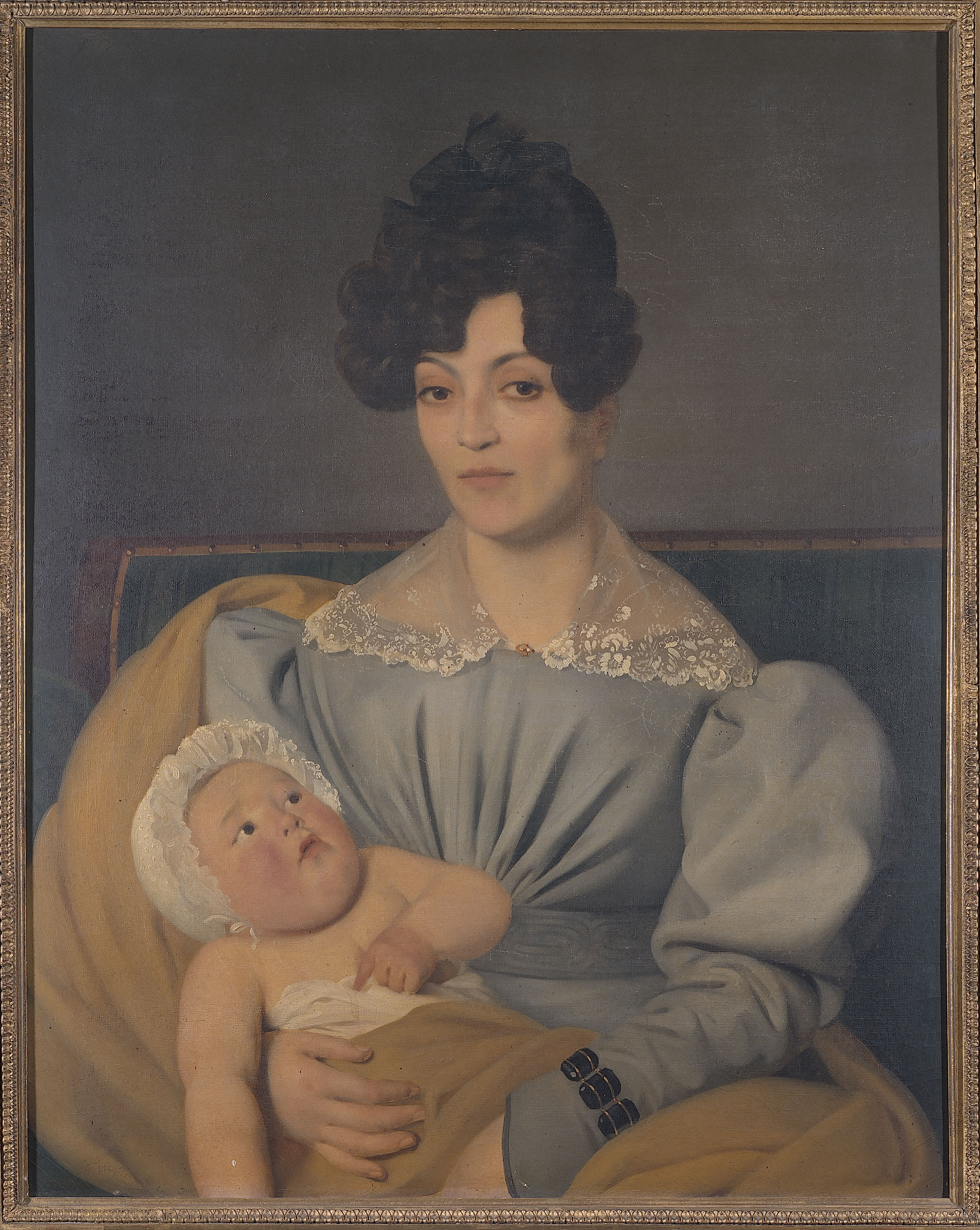
Zulma Carraud born 24 March

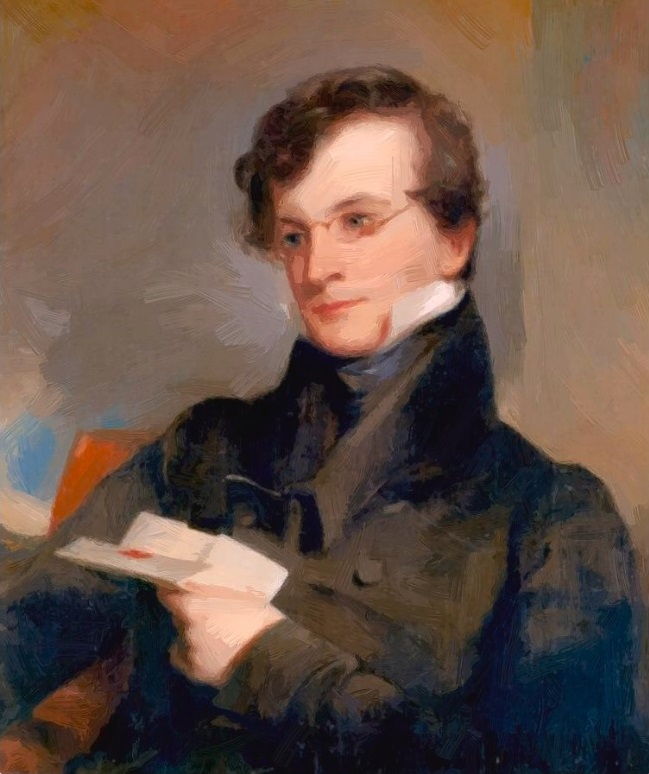
Richard Biddle born 25 March

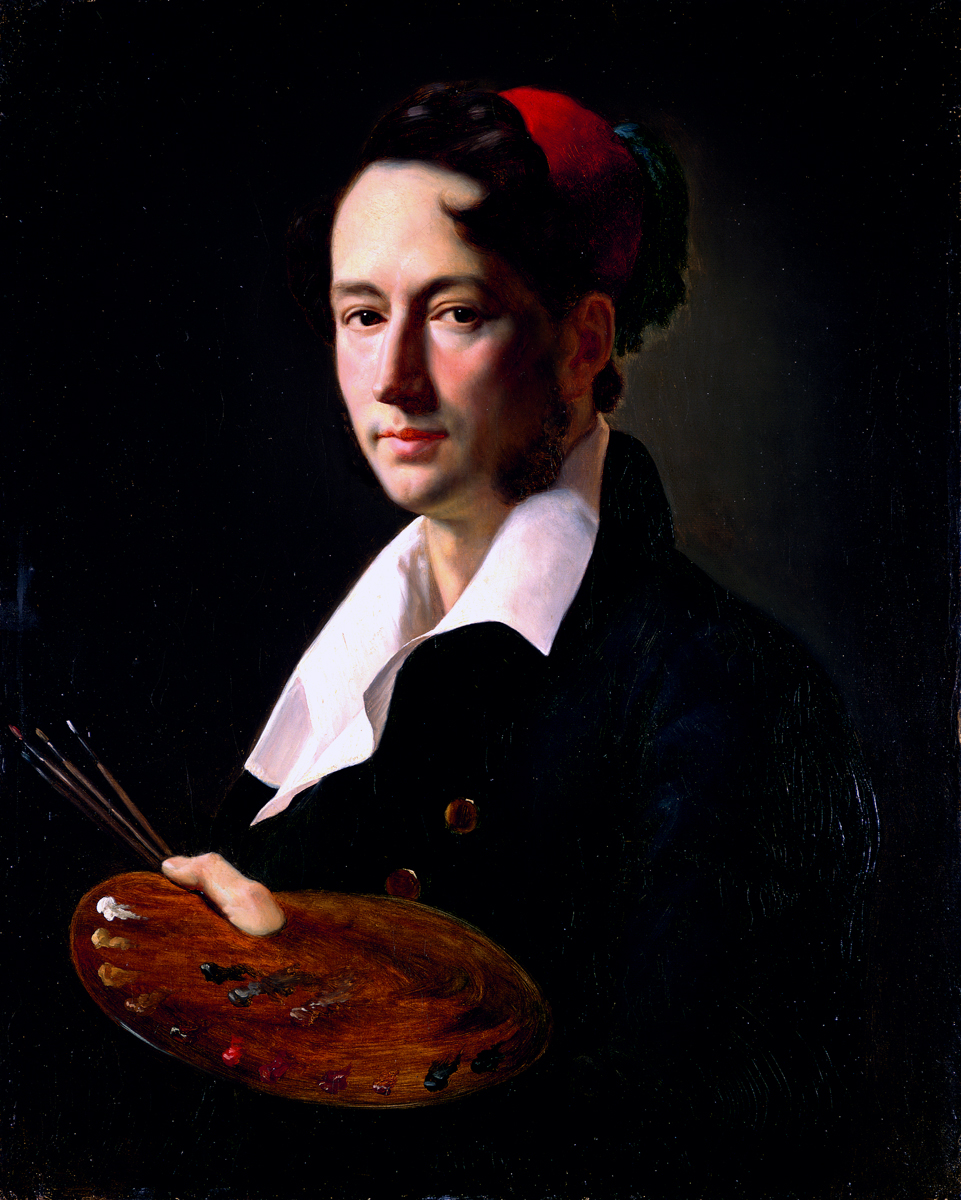
Jean-Claude Bonnefond born 27 March

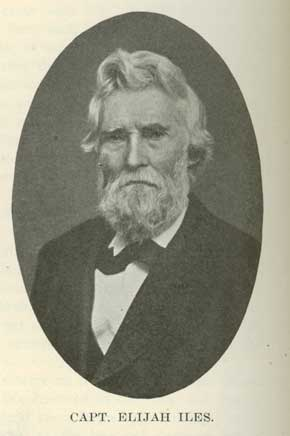
Elijah Iles born 28 March

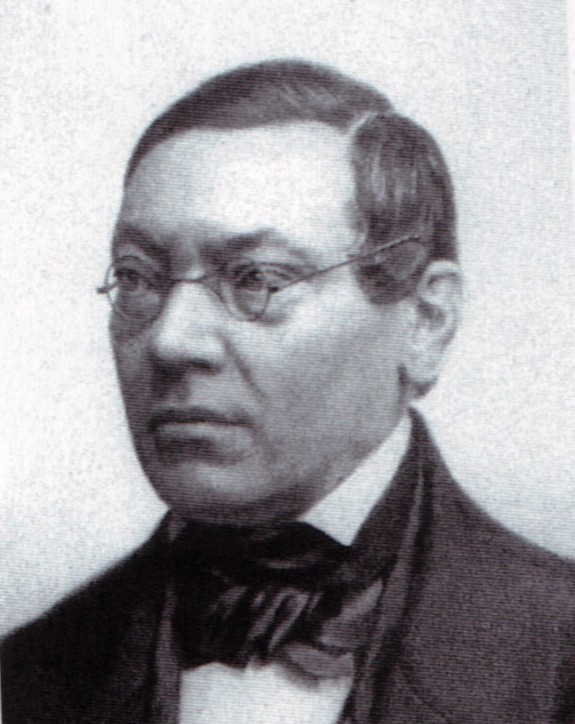
Theodor Brüggemann born 31 March

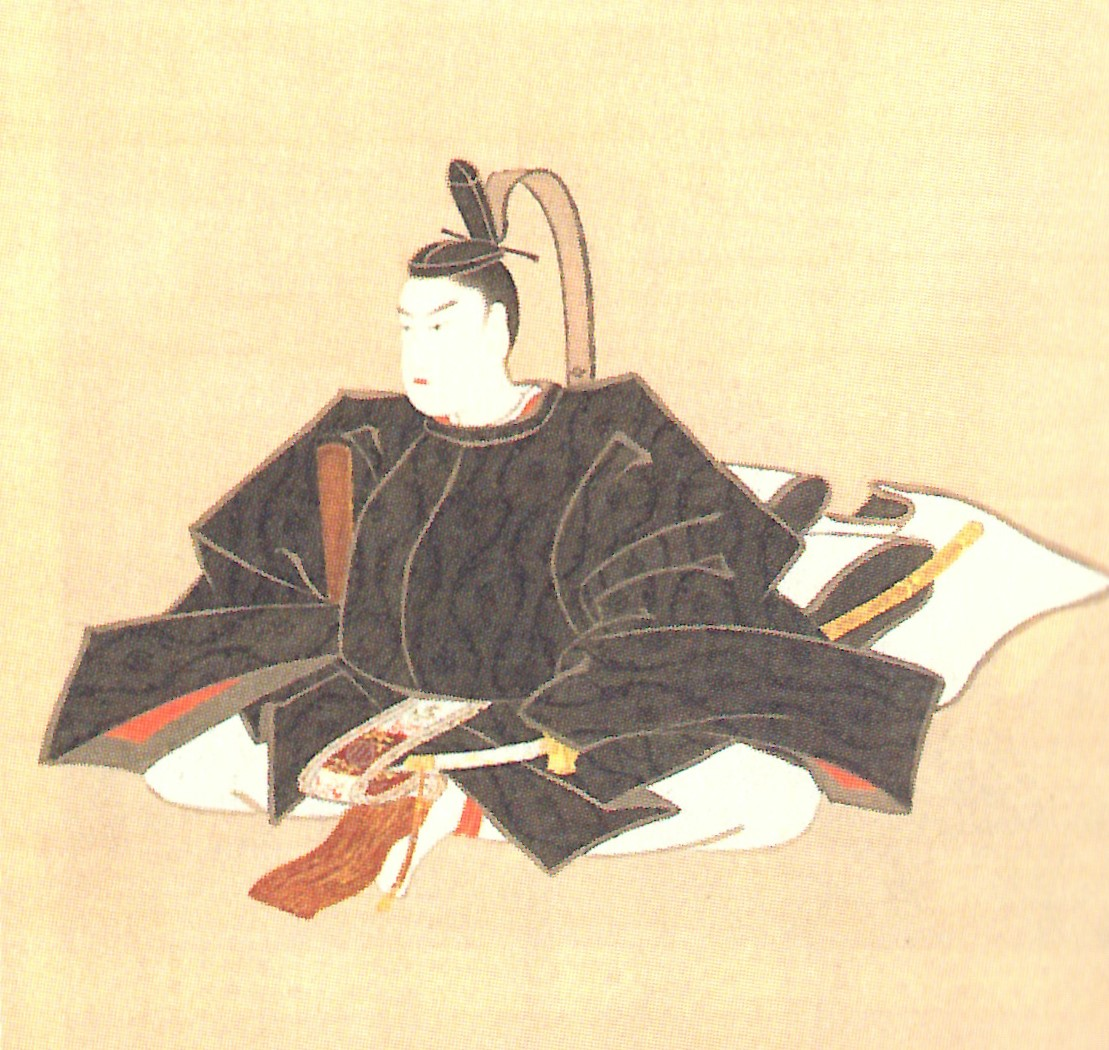
Date Chikamune born 9 April

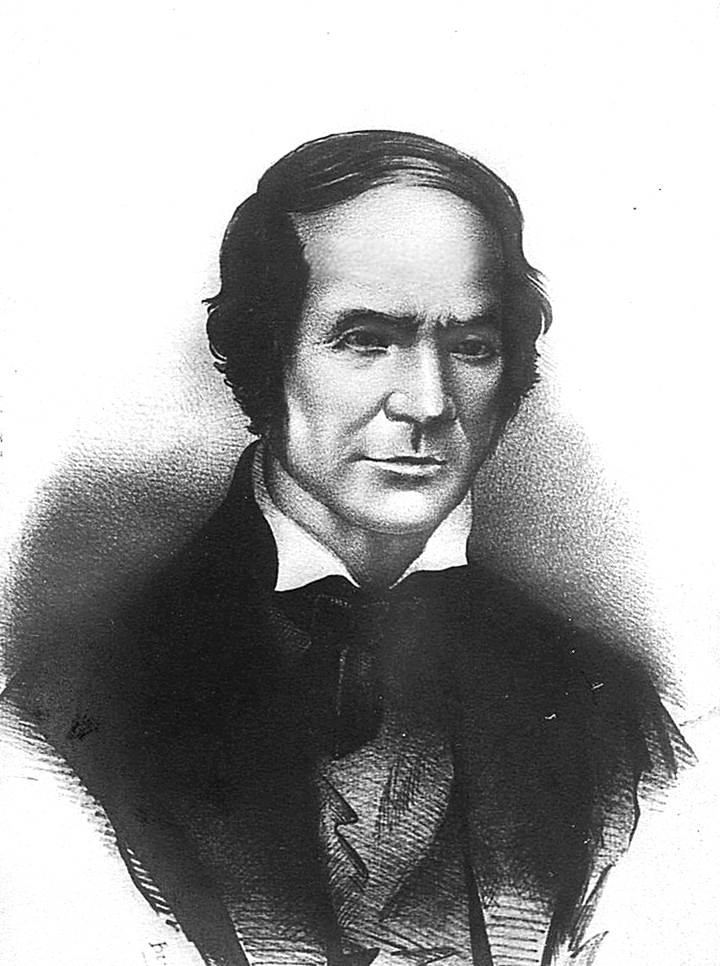
Stanisław Jachowicz born 17 April

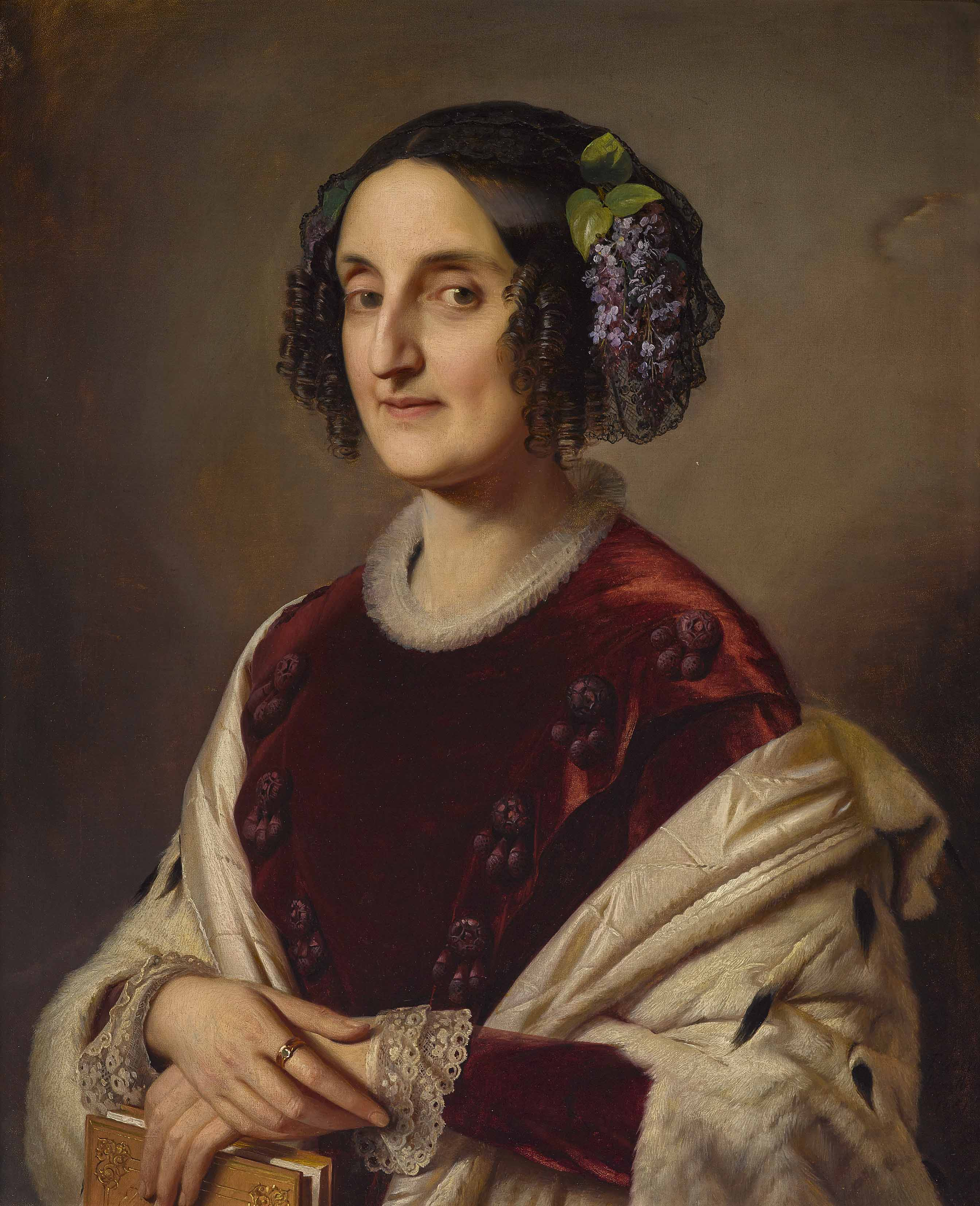
Princess Maria Ferdinanda of Saxony born 27 April

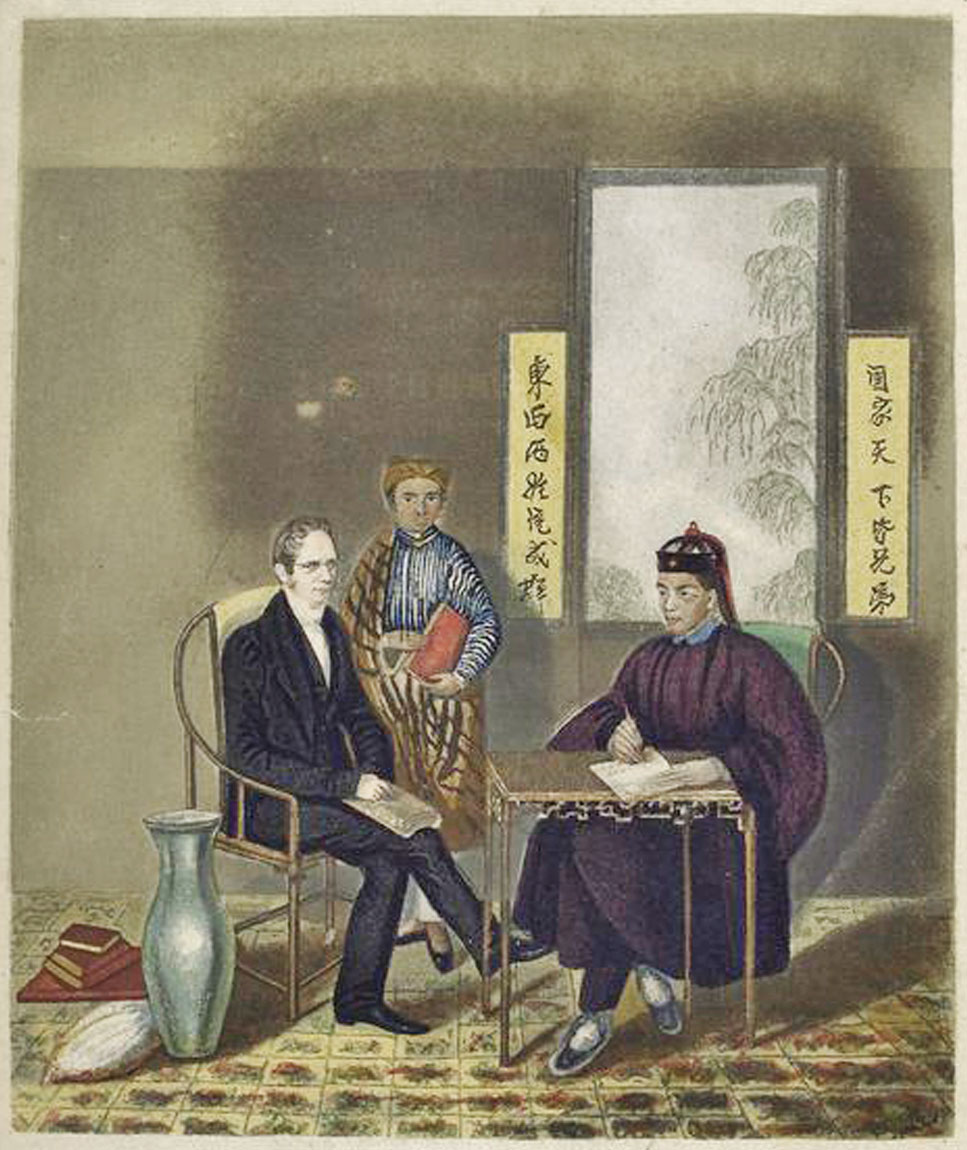
Walter Henry Medhurst born 29 April

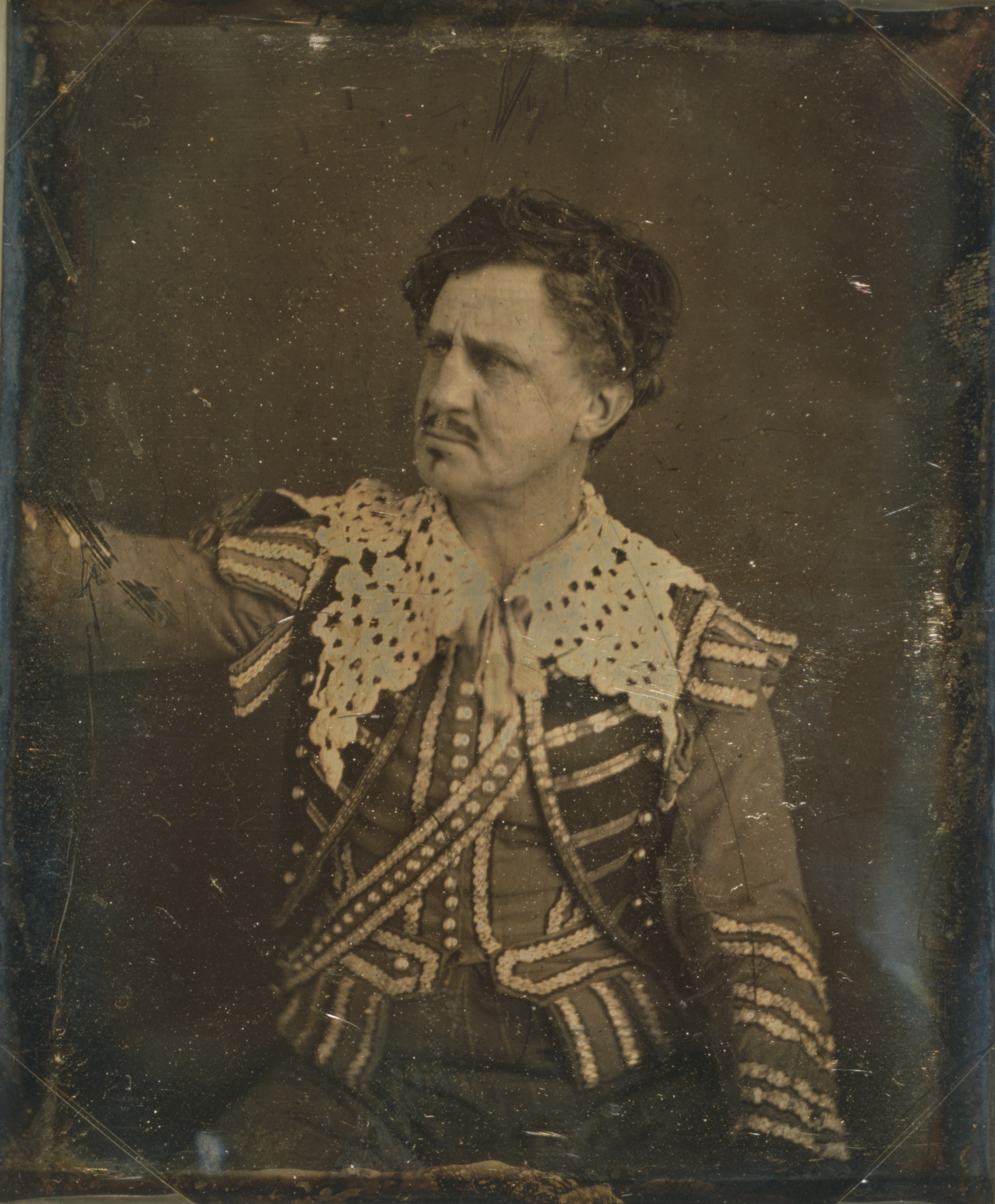
Junius Brutus Booth born 1 May

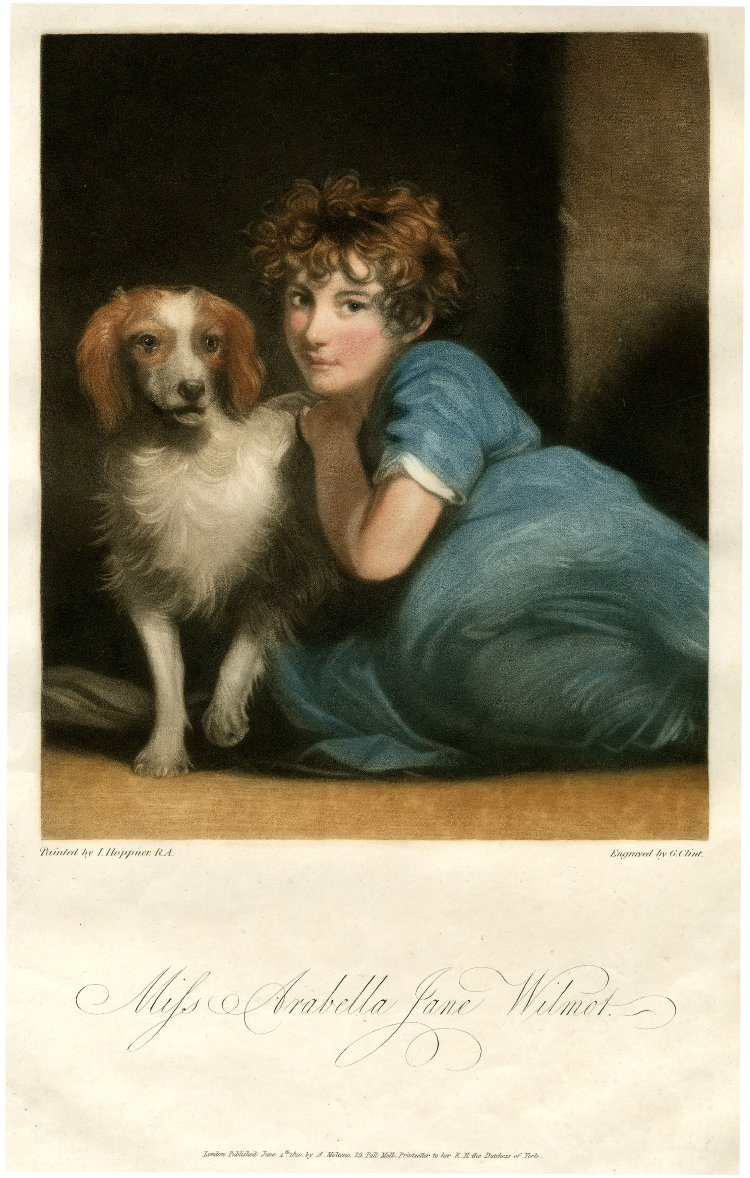
Arabella Sullivan born 1 May

Colm de Bhailís born 2 May

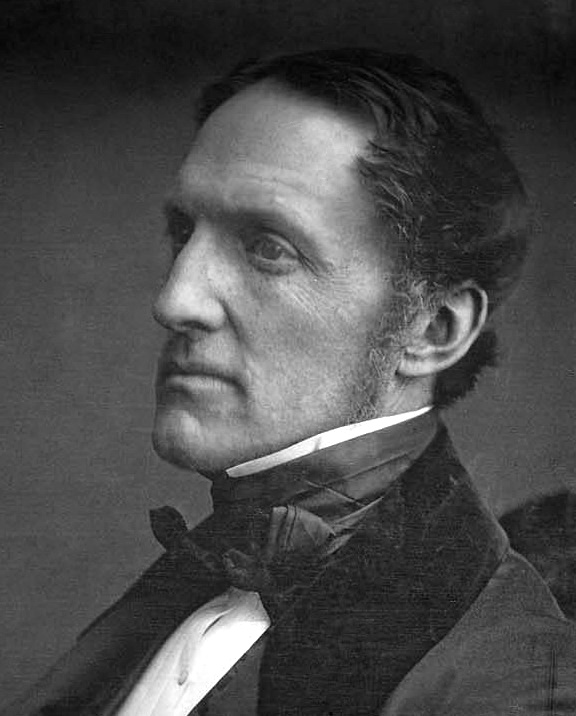
William H. Prescott born 4 May

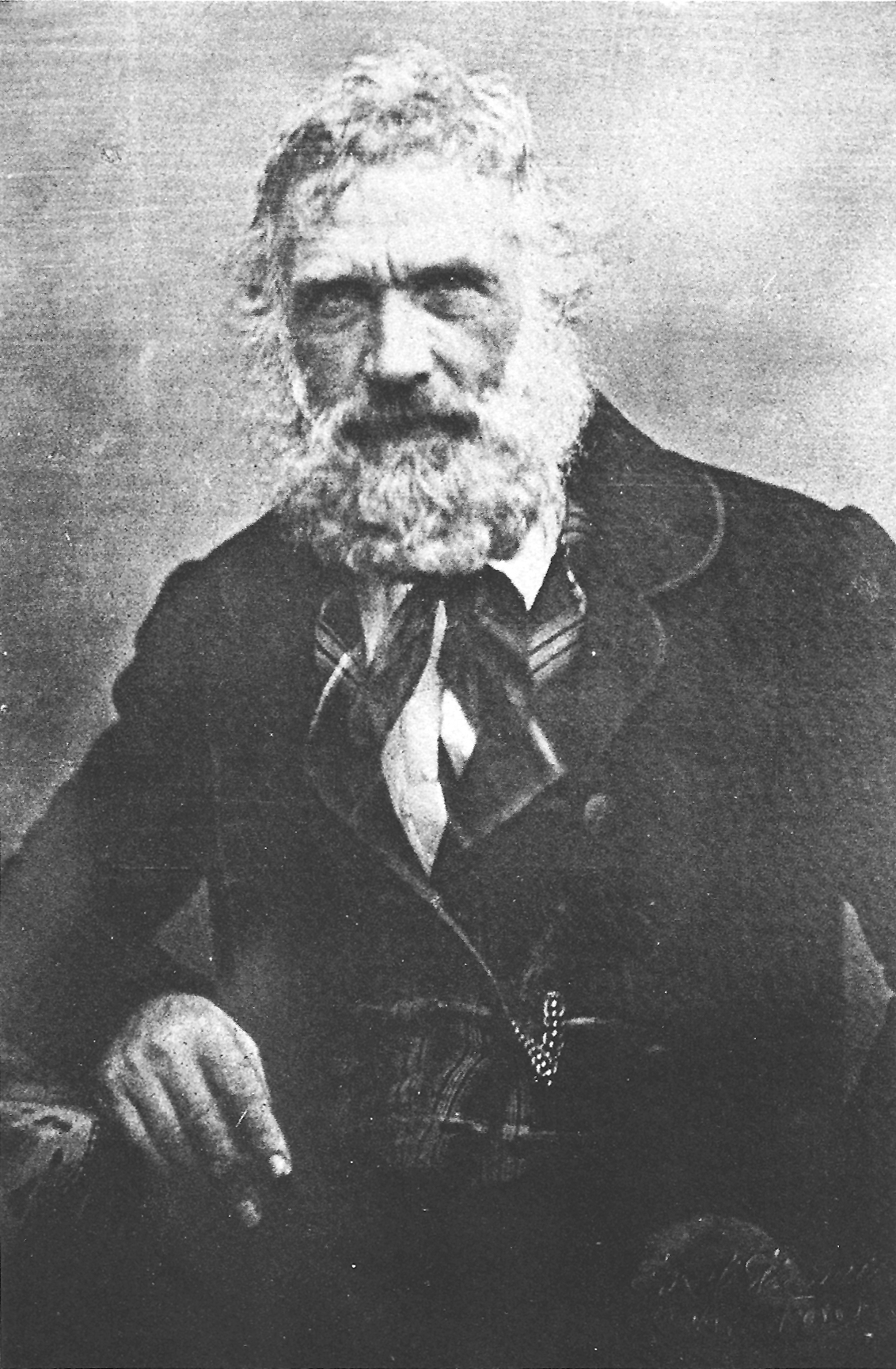
Johann Baptist Isenring born 12 May

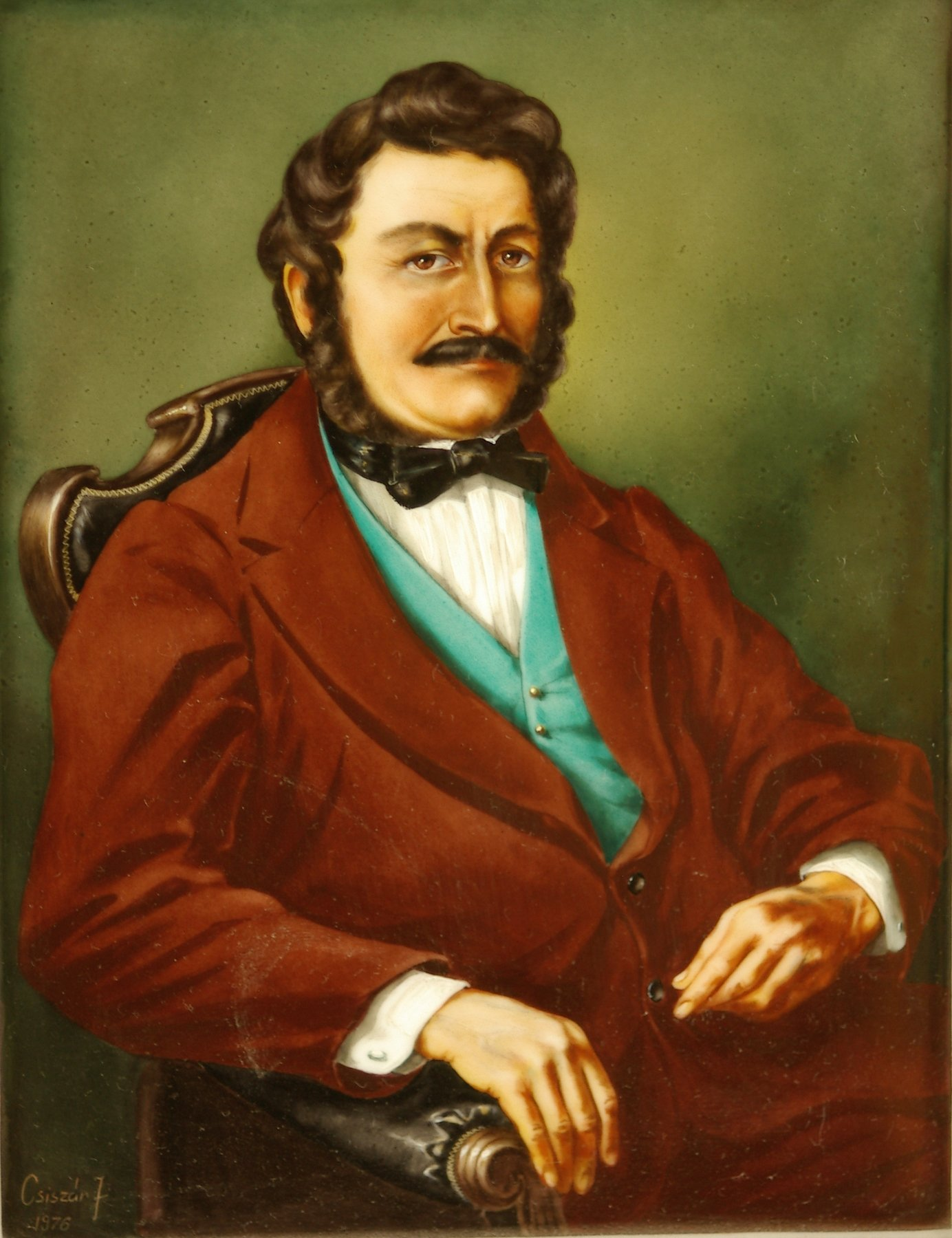
Vince Stingl born 23 May

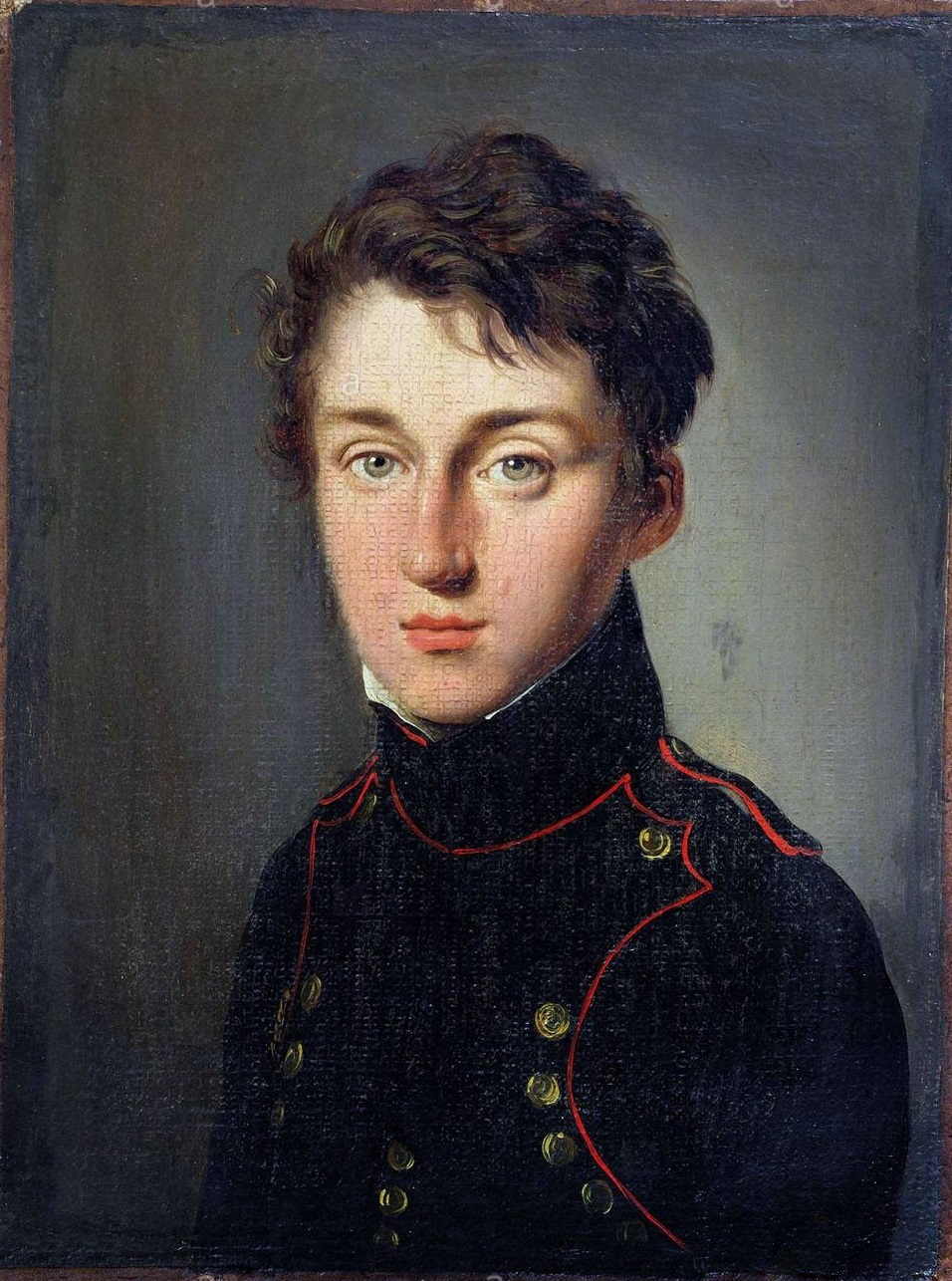
Nicolas Léonard Sadi Carnot born 1 June

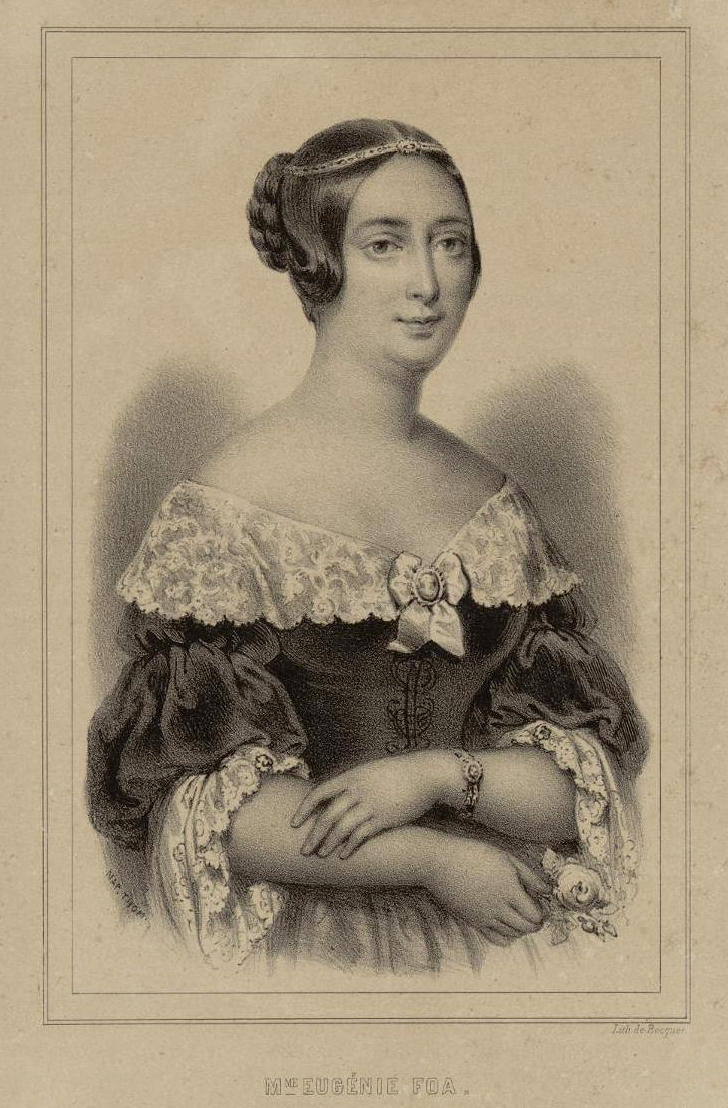
Eugénie Foa born 10 June

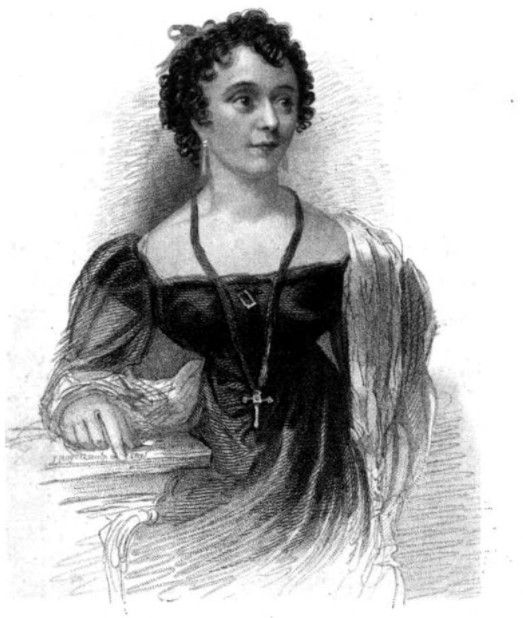
Mary Grimstone born 12 June

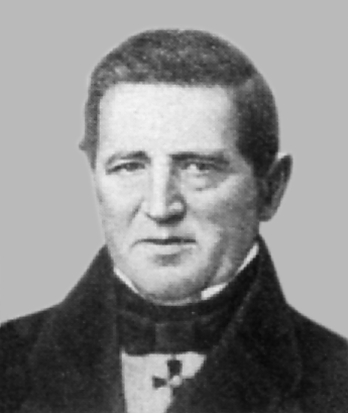
Nikolai Brashman born 14 June

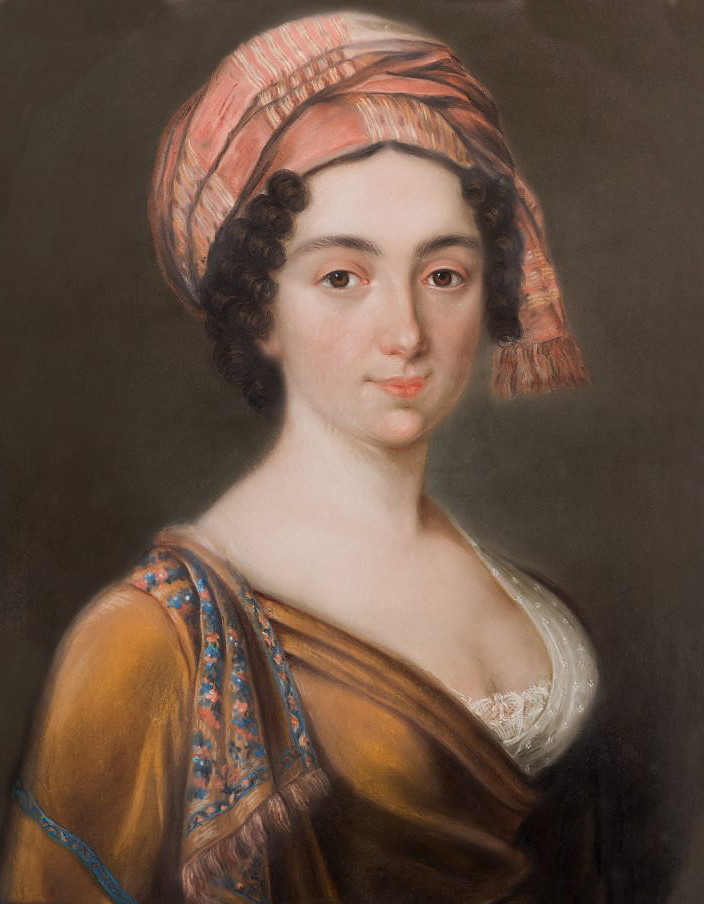
Mathilda d'Orozco born 14 June

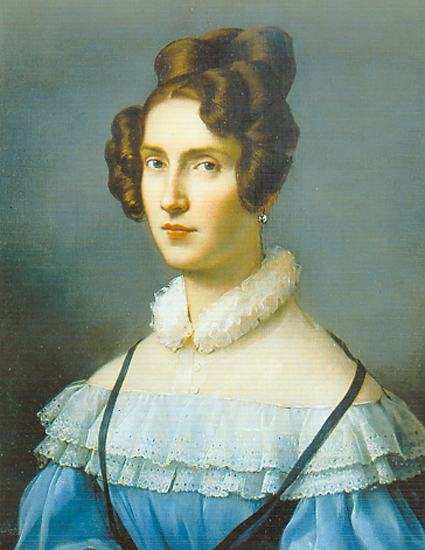
Carlotta Marchionni born 14 June

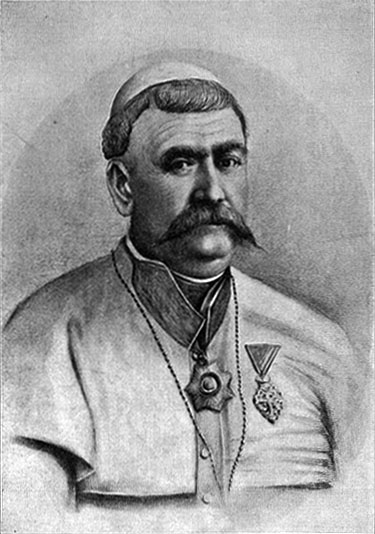
Rafael Barišić born 24 June

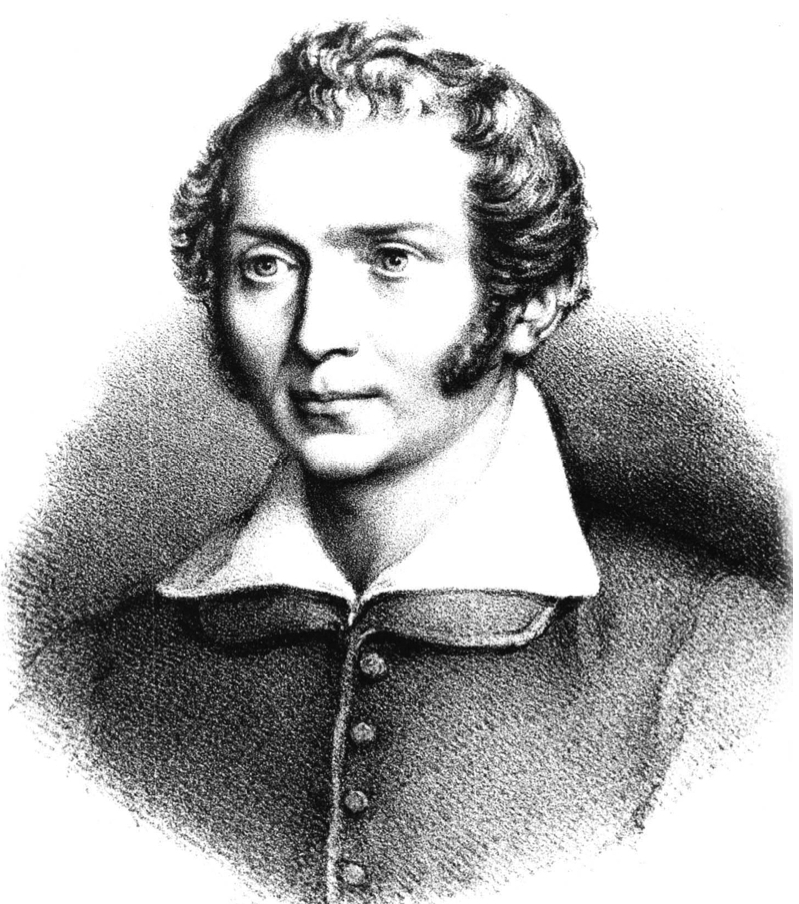
Ernst Mayer born 24 June

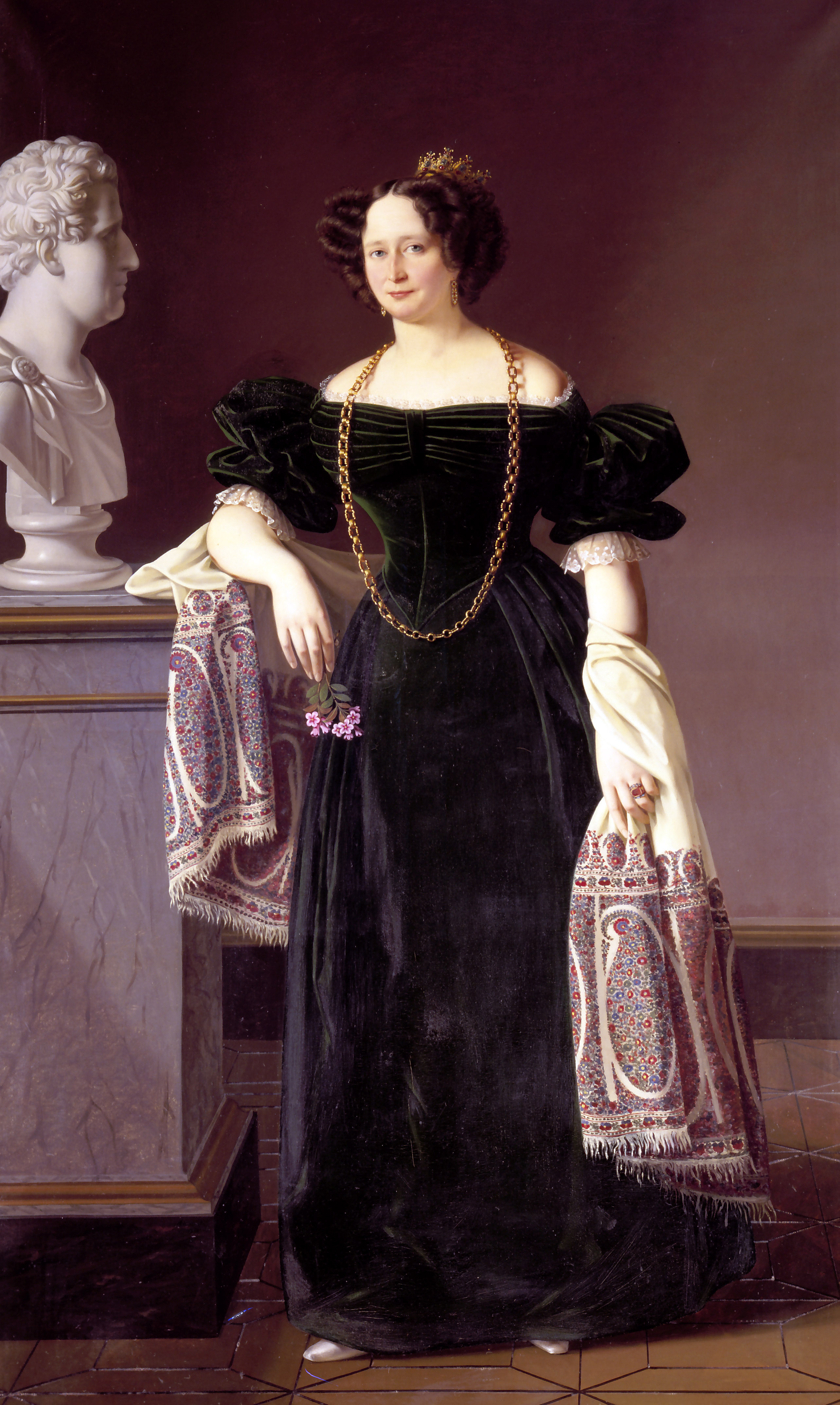
Caroline Amalie of Augustenburg born 28 June

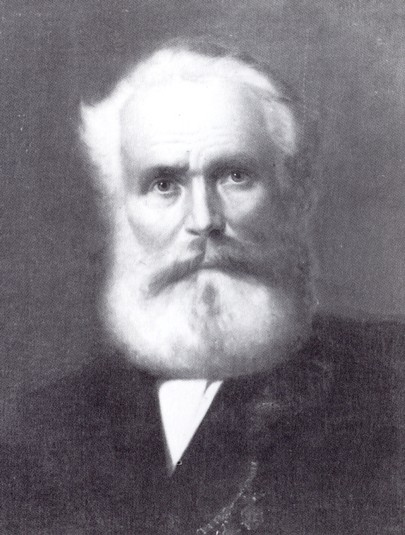
Michael Thonet born 2 July

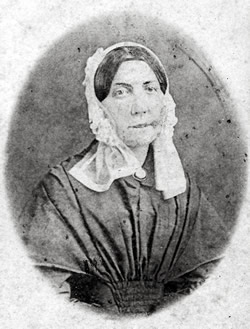
Maria Martin born 6 July

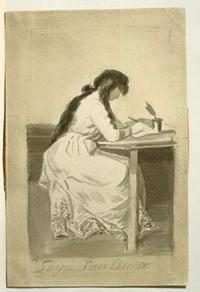
María Josefa García Granados born 10 July

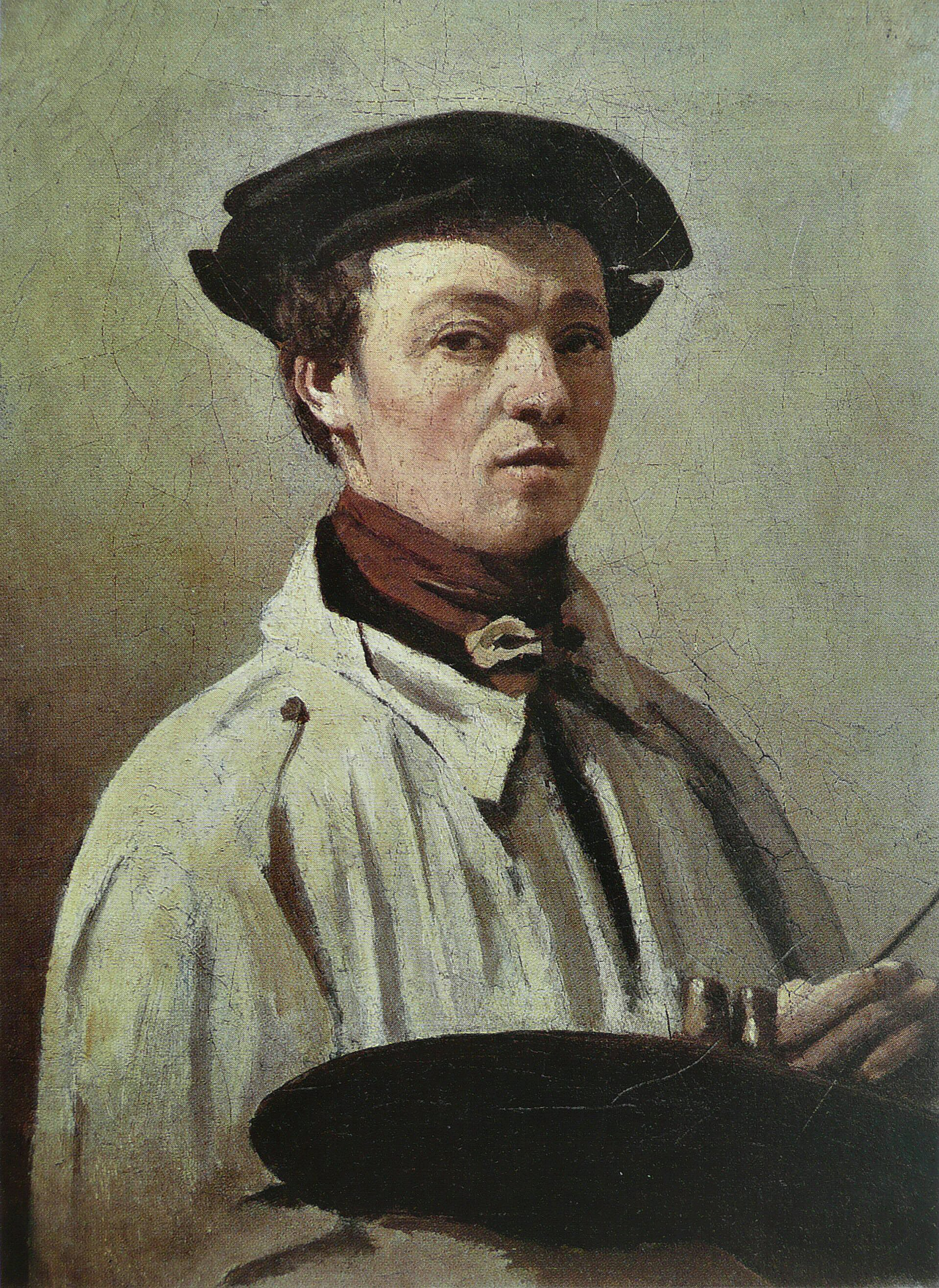
Jean-Baptiste-Camille Corot born 16 July

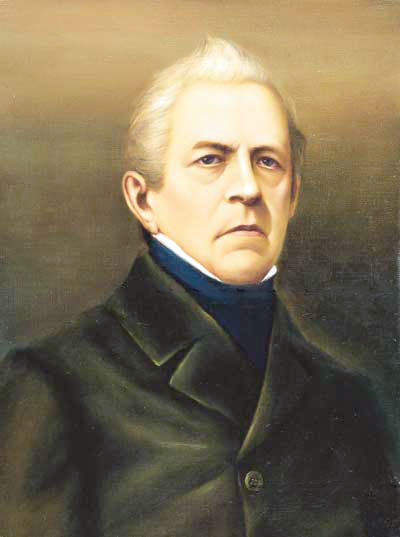
Franz Berwald born 23 July

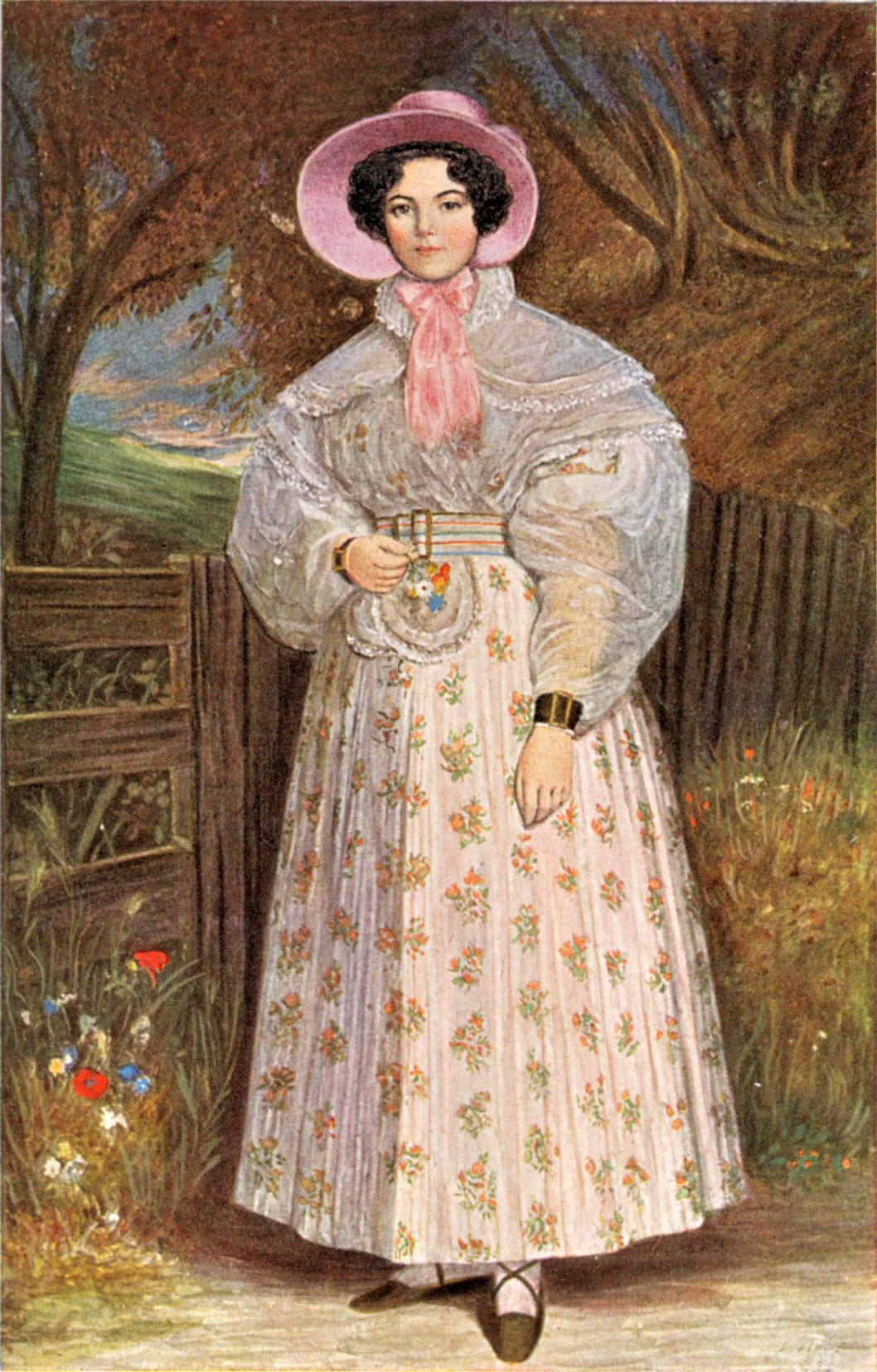
Lizinska de Mirbel born 26 July

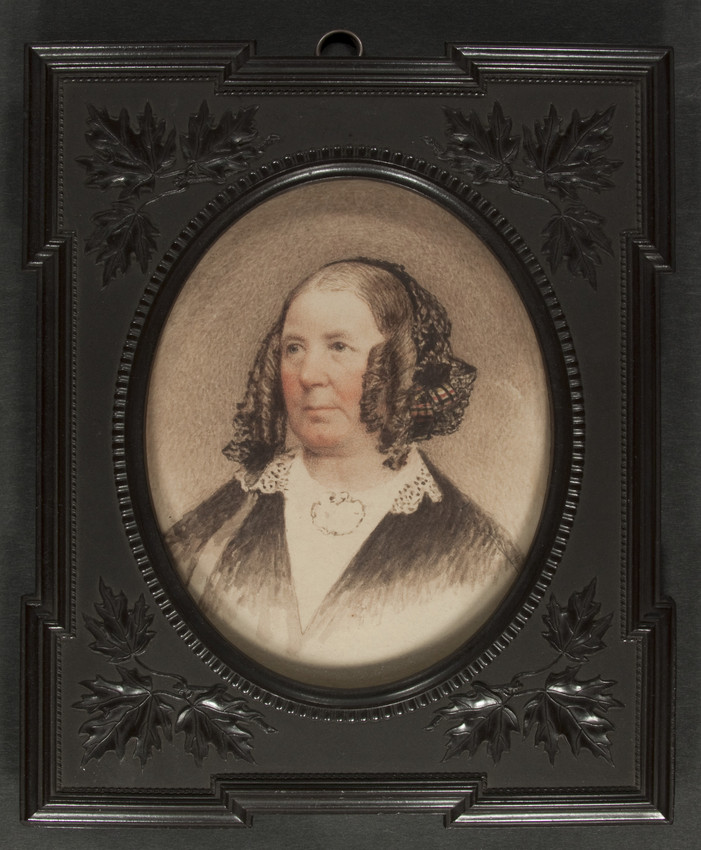
Eliza Henderson Boardman Otis born 27 July

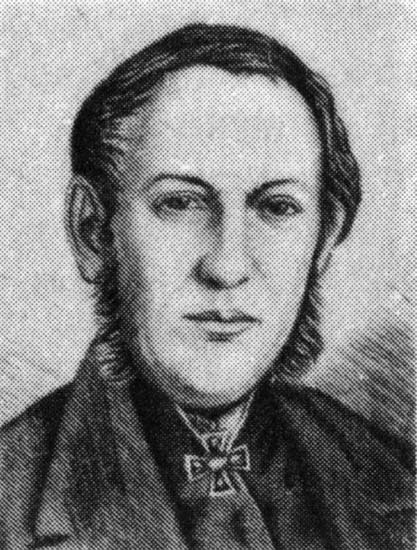
Pavel Stroyev born 27 July

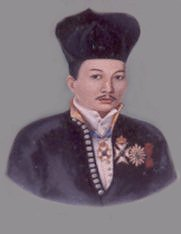
Pakubuwono VII born 28 July

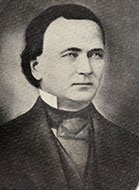
Walter Hunt born 29 July

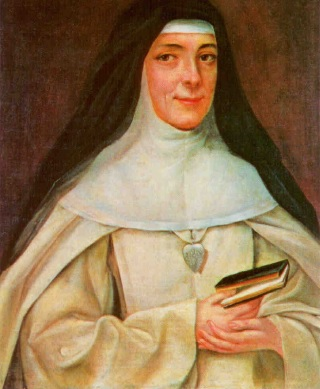
Mary Euphrasia Pelletier born 31 July

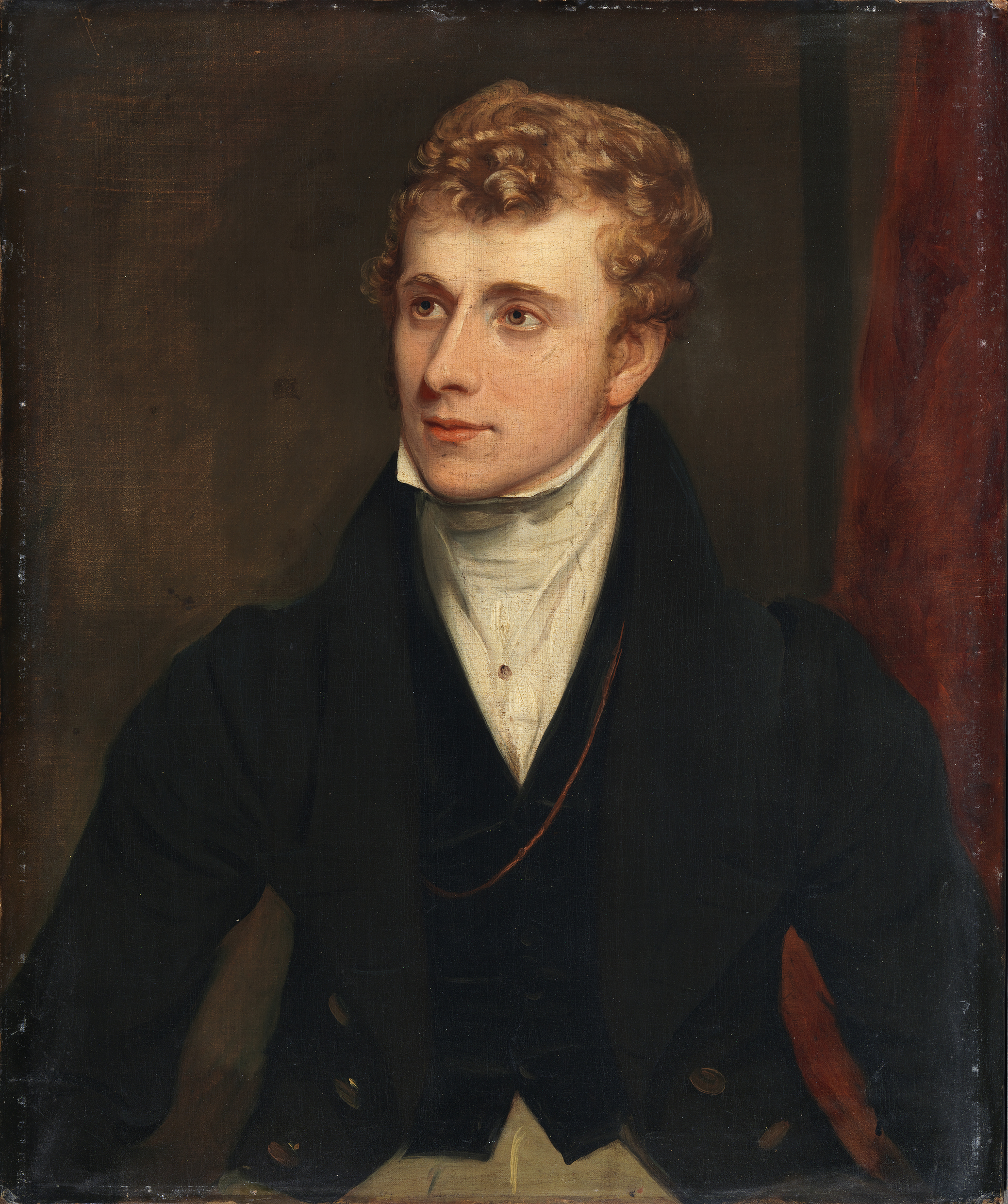
Michael Banim born 5 August

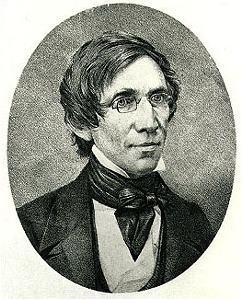
John Torrey born 15 August

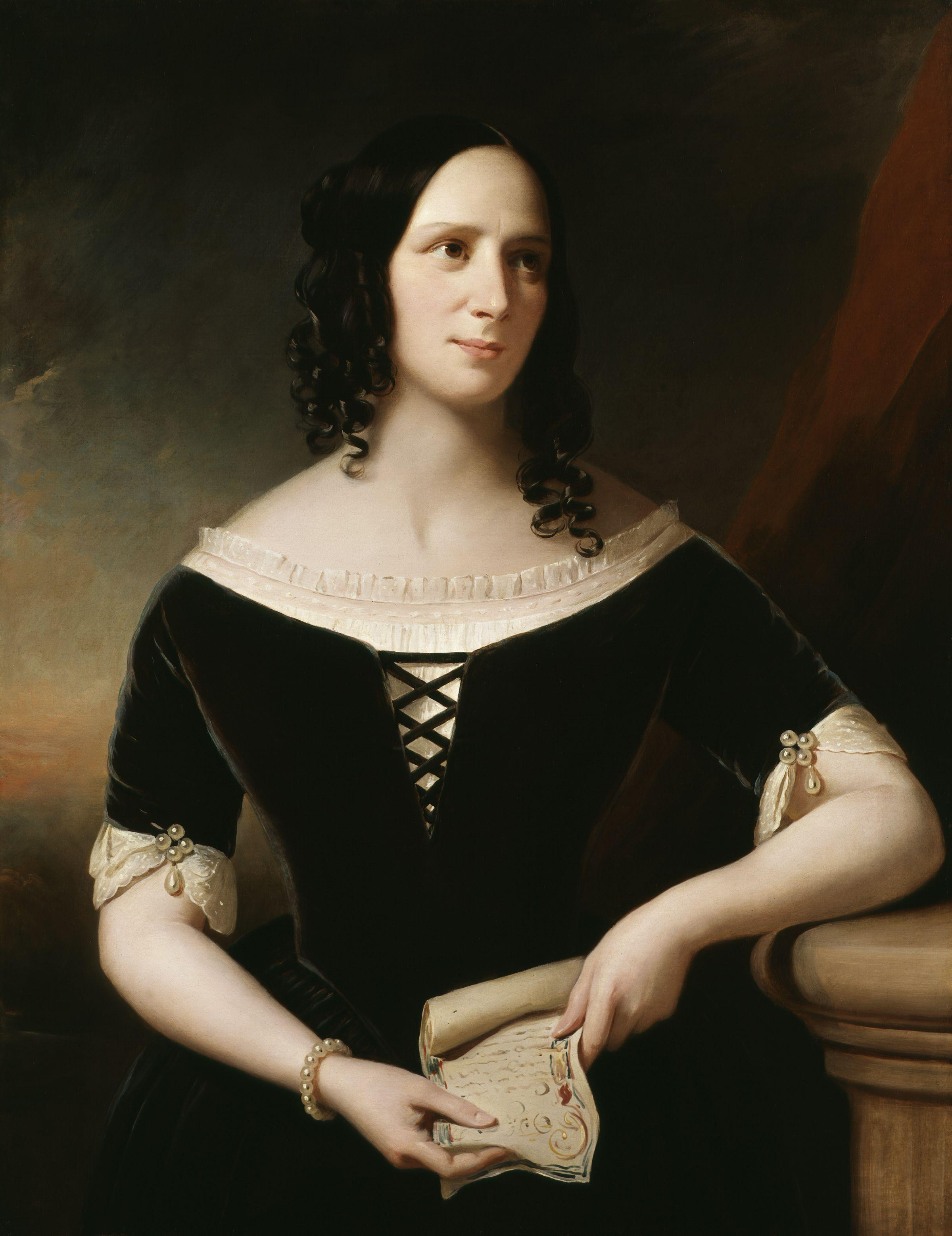
Agnes Strickland born 19 August

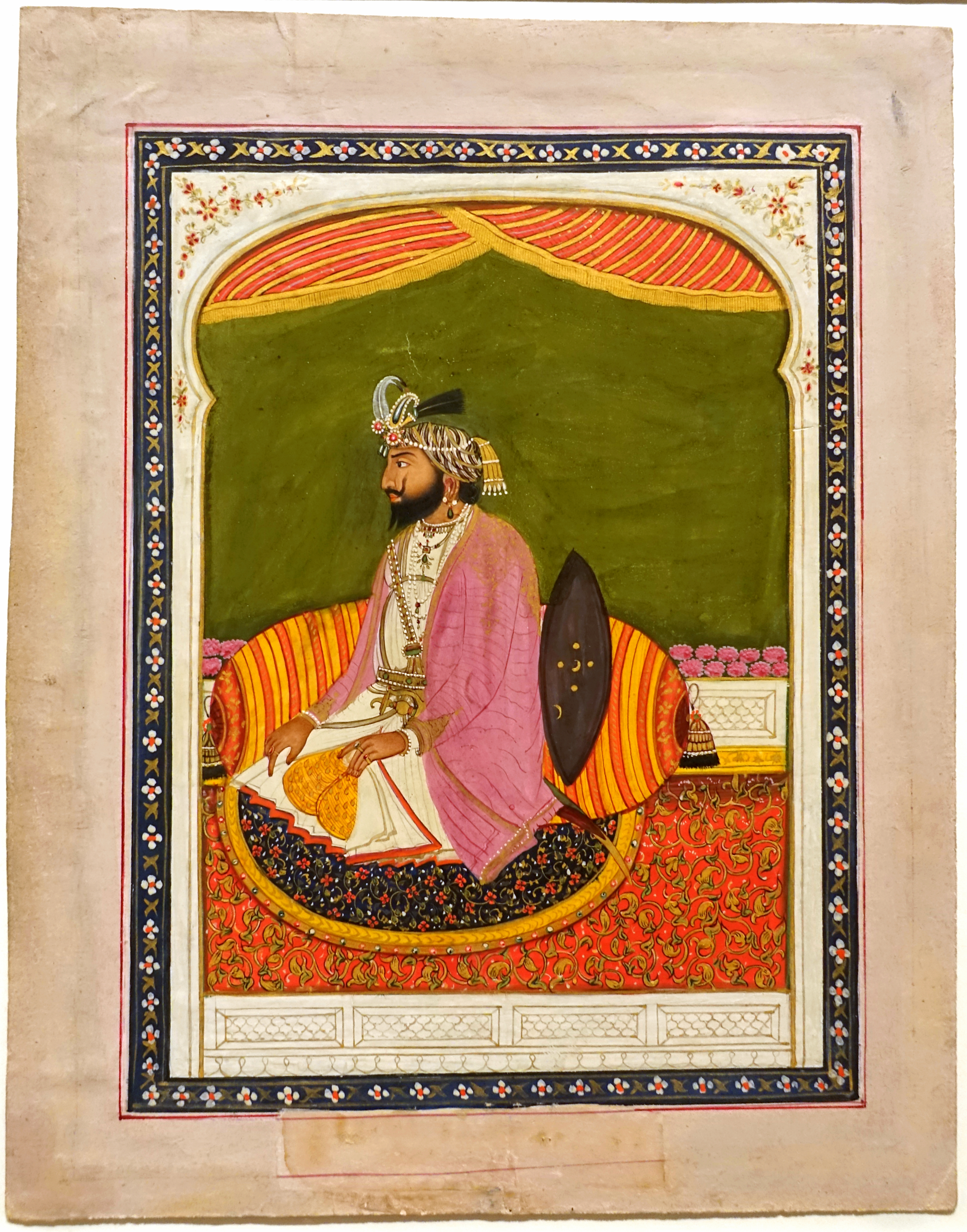
Dhian Singh born 22 August

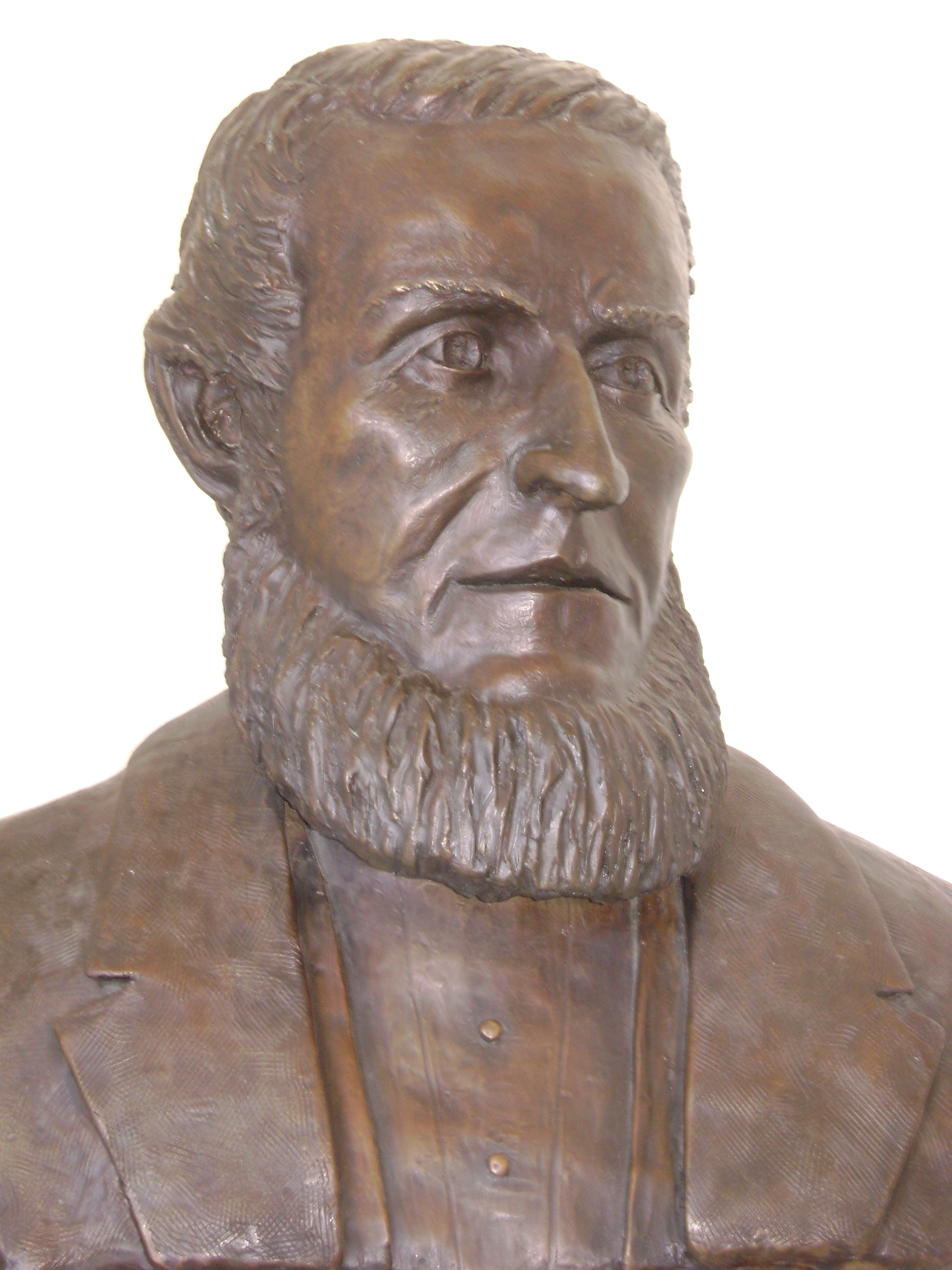
James Lick born 25 August

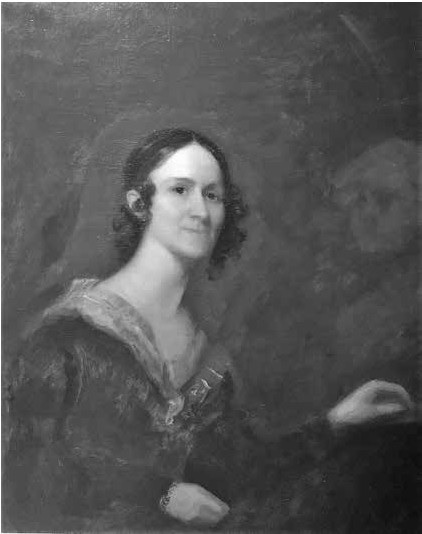
Joanna Quiner born 27 August

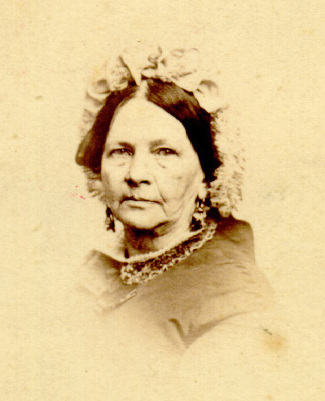
Sophia Smith (Smith College) born 27 August

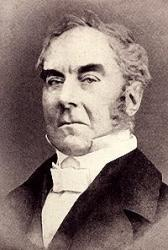
William Hiley Bathurst born 28 August

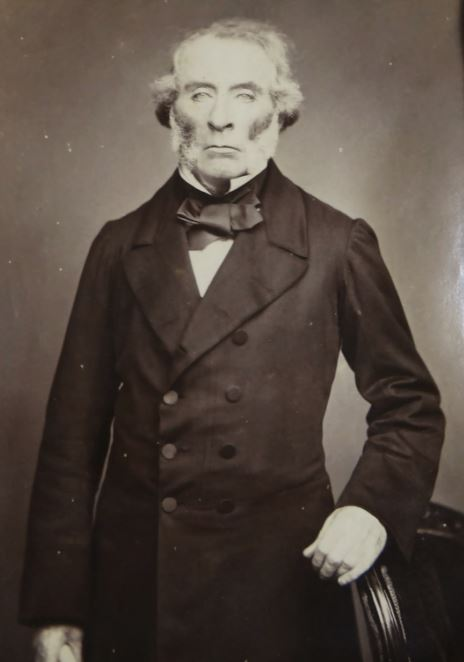
James Apjohn born 1 September

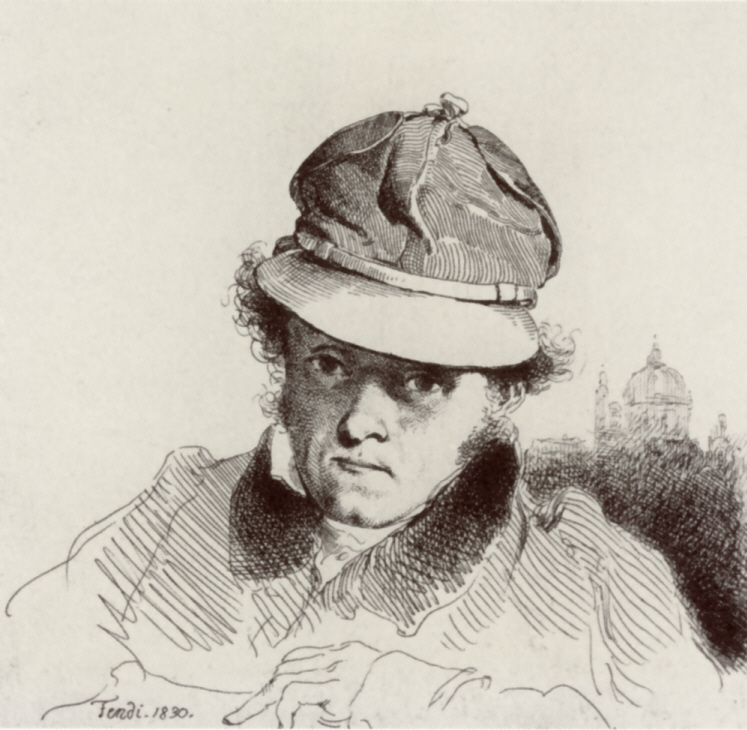
Peter Fendi born 4 September

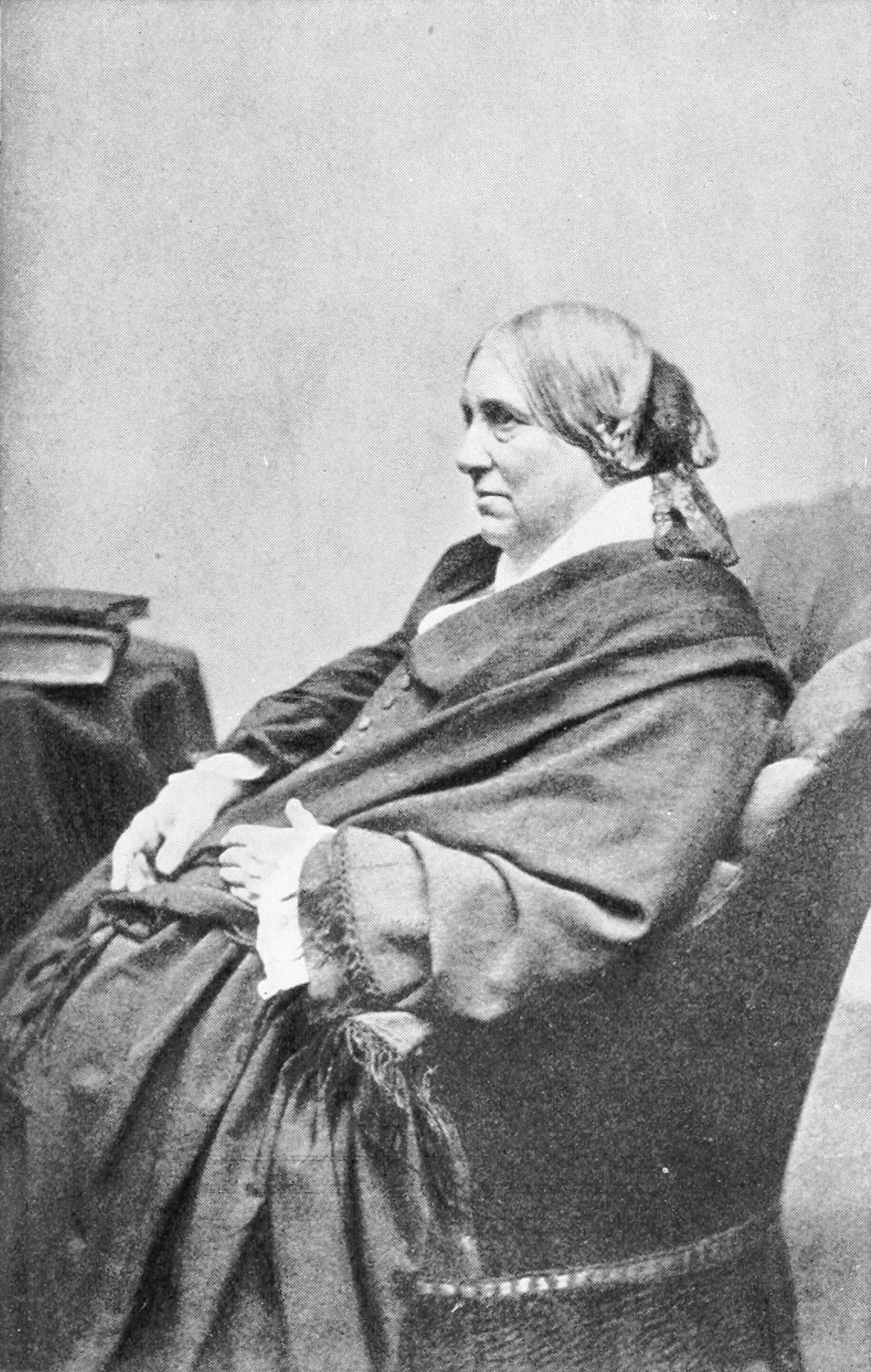
Sarah Preston Hale born 5 September

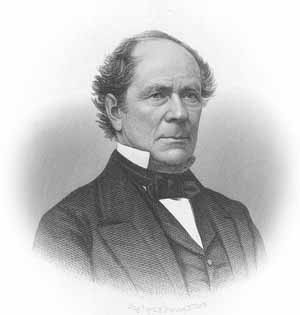
Uriel Crocker born 12 September

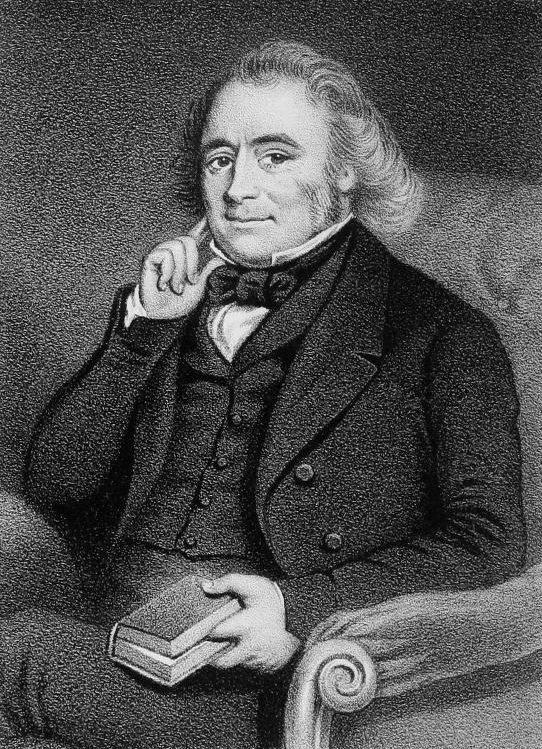
Hartley Coleridge born 19 September

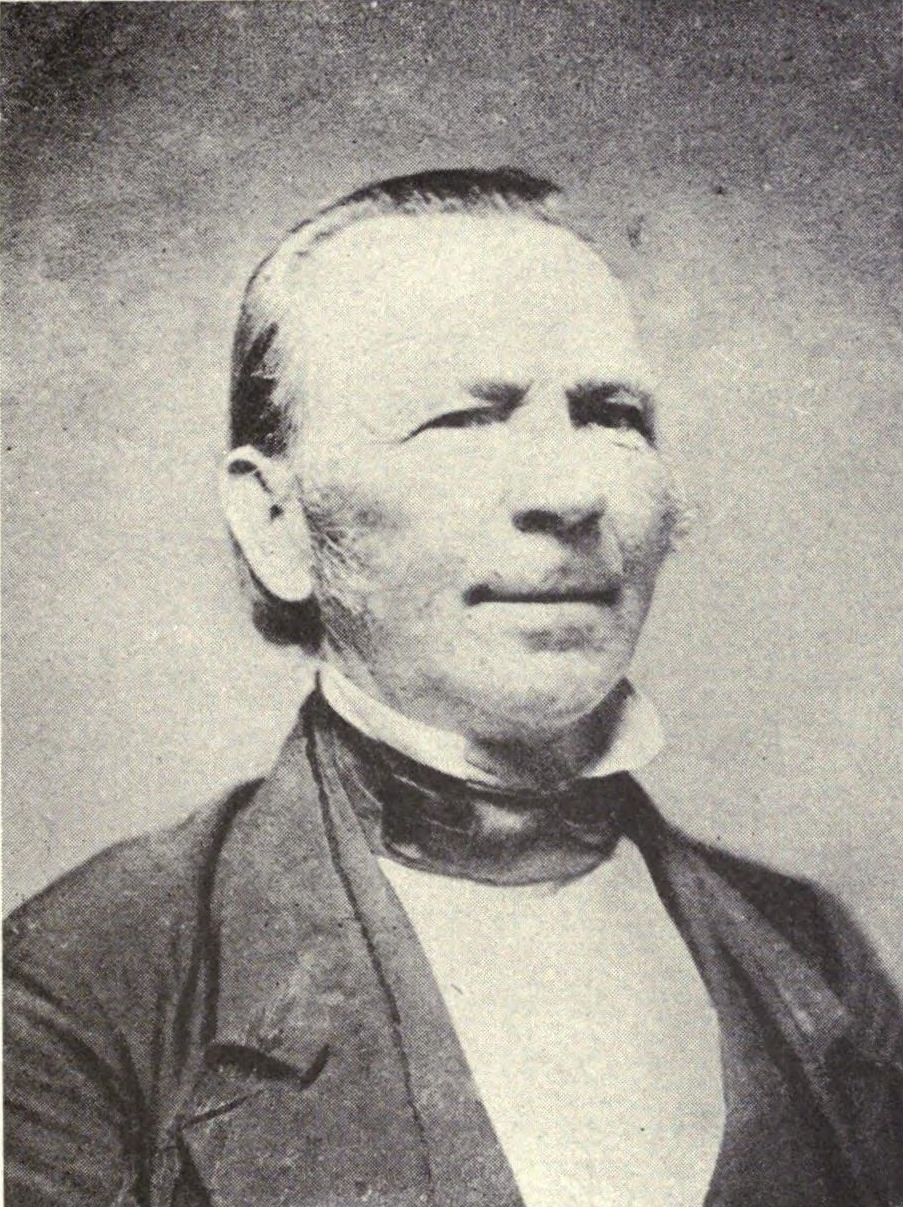
Jonathan Smith Green born 29 September

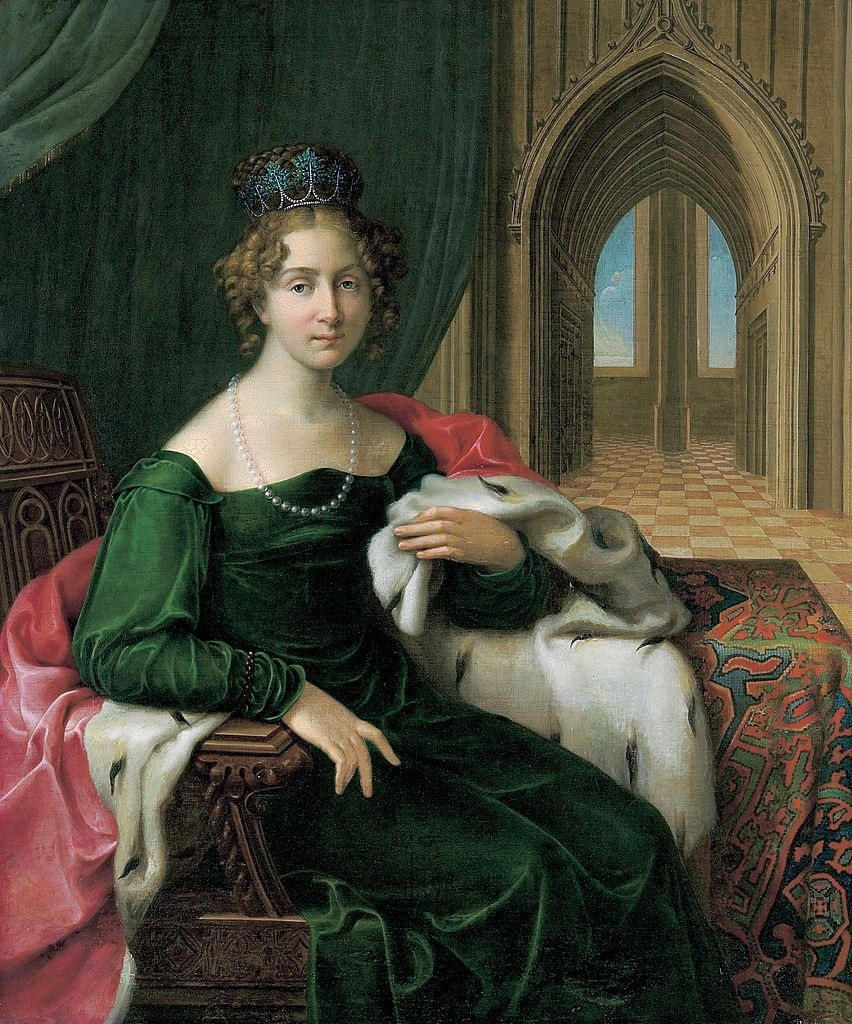
Princess Frederica of Prussia, Duchess of Anhalt-Dessau born 30 September

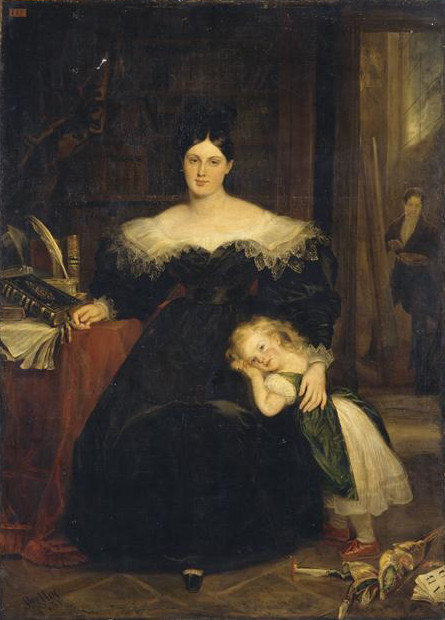
Louise Swanton Belloc born 1 October

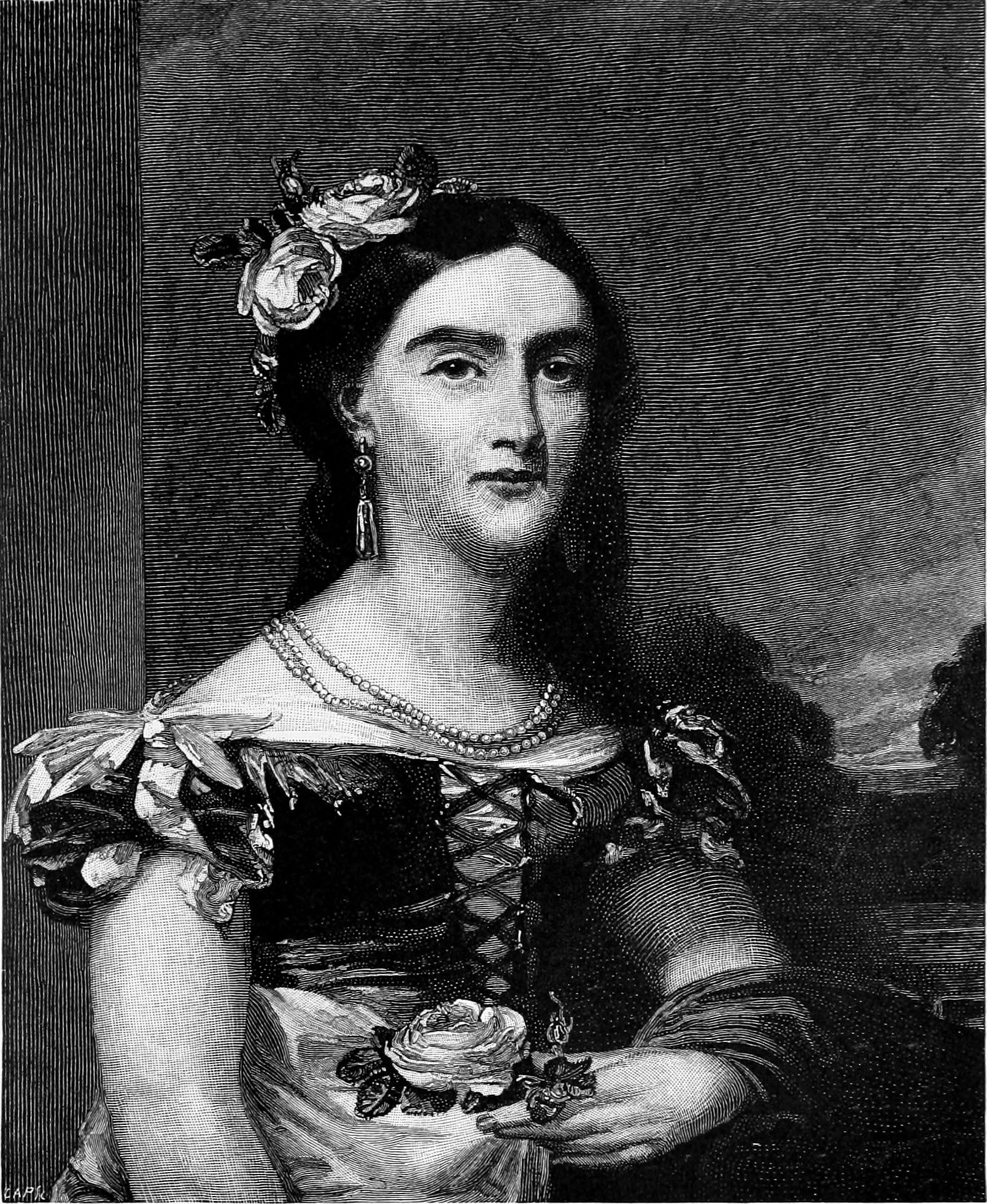
Cornelia Frances Jefferson born 1 October

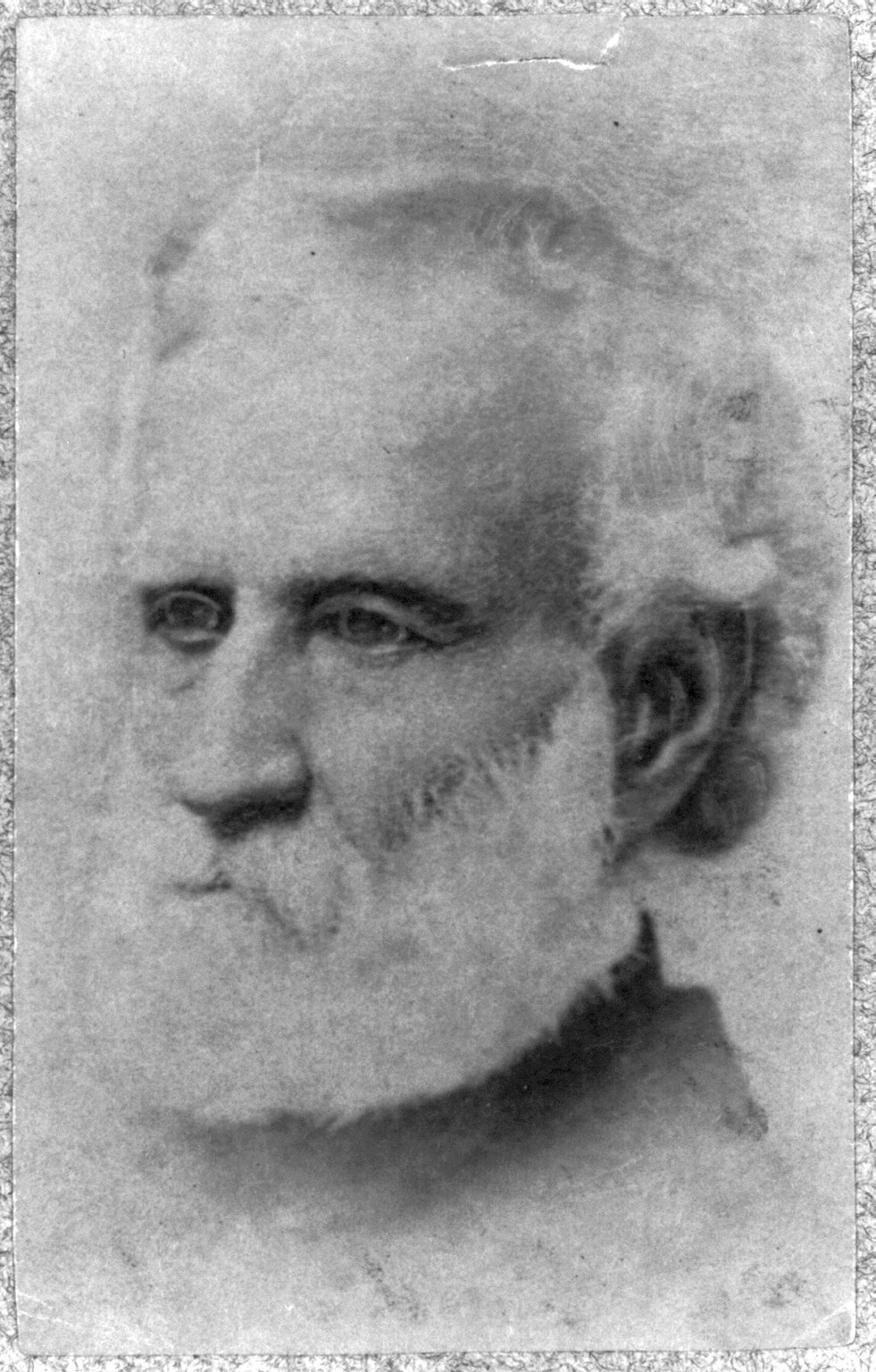
Thomas T. Fauntleroy (soldier) born 6 October

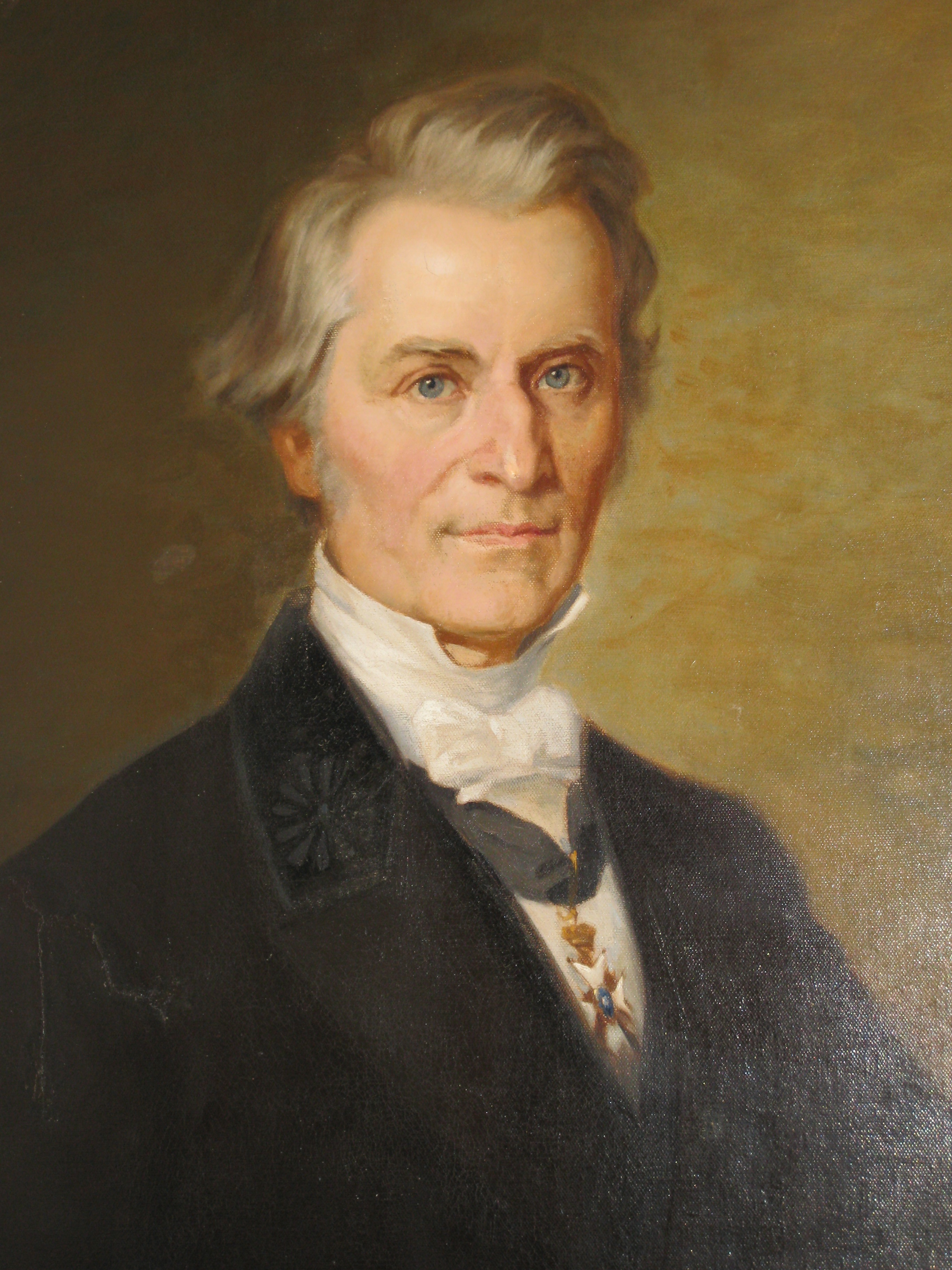
Anders Retzius born 13 October

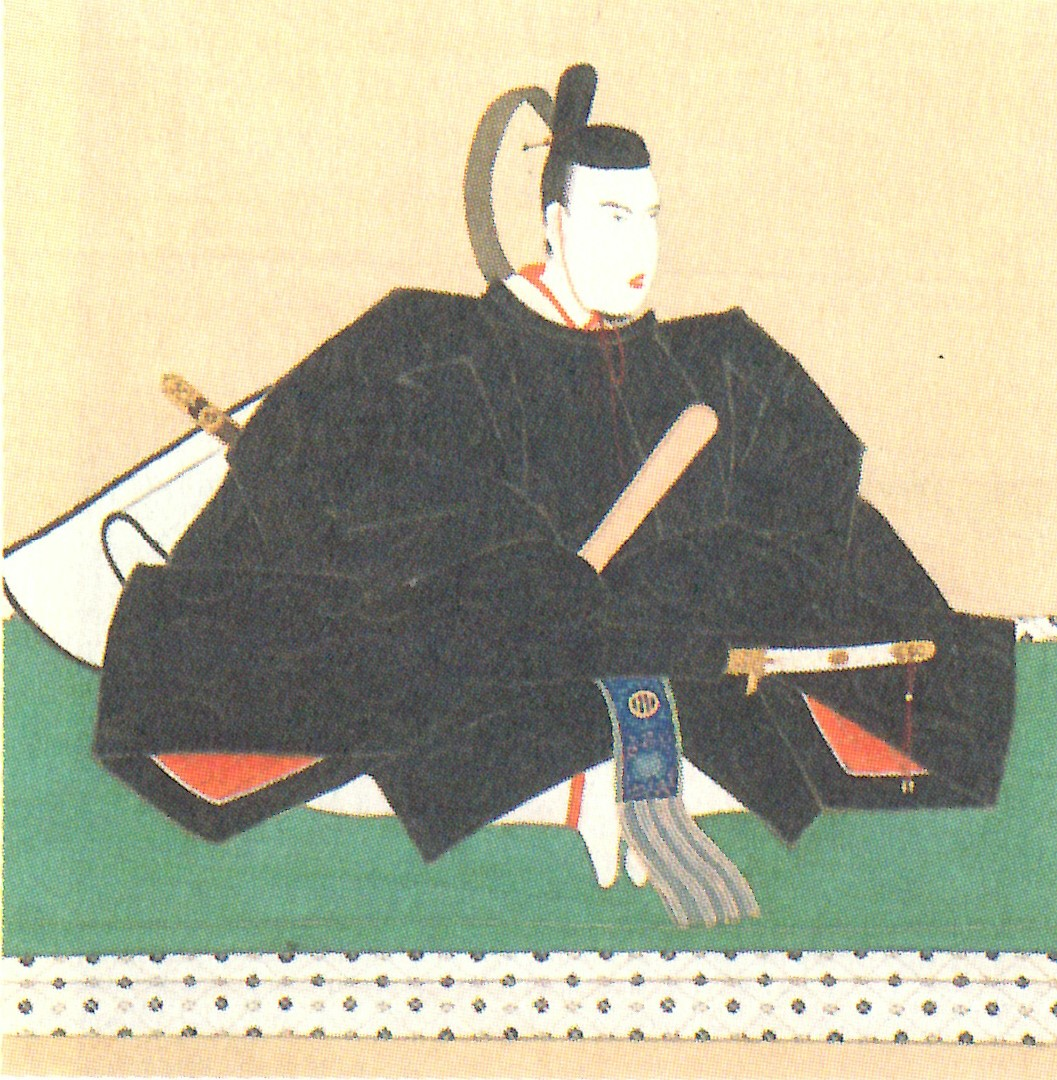
Date Narimune born 15 October

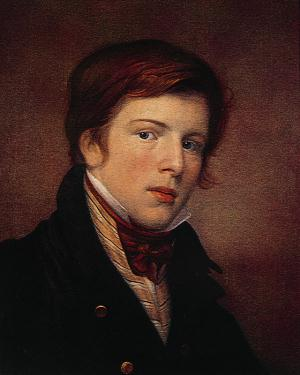
Leopold Kupelwieser born 17 October

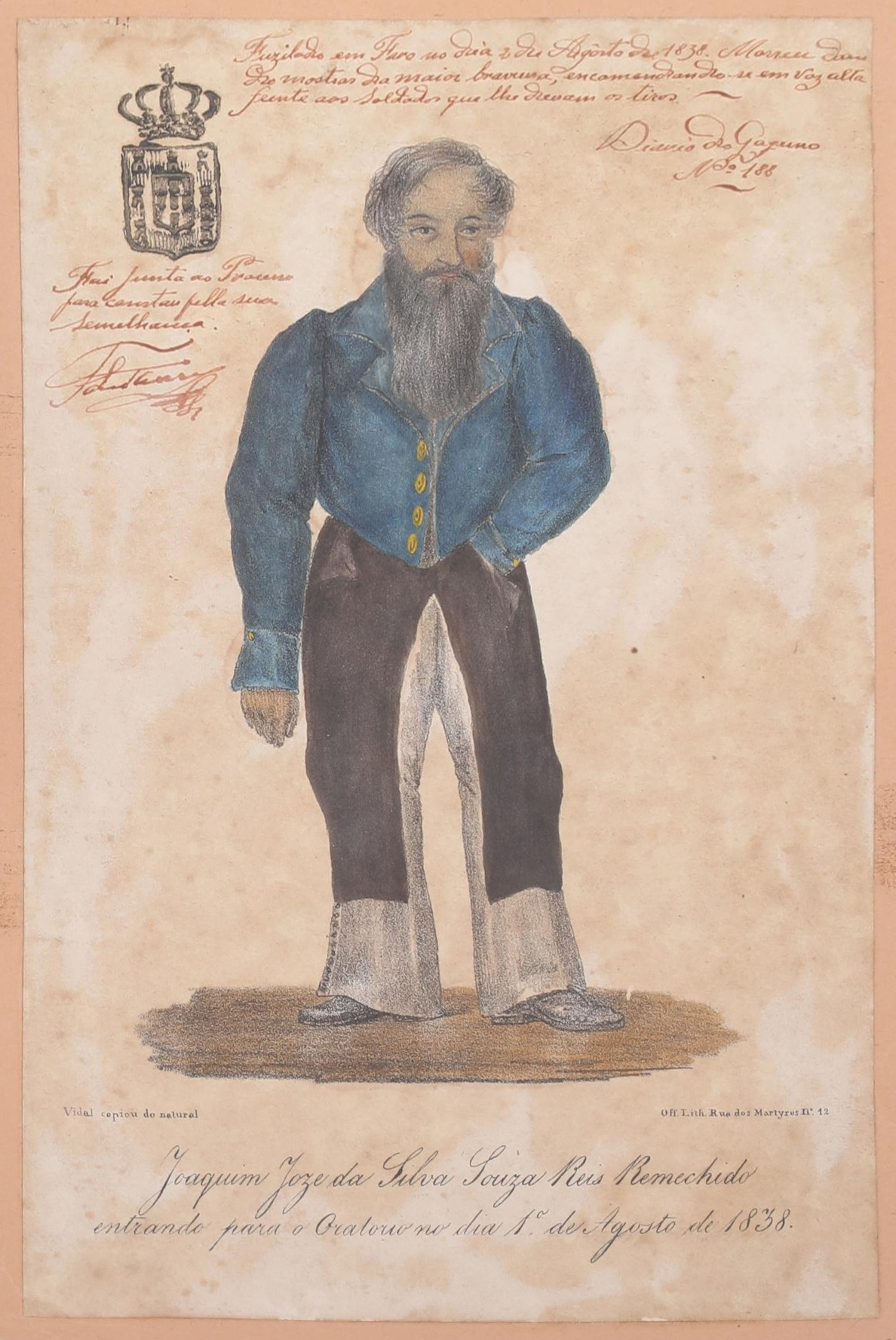
Remexido born 19 October

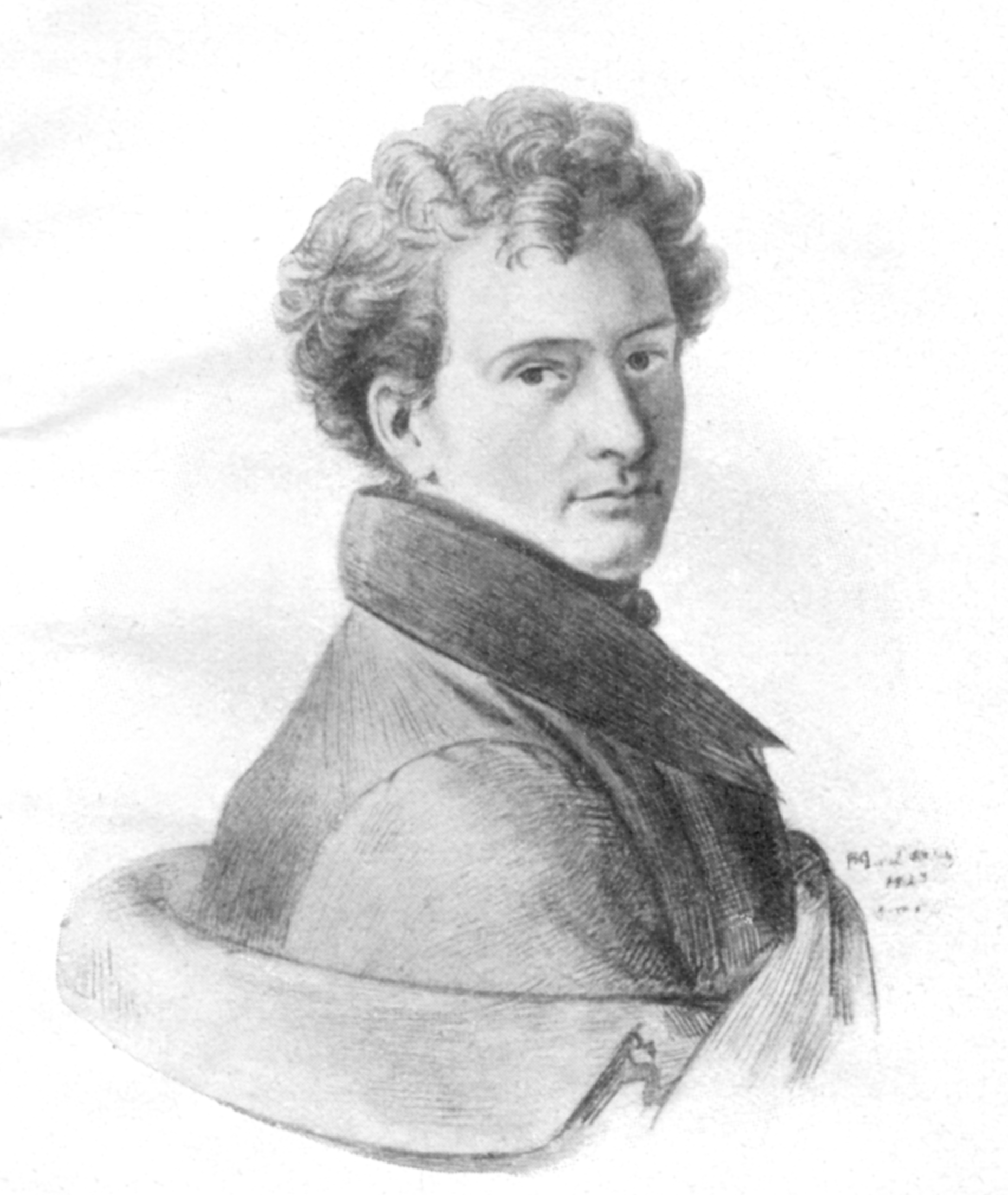
Gottfried Osann born 26 October

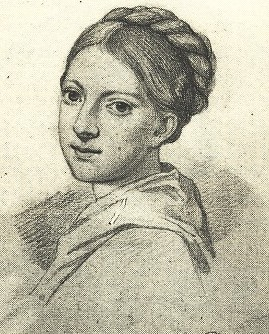
Ottilie von Goethe born 31 October

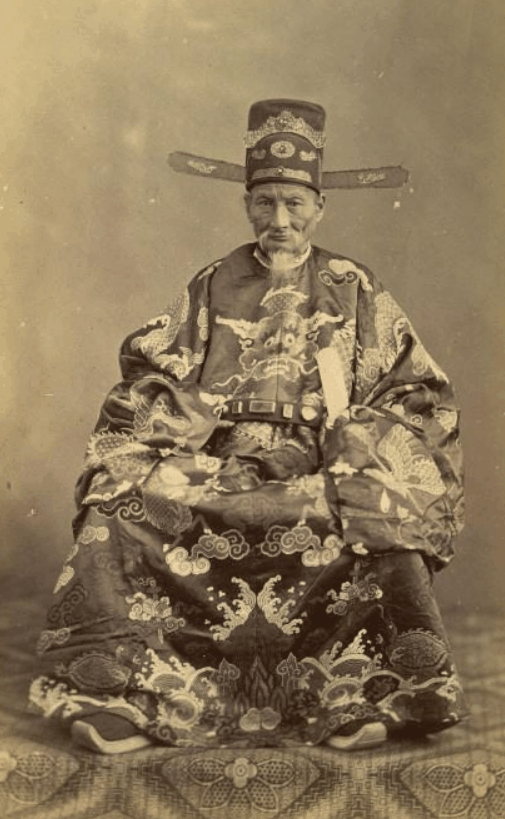
Phan Thanh Giản born 11 November

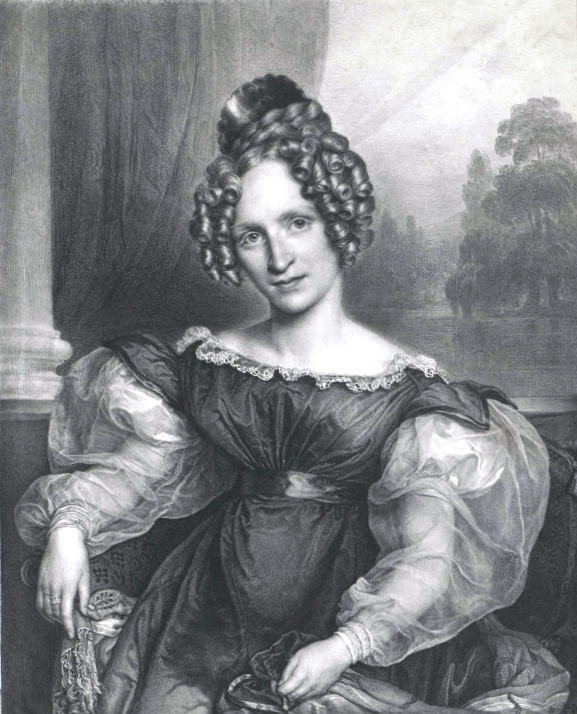
Friederike Funk born 14 November

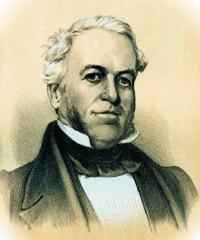
Henry Dangar born 18 November

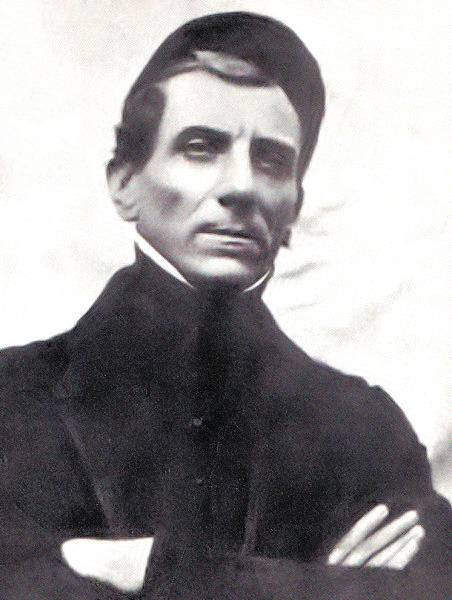
Stephan Ludwig Roth born 24 November

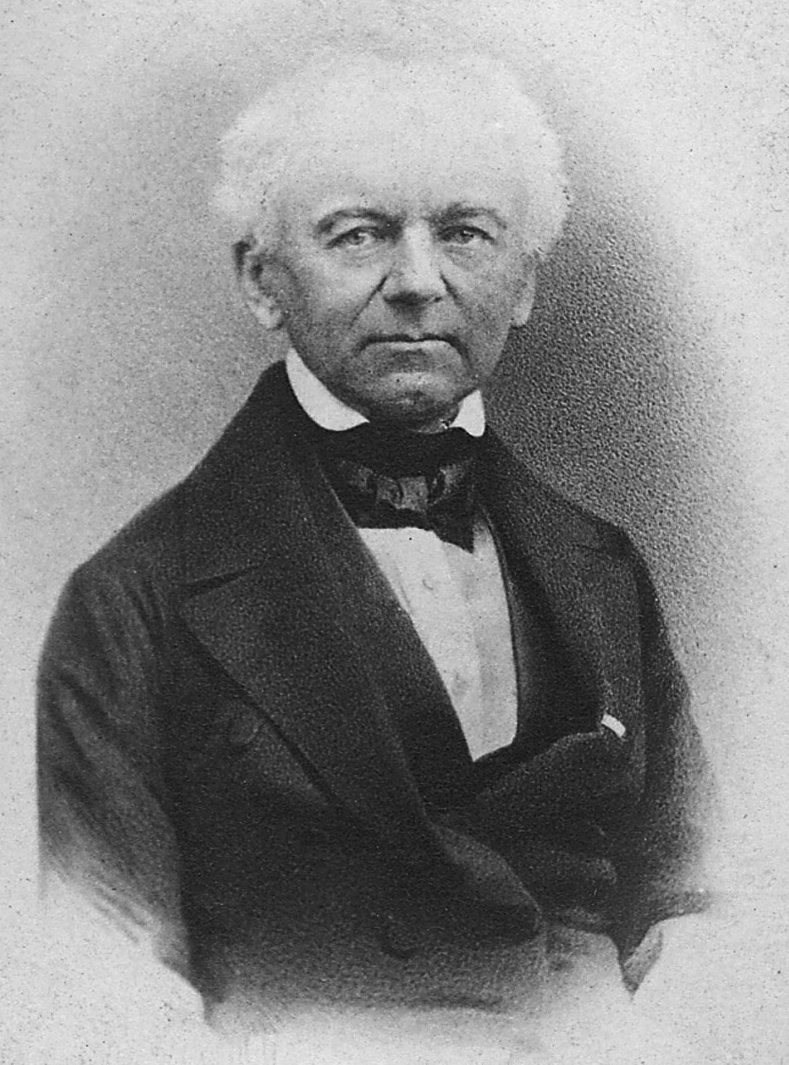
Andreas von Ettingshausen born 25 November

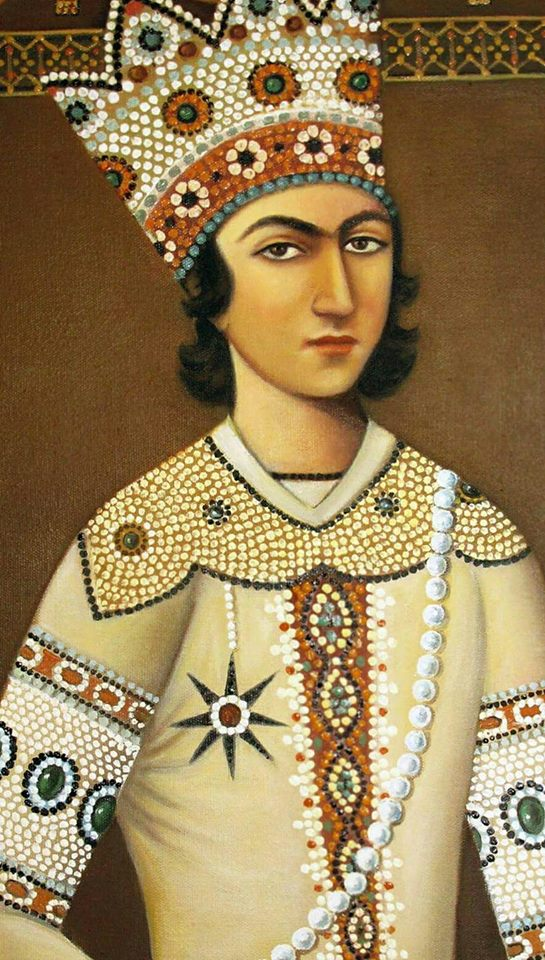
Abdollah Mirza Dara born 25 November

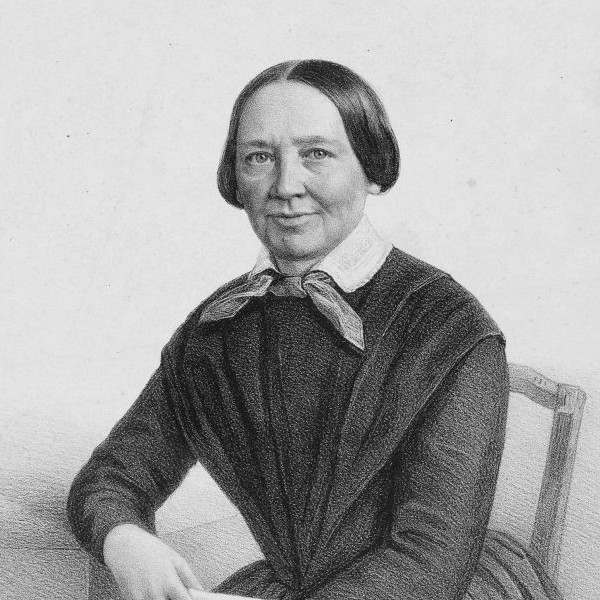
Emilie Zumsteeg born 9 December

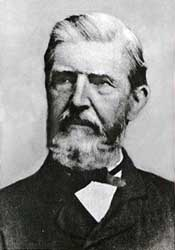
George Storrs born 13 December

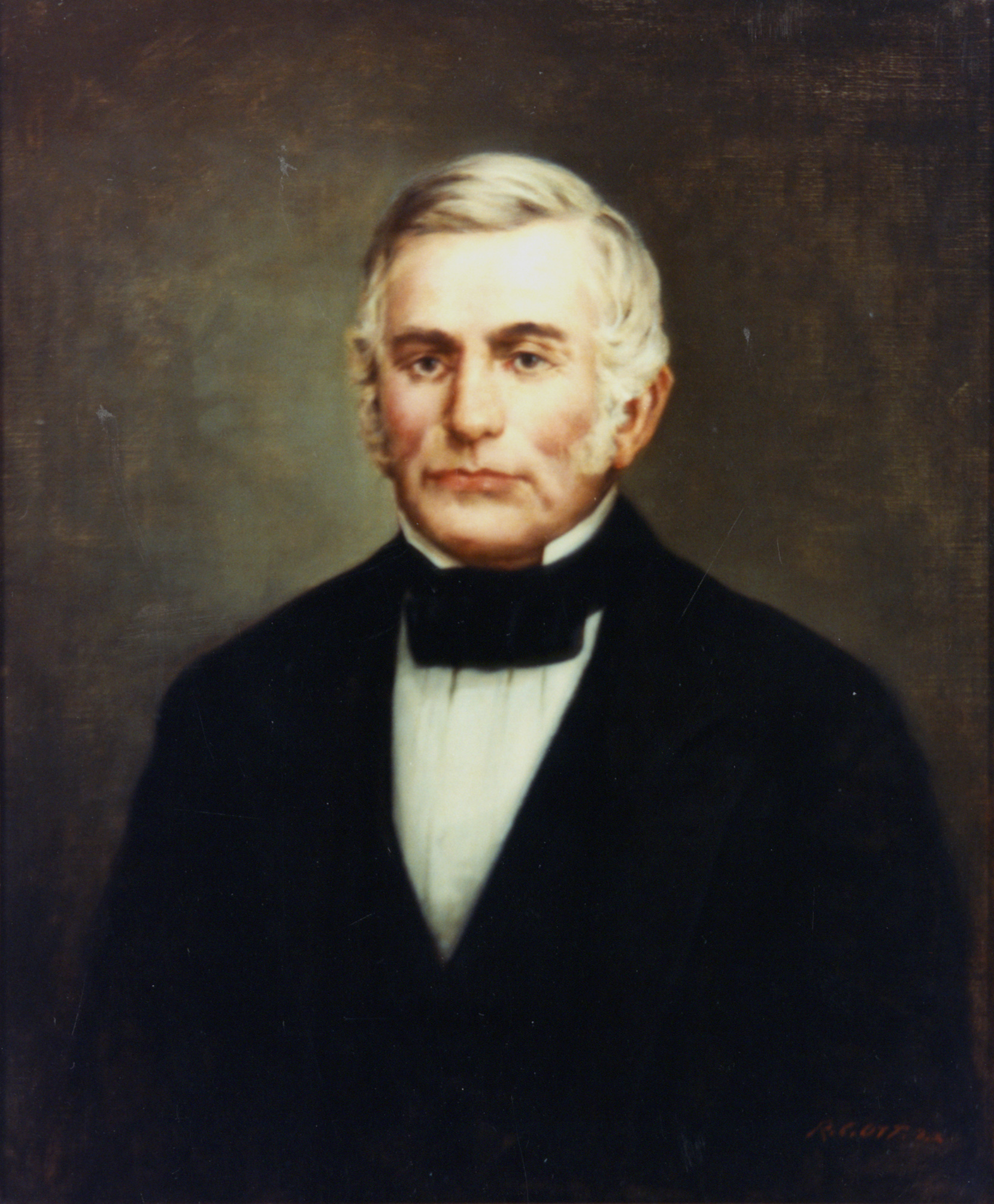
Lilburn Boggs born 14 December

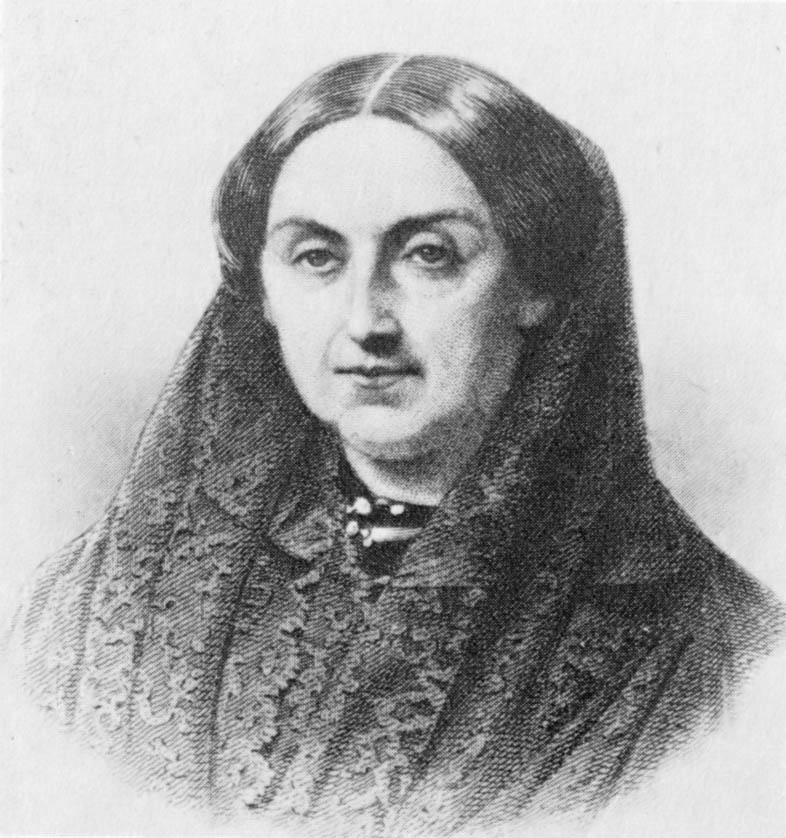
Fernán Caballero born 25 December

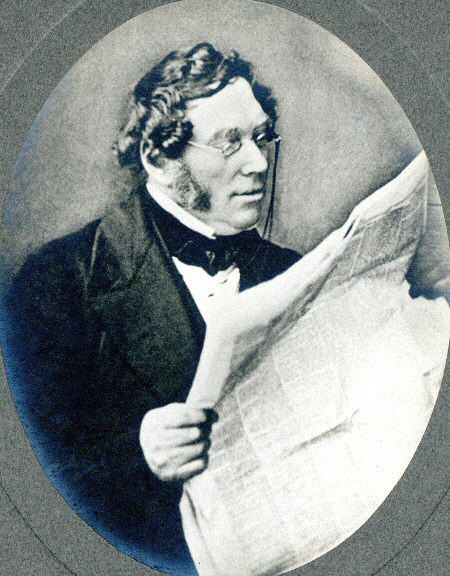
Hugh Lee Pattinson born 25 December

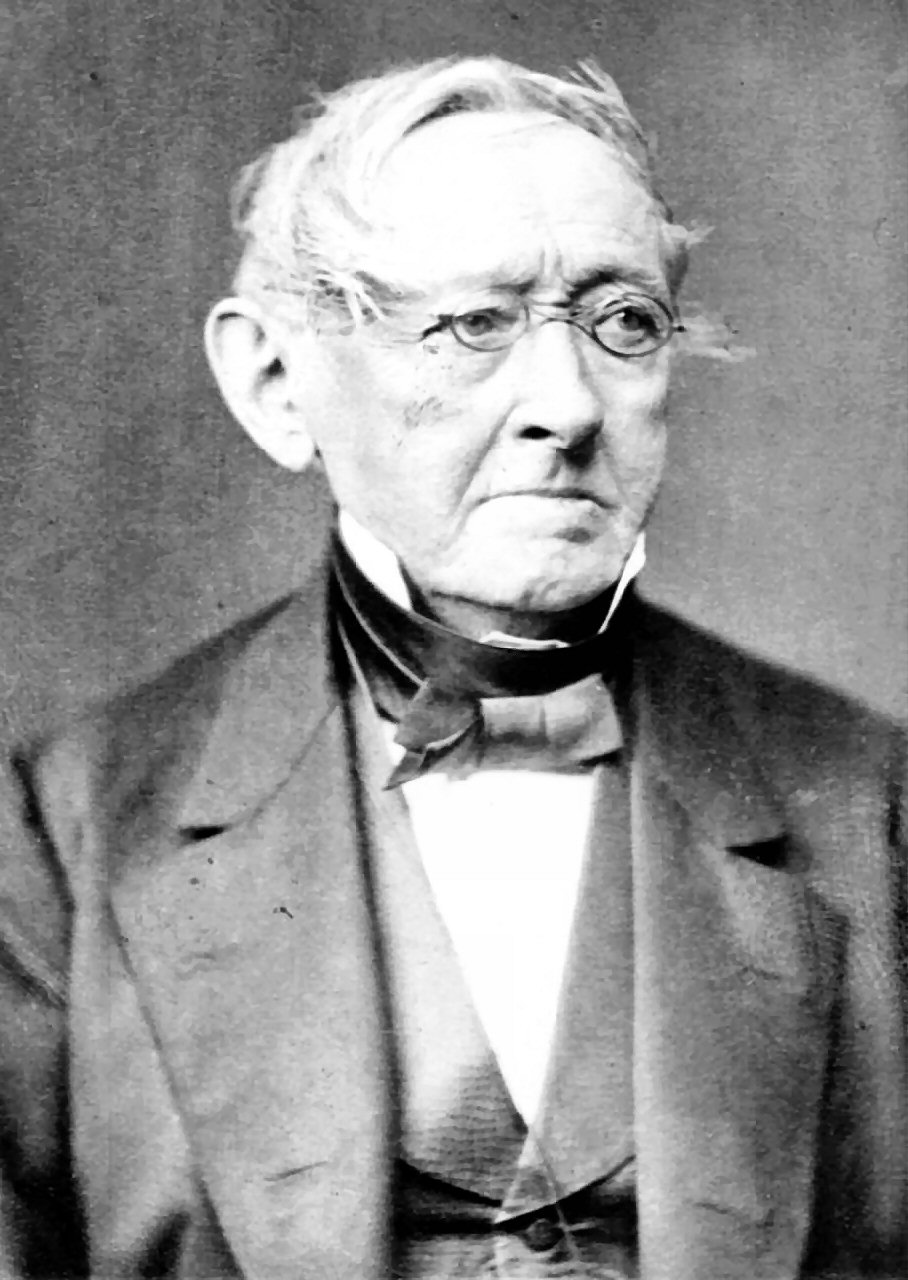
Johann Christian Poggendorff born 29 December

=== January ===
- January 1
  - Emily Baldwin, First Lady of Connecticut (d. 1863)
  - William Gross, criminal (d. 1823)
  - Felix Horetzky, Polish composer and guitarist (d. 1870)
  - Moritz Hermann Eduard Meier, German philologist (d. 1855)
- January 3
  - Milton Alexander, American general (d. 1856)
  - Henry Perceval, 5th Earl of Egmont, peer (d. 1841)
  - Johann Baptist Streicher, Austrian piano maker (d. 1871)
- January 4 – Henry George Bohn, British publisher (d. 1884)
- January 5
  - James Scarth Combe, British surgeon (d. 1883)
  - Jacques-Joseph Haus, lawyer (d. 1881)
  - Joseph Salvador, French scholar (d. 1873)
  - Julia Rush Cutler Ward, American poet (d. 1824)
- January 7
  - Peter Nead, German Baptist Brethren theologian (d. 1877)
  - Princess Charlotte of Wales, daughter and only child of future King George IV (d. 1817)
- January 8
  - Eliza Constantia Campbell, Welsh author (d. 1864)
  - Carl Friedrich Alexander Hartmann, German metallurgist (d. 1863)
- January 9 – Campbell Riddell, Australian public servant (d. 1858)
- January 10 – Leonard Dupont, French naturalist (d. 1828)
- January 12 – Paul Briquet, French physician (d. 1881)
- January 13 – Charles Shore, 2nd Baron Teignmouth, member of the United Kingdom Parliament (d. 1885)
- January 15
  - Pavel Liprandi, Russian military officer (d. 1864)
  - William Wagner, American philanthropist (d. 1885)
- January 16 – Robert Carrington, 2nd Baron Carrington, English army officer and politician (d. 1847)
- January 17
  - John Baker, namesake of the towns of Baker Lake and Baker Brook, New Brunswick, Canada (d. 1868)
  - Thaddeus Fairbanks, American inventor (d. 1886)
  - William Washington Gordon, American politician (d. 1842)
  - Alexander McLeod, Canadian sheriff (d. 1871)
- January 18
  - Charles de Brouckère, Belgian politician (d. 1860)
  - John Storer, merchant and philanthropist from Sanford (d. 1867)
  - John B. Terry, American businessman, soldier, and territorial legislator (d. 1874)
- January 19 – Gaspare Grasselini, Catholic cardinal (d. 1875)
- January 20 – Jacques-Marie-Adrien-Césaire Mathieu, French cardinal and author (d. 1875)
- January 21
  - Francisco Ferreira Drummond, Historian, paleographer, musician, politician (d. 1858)
  - Princess Marie of Hesse-Kassel, German princess and painter (d. 1880)
  - Jean-François Legendre-Héral, French sculptor (d. 1851)
- January 22 – Joseph Parkes, British politician (d. 1865)
- January 23
  - Karl Ernst Claus, Baltic-German chemist, naturalist (d. 1864)
  - George Francis Lyon, English naval officer and explorer (d. 1832)
  - Jean Reboul, French poet (d. 1864)
- January 24 – Nicolas Mori, British musician and publisher (d. 1839)
- January 25
  - William MacGillivray, British naturalist and ornithologist (d. 1852)
  - Samuel Stokely, American politician (d. 1861)
- January 28 – Nathaniel W. Watkins, Confederate Army general (d. 1876)
- January 29
  - Peter Joseph Elvenich, German theologian and philosopher (d. 1886)
  - Théobald de Lacrosse, French soldier and politician (d. 1865)
- January 30
  - James M. Elam, American politician (d. 1856)
  - Albert Gallup, American politician (d. 1851)
  - Jakob Sotriffer, Austrian sculptor (d. 1856)
  - John Ternouth, British artist (d. 1848)
- January 31
  - Anna Elisabeth Hartwick, Swedish lace industrialist (d. 1882)
  - Nathaniel Jocelyn, American artist (d. 1881)
  - Ebenezer Jackson Jr., American politician (d. 1874)
  - Wilhelm Gotthelf Lohrmann, German astronomer (d. 1840)
  - Christian Frederick Martin, American luthier (d. 1873)
  - Alfred Inigo Suckling, British antiquarian (d. 1856)

=== February ===
- February 1 – Abraham Emanuel Fröhlich, Swiss poet (d. 1865)
- February 2
  - François Vincent Latil, French painter (d. 1890)
  - William Richardson, British astronomer (d. 1872)
  - Henry Wyllys Taylor, American judge (d. 1888)
- February 3
  - Peter Ihrie Jr., American politician (d. 1871)
  - Jean-Baptiste Madou, lithographer, painter (d. 1877)
- February 4
  - Erasmus Engert, Austrian painter and restorer (d. 1871)
  - William Nanson Lettsom, British man of letters (d. 1815)
- February 5
  - Pieter Godfried Bertichen, Dutch painter (d. 1856)
  - Nicholas H. Cobbs, American bishop (d. 1861)
  - Johannes von Geissel, Catholic cardinal (d. 1864)
  - Morris Ketchum, American railway entrepreneur (d. 1880)
  - Léon Talabot, French engineer and politician (d. 1863)
- February 6
  - John Stevens Henslow, British botanist, priest and geologist (d. 1861)
  - Alfred Lyall, English philosopher, editor, clergyman and traveller (d. 1865)
- February 7
  - José da Costa Carvalho, Marquis of Monte Alegre, Brazilian politician (d. 1860)
  - Thomas Gregson, 2nd Premier of Tasmania, Australia (d. 1874)
  - Marie-Françoise Perroton, French nun (d. 1873)
- February 8
  - Barthélemy-Prosper Enfantin, one of the founders of Saint-Simonianism (d. 1864)
  - George Washington Toland, American politician (d. 1869)
- February 9
  - Samuel M. Moore, American politician (d. 1875)
  - Thomas Tucker, English first-class cricketer (d. 1832)
- February 10
  - Henry De la Beche, English geologist and palaeontologist (d. 1855)
  - Henry Venn, English mission society administrator (d. 1873)
- February 11
  - John MacDonnell, Irish surgeon and pioneer of surgical anaesthesia in Ireland (d. 1892)
  - John Pontifex, English cricketer (d. 1875)
- February 12
  - Hiram Capron, Founder of the town of Paris, Ontario (d. 1872)
  - Thomas Close, English antiquarian (d. 1881)
  - Damián Domingo, Filipino painter (d. 1834)
  - Henry Dutton, American politician (d. 1869)
  - Benoît-Philibert Perroud, French entomologist (d. 1878)
- February 13
  - Hiram F. Mather, American politician (d. 1868)
  - Adam Norrie, Scottish-American merchant (d. 1882)
  - Henry Sargant Storer, British artist (d. 1837)
- February 14
  - Valentín Carderera, Spanish painter (d. 1880)
  - William Michell, English physician and politician (d. 1872)
  - Poul Pagh, Danish merchant and ship owner (d. 1870)
  - Robert Young, Hawaiian chief (d. 1813)
- February 15
  - Pyotr Anjou, arctic explorer and admiral of Russian Navy (d. 1869)
  - Ali Mirza Zel as-Soltan, pretender to the throne of Qajar Iran (d. 1854)
- February 16
  - Felix Tollemache, British politician (d. 1843)
  - Samuel Charles Whitbread, British politician (d. 1879)
- February 17
  - Louis Eugène Marie Bautain, French philosopher and theologian (d. 1867)
  - Frederick William Beechey, English naval officer and hydrographer (d. 1856)
  - Roswell Bottum, American politician (d. 1877)
  - Robert Milham Hartley, co-founder of the temperance movement in New York (d. 1881)
  - Giovanni Pacini, Italian composer (d. 1867)
  - Philipp Franz von Siebold, German physician, botanist and explorer (d. 1866)
- February 18
  - John Bell, American lawyer and politician (d. 1869)
  - Andreas Christian Møller, Norwegian teacher of the Deaf (d. 1874)
  - Vincenzo Santucci, Italian Catholic cardinal (d. 1861)
  - Abraham P. Stephens, American politician (d. 1859)
- February 20 – Lázár Mészáros, Hungarian military figure (d. 1858)
- February 21
  - Prince George Bernhard of Anhalt-Dessau, German prince (d. 1865)
  - James Sherman, British minister (d. 1862)
- February 22
  - Alexis Bachelot, Roman Catholic priest (d. 1837)
  - Adolphe Quetelet, Belgian mathematician (d. 1874)
  - John N. Steele, American politician (d. 1853)
  - George Sweeny, American politician (d. 1877)
- February 23 – William W. Wick, American politician (d. 1868)
- February 24
  - Gabriel Delafosse, French mineralogist (d. 1878)
  - Carl Axel Gottlund, Linguist, folklorist and historian (d. 1875)
- February 26
  - Prosper Guerrier de Dumast, French historian, writer and archaeologist (d. 1883)
  - Thomas Galloway, Scottish mathematician (d. 1851)
- February 27 – James Planché, British dramatist, costume designer, and antiquarian (d. 1880)
- February 28
  - Edward Banks, Syndicus of the Free City of Hamburg (d. 1851)
  - Heinrich Carl Breidenstein, German musicologist (d. 1876)
- February 29 – Germanicus Mirault, surgeon (d. 1879)

=== March ===
- March 1
  - Louis-Tancrède Bouthillier, Canadian merchant and sheriff (d. 1881)
  - James Heald, English philanthropist and politician (d. 1873)
  - John Jones, Talysarn, Welsh Calvinistic Methodist minister (d. 1857)
- March 2 – Elliott Cresson, American philanthropist (d. 1854)
- March 3
  - Constant Allart, French politician (d. 1861)
  - William Heald Ludlow Bruges, English politician (d. 1848)
  - Theodore Dwight, American author (d. 1866)
- March 4
  - Charles Jacquinot, French Naval officer (d. 1879)
  - John McIntosh, Canadian politician (d. 1853)
- March 6 – Charles C. Stratton, American politician (d. 1859)
- March 7
  - Zadok Casey, American politician (d. 1862)
  - Francis Wayland, American educator; President of Brown University 1827–1855 (d. 1865)
- March 8
  - Orra White Hitchcock, American botanical artist (d. 1863)
  - Nicolaus von Weis, German bishop (d. 1869)
- March 10
  - Julia Catherine Beckwith, Canadian writer (d. 1867)
  - Karl Friedrich Heinrich Marx, German physician (d. 1877)
- March 11 – Johann Ludwig Casper, German forensic pathologist (d. 1864)
- March 12
  - Paul Constant Billot, French botanist (d. 1863)
  - Peter Johnson Gulick, American missionary to the Kingdom of Hawaii and Japan (d. 1877)
  - Jacob A. Preston, American politician (d. 1868)
  - John Prince, Lawyer, gentleman farmer and political figure in Upper Canada and Canada West (d. 1870)
  - Thomas Reynolds, Governor of Missouri (d. 1844)
  - Francis Seger, American politician (d. 1872)
- March 13
  - Francis Adams, Medical doctor, translator (d. 1861)
  - Peter van Bohlen, German orientalist and indologist (d. 1840)
- March 14
  - Anton Haizinger, Austrian singer and opera singer (d. 1869)
  - Henry F. West, Mayor of Indianapolis (d. 1856)
- March 15 – Karl Ullmann, German Calvinist theologian (d. 1865)
- March 16
  - Georgiana Astley, daughter of Sir Henry Dashwood, 3rd Baronet (d. 1835)
  - Cincinnato Baruzzi, Italian artist (d. 1878)
  - Thomas Childs, American military governor (d. 1853)
- March 17
  - Jean-François Bayard, French playwright (d. 1853)
  - Jørgen B Lysholm, Norwegian businessman (d. 1843)
- March 18
  - Christian Joseph Berres, Austrian anatomist and photographer (d. 1844)
  - Jakob Steiner, Swiss mathematician (d. 1863)
- March 19
  - Christopher Andreas Holmboe, Norwegian philologist (d. 1882)
  - José Noriega, Spanish-born Californio politician (d. 1869)
- March 20
  - Raymond Bonheur, French painter (d. 1849)
  - Edward Gibbon Wakefield, New Zealand politician (d. 1862)
- March 21 – Sir George Forster, 2nd Baronet, British politician (d. 1876)
- March 22 – Heinrich Karl Beyrich, German botanist (d. 1834)
- March 23
  - Julius Friedrich Heinrich Abegg, German criminologist (d. 1868)
  - Samuel Congalton, British mariner (d. 1850)
  - Olof Fåhræus, Swedish politician and entomologist (d. 1884)
  - John Jeffries II, American ophthalmic surgeon (d. 1876)
  - Laurent-Joseph-Marius Imbert, French Catholic missionary and saint (d. 1839)
  - Isaac R. Moores, American politician (d. 1861)
  - Peregrin Sandford, American mayor (d. 1884)
- March 24
  - Zulma Carraud, French writer (d. 1889)
  - John Corry Wilson Daly, Canadian politician (d. 1878)
  - Friedrich Adolph Haage, German botanist and gardener (d. 1866)
  - Franz Haller, Hungarian politician (d. 1875)
  - Nunziante Ippolito, Italian physician (d. 1851)
- March 25
  - Richard Biddle, American author and politician (d. 1847)
  - Basil Feilding, 7th Earl of Denbigh, English Earl (d. 1865)
- March 26
  - Armand Louis Joseph de Fitte de Soucy, French divisional general and governor of Martinique (d. 1862)
  - Bellamy Storer, Cincinnati politician (d. 1875)
- March 27
  - Jean-Claude Bonnefond, painter (d. 1860)
  - Robert James Graves, Irish surgeon (d. 1853)
  - Gregorio José Ramírez, Costa Rican politician and sailor (d. 1823)
- March 28
  - Jean Benner-Fries, French painter (d. 1849)
  - William B. Ide, Californian politician (d. 1852)
  - Elijah Iles, American politician (d. 1883)
- March 30 – Edward Seymour, English cricketer (d. 1866)
- March 31
  - Theodor Brüggemann, German politician, jurist and educationist (d. 1866)
  - Philippe Buchez, French historian, sociologist, and politician (d. 1865)
  - Hermann Hupfeld, German theologian (d. 1866)
  - Zephaniah Platt, American lawyer and judge (d. 1871)

=== April ===
- April 2
  - Ana María Campos, Venezuelan resistance fighter (d. 1828)
  - Sébastien René Lenormand, French phycologist (d. 1871)
  - William Pickering, English publisher (d. 1854)
- April 3
  - William Nairn Forbes, British Army officer and civil engineer (d. 1855)
  - Edward Livingston, American politician (d. 1840)
  - Herbert Mayo, British physiologist, anatomist and medical writer (d. 1852)
  - Jean Ulveling, Luxembourgian politician (d. 1878)
- April 6
  - Isaac E. Holmes, American politician (d. 1867)
  - Alexander Nisbet, British surgeon (d. 1874)
- April 8
  - James Boggs, Virginia militia Confederate States Army Brigadier General (d. 1862)
  - Alfred Bunn, British businessman, librettist (d. 1860)
  - Hygin-Auguste Cavé, attorney, journalist, government official, amateur playwright (d. 1852)
  - Frederik von Scholten, Danish naval officer, customs inspector and amateur artist (d. 1853)
- April 9
  - Date Chikamune, daimyo (d. 1812)
  - Elisha Huntington, American physician and politician (d. 1865)
  - Thomas Thynne, Viscount Weymouth, British Member of Parliament (d. 1837)
- April 10
  - James Bowie, American pioneer, soldier, smuggler, slave trader, and land speculator (d. 1836)
  - Thomas Burns, New Zealand minister (d. 1871)
  - Thomas Fitzgerald, American politician (d. 1855)
- April 12
  - George N. Briggs, Massachusetts Governor and Congressman (d. 1861)
  - William J. McCluney, United States Navy officer (d. 1864)
  - Baron du Potet, French mesmerist (d. 1881)
- April 13
  - Rosa Campuzano, activist in the struggle for the independence of Peru (d. 1851)
  - Andreas Gottlieb Hoffmann, German academic (d. 1864)
- April 14
  - Benjamin Bonneville, Union Army General (d. 1878)
  - Ramond de la Croisette, French playwright (d. 1849)
  - Frederik Due, Norwegian Prime minister (d. 1873)
  - Robert Lynam, English cleric, schoolteacher, writer and editor (d. 1845)
- April 15
  - John Sill Rogers, politician (d. 1860)
  - Marie-Alfred de Suin, French admiral (d. 1861)
- April 17
  - Richard Fish Cadle, American Episcopalian priest (d. 1857)
  - Dominique-Augustin Dufêtre, French bishop (d. 1860)
  - Stanisław Jachowicz, Polish poet (d. 1857)
- April 18 – Gloud Wilson McLelan, Canadian politician (d. 1858)
- April 19
  - Bernhard von Beskow, Swedish dramatist and historian (d. 1868)
  - Johann Baptist Friedreich, German forensic pathologist and psychiatrist (d. 1862)
  - Franz Anton von Gerstner, Czech surveyor (d. 1840)
- April 20
  - Francis Baring, 1st Baron Northbrook, British politician (d. 1866)
  - Charles Marc-René de Voyer de Paulmy d'Argenson, French archaeologist (d. 1862)
  - George Gleig, Scottish soldier, military writer, and priest (d. 1888)
- April 21
  - Thomas Earle, American journalist (d. 1849)
  - Frederik Faber, Danish zoologist (d. 1828)
  - Richard Ford, English writer (d. 1858)
  - Frederick A. Kaye, American politician (d. 1866)
  - Horatio Needham, American politician (d. 1863)
- April 23 – William Baird, Scottish politician (d. 1864)
- April 24
  - Karl Immermann, German writer (d. 1840)
  - Giorgio Pallavicino Trivulzio, Italian politician (d. 1878)
- April 25
  - Peter Greenall, brewer (d. 1845)
  - Giuseppe Giacinto Moris, Italian botanist (d. 1869)
- April 26 – Edouard Mary, Belgian politician and lawyer (d. 1853)
- April 27
  - Johann F. C. Hessel, German scientist (d. 1872)
  - Princess Maria Ferdinanda of Saxony, German princess (d. 1865)
- April 29
  - Solomon Yeomans Chesley, Canadian politician (d. 1880)
  - Walter Henry Medhurst, missionary in China (d. 1857)
- April 30 – Adolphe Crémieux, French-Jewish politician, abolitionist (d. 1880)

=== May ===
- May 1
  - Junius Brutus Booth, English stage actor, father of Edwin Booth and John Wilkes Booth (d. 1852)
  - Elial T. Foote, American physician, politician, jurist and historian (d. 1877)
  - Alexandru II Ghica, Ruler of Wallachia (d. 1862)
  - George Hussey Packe, MP, army officer, chairman of the Great Northern Railway (d. 1874)
  - Arabella Sullivan, British author (d. 1839)
  - Charles Cushing Wright, American engraver and medalist (d. 1857)
- May 2
  - Giuseppe Balducci, Italian composer (d. 1845)
  - Colm de Bhailís, Irish poet and songwriter (d. 1906)
  - Joseph Brown, English Roman Catholic bishop (d. 1880)
  - Mace Moulton, American politician (d. 1867)
  - John G. Palfrey, American clergyman, historian and politician (d. 1881)
- May 3 – Lewis Miller, American artist (d. 1882)
- May 4
  - Horace Mann, American educator, abolitionist (d. 1859)
  - William Pennington, American politician (d. 1862)
  - William H. Prescott, American historian and Hispanist (d. 1859)
  - Joseph Pannell Taylor, Union United States Army general (d. 1864)
- May 5
  - William Cormack, Scottish-Canadian explorer (d. 1868)
  - Robert Foulis, Canadian engineer (d. 1866)
  - Charles W. Sandford, American militia and artillery officer, lawyer and businessman (d. 1878)
- May 6
  - Karl Heinrich Frotscher, German classical philologist (d. 1876)
  - Johann Adam Möhler, German theologian (d. 1838)
- May 7
  - Frances Catherine Barnard, English writer, poet, playwright (d. 1869)
  - Karl Heinrich Mertens, German botanist and naturalist (d. 1830)
  - George Upfold, American Episcopal bishop (d. 1872)
- May 8
  - Robert Fane, British judge (d. 1864)
  - John Pitt Kennedy, British army officer (d. 1879)
  - Jean-Baptiste Meilleur, Canadian doctor, educator and political figure (d. 1878)
  - François Mignet, French historian and journalist (d. 1884)
- May 9
  - George W. Bradford, American politician, New York (d. 1883)
  - Joseph Meyer, German publisher (d. 1856)
  - August Pauly, German classical scholar (d. 1845)
  - Lyman Wight, Apostle in the Latter Day Saint movement (d. 1858)
- May 10 – Ludwig Greiner, Austrian businessman (d. 1882)
- May 12
  - Frédéric-Auguste Demetz, French penal reformer (d. 1873)
  - Johann Baptist Isenring, photographer (d. 1860)
  - Hancock Lee Jackson, American politician (d. 1876)
  - James Ranald Martin, Scottish surgeon in India (d. 1874)
  - Franz Mone, German historian (d. 1871)
- May 14 – Samuel Jaudon, American railroad executive (d. 1874)
- May 15
  - John Bingle, sailor, merchant and landholder (d. 1882)
  - Esprit Blanche, French psychiatrist (d. 1852)
  - Charlotte Caroline Richardson, British poet and writer (d. 1854)
  - Johann Heinrich Richartz, German merchant (d. 1861)
- May 16 – Ambrose Poynter, British architect (d. 1886)
- May 17
  - William Hooker, English cricketer (d. 1867)
  - Franz von Schober, Austrian poet and librettist (d. 1882)
- May 20
  - Clément Bonnand, Roman Catholic bishop (d. 1861)
  - Abel Ingpen, British entomologist (d. 1854)
- May 21
  - Reverdy Johnson, American politician (d. 1876)
  - Benjamin Ogle Tayloe, American diplomat (d. 1868)
- May 23
  - Hiram P. Hunt, American politician (d. 1865)
  - Vince Stingl, Hungarian-German porcelain manufacturer (d. 1850)
  - Zadock Thompson, American naturalist (d. 1857)
- May 24
  - George Wilmot Bonner, British wood-engraver (d. 1836)
  - Étienne-Jules Ramey, sculptor from France (d. 1852)
- May 25
  - Hippolyte Auger, French writer (d. 1881)
  - Mendes Cohen, was a Jewish American politician, traveler and businessman (d. 1879)
  - James Langston, British landowner and politician; (d. 1863)
- May 26
  - Armand Joseph Bruat, French admiral (d. 1855)
  - Aloys II, Prince of Liechtenstein (d. 1858)
- May 27
  - Henry Bidleman Bascom, American bishop (d. 1850)
  - William Ramsay, Scottish Royal Navy rear-admiral (d. 1871)
- May 28
  - Fernando Baquedano, Chilean politician and general (d. 1862)
  - Joseph-Henri Léveillé, French botanist (d. 1870)
  - William Miller, Scottish engraver and watercolorist (d. 1882)
- May 29 – Jacob G. Davies, American politician (d. 1857)
- May 30
  - Frederick Charles Husenbeth, English Catholic priest and writer (d. 1872)
  - Olivier Voutier, French naval officer (d. 1877)

=== June ===
- June 1
  - Thomas Brown Anderson, Canadian merchant, philanthropist, President of the Bank of Montreal (d. 1873)
  - Josiah Brewer, American minister and author (d. 1872)
  - Nicolas Léonard Sadi Carnot, French military engineer and physicist, "father of thermodynamics" (d. 1832)
  - John Rae, Canadian economist (d. 1872)
- June 2 – Jean-Baptiste-Pierre Lafitte, French librettist (d. 1879)
- June 3 – Dyer Ball, American missionary (d. 1866)
- June 5 – Alexander W. Brewster, American merchant (d. 1851)
- June 6
  - Francis M. Dimond, American politician (d. 1859)
  - Julius Timoleon Ducatel, geologist (d. 1849)
- June 9 – Avery Skinner, American politician in New York (d. 1876)
- June 10
  - Charles Augustus FitzRoy, British military officer (d. 1858)
  - Eugénie Foa, French writer (d. 1852)
  - Antun Mihanović, Croatian poet (d. 1861)
- June 11 – François-Louis Cailler, Swiss chocolatier (d. 1852)
- June 12
  - George Bush, American biblical scholar and pastor (d. 1859)
  - Louis Alix de Nompère de Champagny, French diplomat and politician (d. 1870)
  - Ang Duong, Cambodian politician (d. 1860)
  - Mary Grimstone, British writer and social reformer (d. 1869)
  - Joab Lawler, American politician (d. 1838)
- June 13 – Charles Eloi Demarquet, French military officer (d. 1870)
- June 14
  - Nikolai Brashman, Russian mathematician of Czech origin (d. 1866)
  - Lyman Coleman, American scholar and author (d. 1882)
  - Mathilda d'Orozco, Swedish noble (d. 1863)
  - John M. Jones, American politician from Pennsylvania (d. 1872)
  - Carlotta Marchionni, Italian actress (d. 1861)
- June 15 – Joseph-Pierre Braemt, Belgian engraver and medalist (d. 1864)
- June 16 – François Baucher, French squire (d. 1873)
- June 18
  - Friedrich Diercks, first German emigrant in Texas (d. 1848)
  - Humphrey H. Leavitt, United States federal judge (d. 1873)
  - Patrick Shaw, Scottish lawyer and legal writer (d. 1872)
- June 19
  - John Bell, American politician (d. 1869)
  - Gervais Nolan, Canadian fur trader (d. 1857)
- June 20
  - Charles Brickett Haddock, American politician (d. 1861)
  - Luigi Amat di San Filippo e Sorso, Catholic cardinal (d. 1878)
- June 21
  - William Gunning, Archdeacon of Bath (d. 1860)
  - Henry Thomas Windsor, American postal pioneer (d. 1848)
- June 22 – Nikolai Polevoy, Russian historian and writer (d. 1846)
- June 23
  - Ferdinando Giorgetti, Italian composer, violinist, publicist, musical teacher and conductor (d. 1867)
  - Henry Oakes, English cricketer (d. 1875)
  - Philo White, American newspaperman, politician and diplomat (d. 1883)
- June 24
  - Rafael Barišić, Roman Catholic bishop (d. 1863)
  - Charles Cousin-Montauban, Comte de Palikao, French general and statesman (d. 1878)
  - Jan Czeczot, Polish and Belarusian romantic poet and ethnographer (d. 1847)
  - Wilhelm Hemprich, German naturalist and explorer (d. 1825)
  - Ernst Mayer, German sculptor (d. 1844)
- June 25 – Emperor Nicholas I of Russia, Emperor of Russia (d. 1855)
- June 26
  - Jan Paweł Lelewel, painter (d. 1847)
  - Jerauld Newland Ezra Mann, sheriff of Norfolk County, Massachusetts (d. 1857)
  - Robert Parker, Canadian lawyer, judge and political figure in New Brunswick (d. 1865)
  - Joseph-Vincent Quiblier, Canadian priest (d. 1852)
- June 27
  - François-Xavier Joseph de Casabianca, French politician (d. 1881)
  - John Rivett-Carnac, British sea explorer (d. 1869)
- June 28
  - Caroline Amalie of Augustenburg, Queen consort of Denmark (d. 1881)
  - Paul Camille von Denis, German businessman (d. 1872)
- June 29
  - Pavel Petrovich Anosov, Russian mining engineer (d. 1851)
  - John Williams, English missionary (d. 1839)
- June 30
  - Antonin Moine, French sculptor (d. 1849)
  - William Davis Snodgrass, Presbyterian clergyman, New York City (d. 1886)
  - Francis Frankland Whinyates, British army officer in the East India company (d. 1887)

=== July ===
- July 1
  - Charles Tennant, English politician (d. 1873)
  - William Henry Watson, British politician and judge (d. 1860)
  - Frederick Wells, British cricketer (d. 1849)
  - James Williams, American diplomat (d. 1869)
- July 2
  - François Fulgis Chevallier, French botanist (d. 1840)
  - Michael Thonet, German-Austrian cabinet maker (d. 1871)
- July 3 – Heinrich Moritz Chalybäus, German philosopher (d. 1862)
- July 4 – John Motley Morehead, American politician (d. 1866)
- July 5 – Isaac Hays, American journalist (d. 1879)
- July 6
  - Théodore Simon Jouffroy, French philosopher (d. 1842)
  - Maria Martin, American artist and scientific illustrator (d. 1863)
  - Robert Wight, Scottish surgeon, botanist and botanical collector (d. 1872)
- July 10
  - Carl Henrik Boheman, Swedish entomologist (d. 1868)
  - Domenico Foroni, Italian composer and conductor (d. 1853)
  - María Josefa García Granados, Guatemalan writer (d. 1848)
  - John Johns, American bishop (d. 1876)
  - W. Lafontaine, French playwright (d. 1861)
  - Charles Molyneux, 3rd Earl of Sefton, British politician (d. 1855)
- July 11 – Carl Fredrik Liljevalch Sr., Swedish businessman, entrepreneur and diplomat (d. 1870)
- July 12
  - Albert Knoll, Austrian theologian (d. 1863)
  - Johann Joseph Schmeller, German painter (d. 1841)
- July 13
  - William Harvey, English engraver and designer (d. 1866)
  - Gustav Seyffarth, German-American Egyptologist (d. 1885)
- July 14
  - James Mellor Brown, English cleric (d. 1867)
  - William A. Whittlesey, American politician, Ohio (d. 1866)
- July 15
  - Thomas Bulfinch, American writer and mythologist (d. 1867)
  - Karl Friedrich Vollrath Hoffmann, German author (d. 1842)
  - Thomas Shanks, American politician (d. 1849)
  - Joseph Smith, President of Franklin College (d. 1868)
  - Joseph Augustine Wade, Irish composer (d. 1845)
- July 16
  - Jean-Baptiste-Camille Corot, French landscape and portrait painter and printmaker in etching (d. 1875)
  - Henry Grider, American politician (d. 1866)
- July 18
  - Immanuel Hermann Fichte, German philosopher (d. 1879)
  - William Lunn, Canadian educator, businessman, and politician (d. 1886)
- July 19 – Armand Malitourne, French literary critic (d. 1866)
- July 20
  - Maziere Brady, Irish judge (d. 1871)
  - Edward Hodges, Anglo-American composer and organist (d. 1867)
- July 22 – Carlo Pepoli, Italian politician, journalist, and poet (d. 1881)
- July 23 – Franz Berwald, Swedish composer (d. 1868)
- July 24
  - John M. Clayton, American lawyer and politician (d. 1856)
  - Georg, Duke of Saxe-Altenburg (d. 1853)
  - Karol Ignacy Lorinser, Austrian Physician (d. 1853)
- July 25 – Gideon Lane Soule, American educator, principal of Phillips Exeter Academy (d. 1879)
- July 26
  - George Catlin, American painter (d. 1872)
  - Lizinska de Mirbel, French miniaturist (d. 1849)
- July 27
  - Eliza Henderson Boardman Otis, American philanthropist, novelist, and social leader (d. 1873)
  - Jacques Reclus, French protestant church clergyman (d. 1882)
  - Pavel Stroyev, Russian historian (d. 1876)
- July 28
  - John Dudlow, English cricketer (d. 1879)
  - Charles Edward Long, British antiquarian (d. 1861)
  - Pakubuwono VII, Susuhunan of Surakarta (d. 1858)
- July 29
  - Walter Hunt, American mechanic and inventor (d. 1859)
  - Joannes Josephus van Mulken, Dutch politician (d. 1879)
  - Christian Winther, Danish lyric poet (d. 1876)
- July 30 – Jules Vinçard, French humorist (d. 1879)
- July 31
  - Jean-Gaspard Deburau, Bohemian-French mime (d. 1846)
  - Mary Euphrasia Pelletier, French Roman Catholic nun and saint (d. 1868)
  - Meade Purdy, American politician (d. 1870)

=== August ===
- August 1
  - George Pritchard, British Christian missionary and diplomat (d. 1883)
  - François Désiré Roulin, French explorer and scientist (d. 1874)
- August 3
  - Ferdinand Helias, American priest (d. 1874)
  - Anna Lühring, Prussian soldier (d. 1866)
- August 4 – Samuel Cahen, French Hebraist and journalist (d. 1862)
- August 5
  - Michael Banim, Irish writer (d. 1874)
  - Francisco Gómez, President of El Salvador (d. 1838)
- August 6 – Ludwig von Zanth, German architect and painter (d. 1857)
- August 7
  - John Boyd, American settler in Texas and state senator (d. 1873)
  - François Zola, French engineer (d. 1847)
- August 9 – Ezra Durgin, politician (d. 1863)
- August 13
  - Pierre Beaubien, Canadian politician (d. 1881)
  - Carl August Buchholz, organ builder (d. 1884)
  - Robert Halley, British minister (d. 1876)
- August 14
  - James Gerry, American politician (d. 1873)
  - Juan Temple, American landowner (d. 1866)
- August 15
  - Samuel C. Sample, American politician (d. 1855)
  - John Torrey, United States botanist (d. 1873)
- August 16
  - Nathaniel Boyden, American politician (d. 1873)
  - Frédéric de Courcy, French man of letters (d. 1862)
  - Francis Crozier, Irish naval officer and polar explorer (d. 1848)
- August 17 – Rufus Anderson, American minister (d. 1880)
- August 19 – Agnes Strickland, English writer and editor (d. 1874)
- August 21
  - Hugh Archer, American politician (d. 1858)
  - William Cavendish-Scott-Bentinck, Marquess of Titchfield, British politician (d. 1824)
  - Asher Brown Durand, American painter and engraver (d. 1886)
  - Hermann Olshausen, German theologian (d. 1839)
- August 22
  - David Canabarro, Brazilian Gaúcho revolutionary (d. 1867)
  - Baden Powell, mathematician (d. 1860)
  - Dhian Singh, longest serving wazir of the Sikh Empire (d. 1843)
- August 24 – George Huntington, American farmer and politician from New York (d. 1866)
- August 25
  - Edwin Beard Budding, inventor of the lawnmower and adjustable spanner (d. 1846)
  - James Lick, American businessman, piano builder (d. 1876)
  - Friedrich Ludwig Meissner, German obstetrician (d. 1860)
- August 26
  - Nicol Hugh Baird, British surveyor (d. 1849)
  - William Marshall, English politician (d. 1872)
  - Peter von Meyendorff, Russian diplomat (d. 1863)
- August 27
  - Joanna Quiner, American seamstress and sculptor (d. 1868)
  - Sophia Smith, founder of Smith College (d. 1870)
- August 28
  - William Hiley Bathurst, British hymnwriter (d. 1877)
  - Irénée-Jules Bienaymé, French mathematician (d. 1878)
  - Andreas Hallager, Danish composer (d. 1853)
- August 29 – Gaspard Théodore Mollien, French diplomat and explorer (d. 1872)
- August 30
  - Julien-Léopold Boilly, painter (d. 1874)
  - Émile Debraux, French chansonnier and poet (d. 1831)

=== September ===
- September 1
  - James Apjohn, professor of chemistry and mineralogy, Trinity College, Dublin (d. 1886)
  - Nathaniel S. Berry, American politician (d. 1894)
- September 2
  - Ferdinand-Alphonse Hamelin, French admiral (d. 1864)
  - Jean-Baptiste Minne-Barth, Belgian politician and lawyer (d. 1851)
- September 3 – Alphonse de Gisors, French architect (d. 1866)
- September 4
  - Robert Lambert Baynes, British Royal Navy admiral (d. 1869)
  - Karl Eberhard Herwarth von Bittenfeld, Prussian field marshal (d. 1884)
  - James Estabrook, American politician and sheriff (d. 1874)
  - Peter Fendi, Austrian artist (d. 1842)
  - Henry Yeomans Mott, Canadian politician (d. 1866)
- September 5
  - Jacobus Cornelis Gaal, Dutch painter and etcher (d. 1866)
  - Sarah Preston Hale, American newspaper publisher (d. 1866)
  - Pierre-Théodore Verhaegen, Belgian politician, founder of the Université libre de Bruxelles (d. 1862)
- September 6 – Charles Follen, German poet and patriot (d. 1840)
- September 7 – Abraham Edwards, American politician (d. 1870)
- September 8
  - Henry Bentinck, British courtier (d. 1878)
  - Francesco Boffo, Sardinian-born Neoclassical architect (d. 1867)
  - Jean-Jacques Champin, watercolorist and lithographer (d. 1860)
  - William Montague Ferry, American missionary (d. 1867)
  - Antonio Gutiérrez de la Fuente, president of Peru (d. 1878)
- September 9
  - Harriet Vaughan Cheney, American-Canadian novelist, writer (d. 1889)
  - Johan Nordenfalk, Swedish politician (d. 1846)
- September 10 – Eugénie Niboyet, French author, feminist (d. 1883)
- September 11
  - Alexandre Basset, French writer and playwright (d. 1870)
  - Édouard-Joseph-Ennemond Mazères, French writer and librettist (d. 1866)
- September 12
  - Uriel Crocker, American businessman (d. 1887)
  - Vasyl Popovych, Ruthenian Greek Catholic hierarch (d. 1864)
- September 13
  - John Hales Calcraft, British Member of Parliament (d. 1880)
  - James Finlay Weir Johnston, Scottish agricultural chemist (d. 1855)
  - Charles Handy Russell, American merchant and banker (d. 1884)
- September 14
  - Charles Waln Morgan, Quaker whaling executive, New Bedford, Massachusetts (d. 1861)
  - Woodbine Parish, British scientist and diplomat (d. 1882)
- September 16
  - Jean-Baptiste Bouillaud, French physician (d. 1881)
  - Johann Daniel Elster, composer and choir director (d. 1857)
  - William Augustus Muhlenberg, United States Anglican Episcopal clergyman (d. 1877)
- September 19
  - Hartley Coleridge, British poet, biographer, essayist, and teacher (d. 1849)
  - Richard Harlan, American zoologist (d. 1843)
- September 20
  - Franz Wilhelm Ferling, German oboist, composer, and clarinettist (d. 1874)
  - Robert Strange, Former US Senator from North Carolina, unsuccessful Vice Presidential nominee (d. 1854)
- September 21 – John Samuel Enys, British engineer (d. 1872)
- September 22
  - Countess Louise Sophie Danneskiold-Samsøe, member of a Danish noble family (d. 1867)
  - Albert Woldemar Hollander, German educationist (d. 1868)
  - Cornelius Stribling, United States Navy Rear Admiral (d. 1880)
- September 24 – Joseph Beaume, French painter (d. 1885)
- September 25
  - Antoine-Louis Barye, French sculptor (d. 1875)
  - Donald Cameron, 23rd Lochiel (d. 1858)
  - Samuel Jones-Loyd, 1st Baron Overstone, British politician; (d. 1883)
- September 26
  - Richard H. Bayard, American judge (d. 1868)
  - Louis Félix Étienne, marquis de Turgot, French politician (d. 1866)
  - Princess Ida of Waldeck and Pyrmont, German princess (d. 1869)
  - Daniel Turner, American politician (d. 1860)
- September 27
  - António Manuel da Fonseca, Portuguese painter (d. 1890)
  - Thomas Fortier, Canadian politician (d. 1876)
- September 28
  - Robert Budd Gilchrist, United States federal judge (d. 1856)
  - Karl Wilhelm Krüger, German classical philologist (d. 1874)
- September 29
  - Bólu-Hjálmar, Icelandic poet (d. 1875)
  - Jonathan Smith Green, American missionary to Hawaii, educator (d. 1878)
  - Samuel Irton, politician (d. 1866)
- September 30
  - John Kimball, American politician from New Hampshire and Vermont (d. 1884)
  - John Mytton, British politician (d. 1834)
  - Reuben M. Norton, American businessman, 1st Mayor of Racine, Wisconsin (d. 1884)
  - Princess Frederica of Prussia, Duchess of Anhalt-Dessau (d. 1850)

=== October ===
- October 1
  - Charles James Barnett, British politician (d. 1882)
  - Louise Swanton Belloc, French writer and translator (d. 1881)
  - Cornelia Frances Jefferson, American singer and actress (d. 1848)
  - Mikhail Muravyov-Vilensky, Russian imperial statesmen (d. 1866)
- October 2
  - Sir Henry Chamberlain, 2nd Baronet, Brazilian painter (d. 1844)
  - Sir Edward Denny, 4th Baronet, British politician (d. 1889)
  - William Boyd Kinnear, Canadian politician (d. 1868)
- October 3 – William Jameson, Scottish-Ecuadorian botanist (d. 1873)
- October 4
  - August Wilhelm Bach, German composer (d. 1869)
  - Thomas Baillie, Canadian politician (d. 1863)
  - Robert King, 4th Earl of Kingston, Irish Earl (d. 1867)
  - John Richardson, British Army officer and Canadian novelist (d. 1852)
- October 5
  - John Hoge Ewing, American politician (d. 1887)
  - Yisrael Friedman of Ruzhin, Hasidic rabbi and rebe, founder of the Ruzhyn dynasty (d. 1850)
- October 6
  - August Abendroth, Lawyer, businessman and philanthropist (d. 1867)
  - Thomas T. Fauntleroy, American military figure and politician (d. 1883)
  - Charles Backus Goddard, American lawyer and politician (d. 1864)
  - Yevgeny Obolensky, Russian military officer (d. 1865)
  - George R. Redfield, American politician from Michigan (d. 1887)
  - Leonora Cannon Taylor, member of the Relief Society (d. 1868)
- October 8 – Joseph S. Cabot, Massachusetts banker and politician (d. 1874)
- October 9
  - Fitzroy Kelly, British politician (d. 1880)
  - John Murdoch, Roman Catholic bishop in Scotland (d. 1865)
  - Rémi-Joseph Tellier, French Jesuit priest (d. 1866)
  - Joseph Bonomi the Younger, English archaeologist and writer (d. 1878)
- October 10
  - Franz Gerhard Eschweiler, German botanist (d. 1831)
  - Thomas Konow, Norwegian politician and admiral (d. 1881)
- October 11
  - August Ahlborn, German painter (d. 1857)
  - John W. Brown, American politician from New York (d. 1875)
  - Charles-Prosper Ollivier d'Angers, French neurologist (d. 1845)
- October 12
  - William Arrindell, British judge (d. 1862)
  - Jacob Eichenbaum, Galician-Jewish maskil, educator, poet and mathematician (d. 1861)
- October 13
  - Ellen Randolph Coolidge, granddaughter of Thomas Jefferson (d. 1876)
  - Stephen Creyke, English Anglican priest (d. 1883)
  - Coralie van den Cruyce, Belgian writer, feminist, poet (d. 1858)
  - Anders Retzius, Swedish scientist (d. 1860)
- October 14
  - John Easton Mills, former mayor of Montreal, Quebec (d. 1847)
  - Ludvig Nicolaus von Scheele, Danish statesman (d. 1874)
- October 15
  - John Stephen Bazin, French-born bishop in Indiana, United States (d. 1848)
  - Date Narimune, daimyo (d. 1819)
  - Toma Polyanskyi, politician (d. 1869)
- October 16
  - Jean-Joseph Ader, French playwright (d. 1859)
  - Samuel G. Andrews, American politician (d. 1863)
  - James Martin Bell, American politician (d. 1849)
  - Karl Spindler, German writer (d. 1855)
- October 17
  - Richard DeCharms, American minister (d. 1864)
  - William Deedes, English cricketer and politician (d. 1862)
  - Leopold Kupelwieser, Austrian artist (d. 1862)
  - James Matheson, British politician and merchant (d. 1878)
  - Ross Winans, inventor, locomotive builder (d. 1877)
- October 18
  - Francis Bisset Hawkins, English physician (d. 1894)
  - Hosea Ballou II, American Universalist minister (d. 1861)
  - John Wilford Blackstone Sr., American lawyer and politician (d. 1868)
- October 19
  - Remexido, Portuguese guerrilla leader (d. 1838)
  - Carl Wagner, German painter known for romantic landscape painting (d. 1867)
- October 20
  - Walter Bearblock, English cricketer (d. 1857)
  - Pierre Lorillard III, American businessman (d. 1867)
  - George W. Owen, American politician (d. 1837)
  - George Eustis Sr., American judge (d. 1858)
- October 22
  - Jacob Ljunglöf, Swedish businessman (d. 1860)
  - Achille Etna Michallon, French painter (d. 1822)
  - John James Snodgrass, British military officer, author (d. 1841)
- October 23
  - William Casson, English botanist (d. 1886)
  - Stefano Franscini, mathematician, member of the Swiss Federal Council (d. 1857)
- October 24
  - August von Platen-Hallermünde, German poet (d. 1835)
  - David Roberts, Scottish painter (d. 1864)
  - Charles Waddington, army engineer, British major-general (d. 1858)
- October 25 – Henry Crewe Boutflower, British writer and minister (d. 1863)
- October 26
  - John Bennie, South African missionary (d. 1869)
  - John Campbell, 2nd Marquess of Breadalbane, British politician (d. 1862)
  - James Curley, Irish-American astronomer (d. 1889)
  - Gottfried Osann, German chemist and physicist (d. 1866)
  - Joseph Simon Volmar, Swiss painter and sculptor (d. 1865)
- October 27 – William L. Chaplin, American abolitionist (d. 1871)
- October 28
  - Charles Egon II, Prince of Fürstenberg, German politician (d. 1854)
  - Robert Wilhelm Lagerborg, Finnish politician (d. 1849)
  - John Law, American politician (d. 1873)
  - Francis Moon, Lord Mayor of London (d. 1871)
- October 29 – Richard Spencer, American politician (d. 1868)
- October 30
  - Beaubrun Ardouin, Haitian politician and historian (d. 1865)
  - Thomas William Bramston, British politician (d. 1871)
  - Wilhelm August Rieder, painter (d. 1880)
  - John Simmons, American businessman (d. 1870)
- October 31
  - Ottilie von Goethe, German writer, editor (d. 1872)
  - Samuel Trehawke Kekewich, British politician (d. 1873)

=== November ===
- November 1 – William Adam, Scottish abolitionist and Unitarian minister (d. 1881)
- November 2
  - Frederick Chamier, British writer (d. 1870)
  - Joseph Desanat, French Provençal poet and journal editor (d. 1873)
- November 3
  - Jovan Gavrilović, Serbian historian (d. 1877)
  - Friedrich Lennig, German writer (d. 1838)
- November 4
  - John Neagle, American painter (d. 1865)
  - James McNeil Stephenson, American lawyer, businessman and politician (d. 1877)
- November 5
  - Lewis F. Linn, Jacksonian Democratic U.S. Senator for the state of Missouri (d. 1843)
  - Sir Henry Thompson, 3rd Baronet, British baronet (d. 1868)
- November 6
  - George Back, British Royal Navy admiral (d. 1878)
  - Jean-Claude-Léonard Baveux, French Sulpician priest (d. 1865)
  - Charles Richard Fox, British Army general (d. 1873)
  - Bartholomew Gugy, Canadian politician (d. 1876)
  - Leopold II, Prince of Lippe, Sovereign of the Principality of Lippe (d. 1851)
- November 7
  - Alphonso Boone, American pioneer (d. 1850)
  - Edward Pery Buckley, politician (d. 1873)
  - Charles C. Hascall, American politician (d. 1862)
- November 8 – Alexandre Vattemare, French ventriloquist and philanthropist (d. 1864)
- November 10
  - François-Xavier Méthot, Canadian politician (d. 1853)
  - Jonas Webb, English farmer (d. 1862)
- November 11
  - Phan Thanh Giản, Vietnamese official (d. 1867)
  - Frederic de Peyster, American lawyer (d. 1882)
  - Joseph Swan, engraver and publisher (d. 1872)
- November 13
  - Moritz Wilhelm August Breidenbach, German jurist (d. 1857)
  - Matthew Howard-Gibbon, British officer of arms (d. 1873)
  - Erik Julin, Finnish businessperson (d. 1874)
- November 14
  - Friederike Funk, German soprano (d. 1830)
  - Alejandro Próspero Révérend, French physician (d. 1881)
  - Robert Young, Australian clergyman (d. 1865)
- November 17
  - Thomas Hills, English cricketer (d. 1866)
  - Sir Henry Willoughby, 3rd Baronet, British politician (d. 1865)
- November 18
  - Karl Arnold-Obrist, Swiss priest (d. 1862)
  - Andrew Butler, American senator (d. 1857)
  - Henry Dangar, surveyor and pastoralist in New South Wales, Australia (d. 1861)
- November 19 – Christian Lorenz Sommer, German classical philologist (d. 1846)
- November 20
  - Pierre-Louis Billaudèle, Canadian priest (d. 1869)
  - Jean Baptiste Antoine Guillemin, French botanist (d. 1842)
  - Thomas Stearn, English cricketer (d. 1862)
- November 21 – Jean Zuléma Amussat, French surgeon (d. 1856)
- November 24
  - Stephan Ludwig Roth, Transylvanian Saxon intellectual, pedagogue, Lutheran pastor (d. 1849)
  - Maltby Strong, American politician (d. 1878)
- November 25
  - Andreas von Ettingshausen, German mathematician, physicist (d. 1878)
  - Abdollah Mirza Qajar, Iranian poet and Qajar prince (d. 1846)
  - Edward Robinson, American politician (d. 1857)
- November 27
  - Gamaliel Bartlett, American postmaster (d. 1859)
  - Alexis Bonami, Canadian fur trader (d. 1890)
  - John MacEnery, British archaeologist (d. 1841)
  - Richard Mayne, English barrister, joint Commissioner of Police of the Metropolis (d. 1868)
  - Jens Vahl, Danish botanist (d. 1854)
  - John Wright, English cricketer (d. 1857)
- November 28 – Daniel William Cahill, Irish physicist (d. 1864)
- November 29 – John Hope-Johnstone, Scottish politician (d. 1876)
- November 30 – Carl Loewe, German composer (d. 1869)

=== December ===
- December 2
  - Ödön Beöthy, Hungarian nobleman, politician (d. 1854)
  - Edward Dunsterville, British naval officer and hydrographer (d. 1873)
  - William Webb Follett, English lawyer and politician (d. 1845)
  - David Spangler, American politician (d. 1856)
- December 3
  - Francis Kenrick, Catholic Bishop of Philadelphia (d. 1863)
  - Henriette Widerberg, Swedish opera soprano (d. 1872)
- December 5
  - William Arthur, father of U.S. president Chester A. Arthur (d. 1875)
  - Thomas Flower Ellis, British law reporter (d. 1861)
  - George Mortimer Tibbits, American landowner (d. 1878)
- December 6
  - Joseph W. Jackson, American politician from Georgia state (d. 1854)
  - Henry Seymour, New Zealand politician (d. 1883)
- December 7 – Michel Charles Durieu de Maisonneuve, French botanist (d. 1878)
- December 8 – Ferdinand Wolf, Romance philologist from Austria (d. 1866)
- December 9 – Emilie Zumsteeg, German composer, music teacher, choir conductor, singer, pianist (d. 1857)
- December 10 – John Burnet Biddulph, South African explorer (d. 1837)
- December 11
  - Richard Curzon-Howe, 1st Earl Howe, British earl (d. 1870)
  - Nikolai Lukash, Imperial Russian military officer and politician (d. 1868)
  - Thomas Alexander Souter, British army officer (d. 1848)
- December 12 – John Stephenson, canadian physician (d. 1842)
- December 13 – George Storrs, American minister (d. 1879)
- December 14
  - Lilburn Boggs, American politician (d. 1860)
  - Auguste Lorieux, French writer (d. 1842)
- December 15
  - Jacob Letterstedt, Swedish businessman (d. 1862)
  - Hiram Runnels, U.S. politician (d. 1857)
- December 17
  - Thomas Chandler Haliburton, Canadian-British politician, judge and author (d. 1865)
  - Christina Robertson, Scottish artist, editor (d. 1854)
- December 18
  - Peter Daniel Bruun, Danish politician and lawyer (d. 1864)
  - James Gallatin, American banker (d. 1876)
- December 19
  - Joan Aulí, Spanish composer and organist (d. 1870)
  - Manuel Bretón de los Herreros, Spanish dramatist, poet and journalist (d. 1873)
- December 20 – Simon Meister, German painter (d. 1844)
- December 21 – Tomasz Zan, Polish poet (d. 1855)
- December 22
  - George McClellan, American surgeon (d. 1847)
  - Jared W. Williams, American politician (d. 1864)
- December 24 – Tytus Działyński, Polish politician (d. 1861)
- December 25
  - Fernán Caballero, Spanish novelist (d. 1877)
  - Hugh Lee Pattinson, English industrial chemist (d. 1858)
  - Juan Esteban Pedernera, Argentine politician and military officer (d. 1886)
  - Frederick Augustus Ross, American minister (d. 1883)
- December 27
  - Mirza Ghalib, Persian poet of Urdu (d. 1869)
  - Franciszek Pfanhauser, Polish painter (d. 1865)
  - Karl Friedrich von Steinmetz, Prussian field marshal (d. 1877)
- December 29
  - William B. Calhoun, American politician (d. 1865)
  - Johann Christian Poggendorff, German physicist (d. 1877)
  - Ferdinand von Wrangel, Baltic German explorer and Russian admiral (d. 1870)
- December 30 – Miklós Wesselényi, Hungarian politician (d. 1850)

Date unknown

- Du Bois Agett, early settler of Western Australia (d. 1866)
- Edwin Beard Budding, English engineer and inventor of the lawnmower (d. 1846)
- Mirza Shafi Vazeh, Azeri poet (d. 1852)

== Deaths ==
=== January–March ===
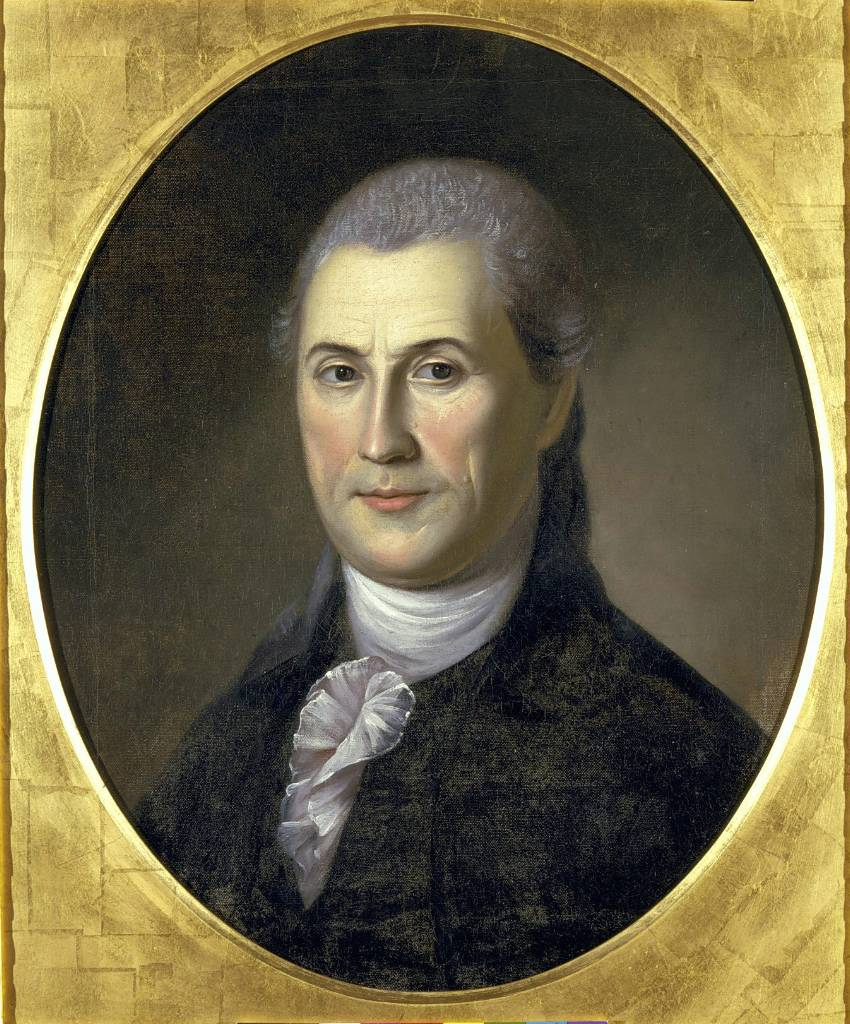
Samuel Huntington

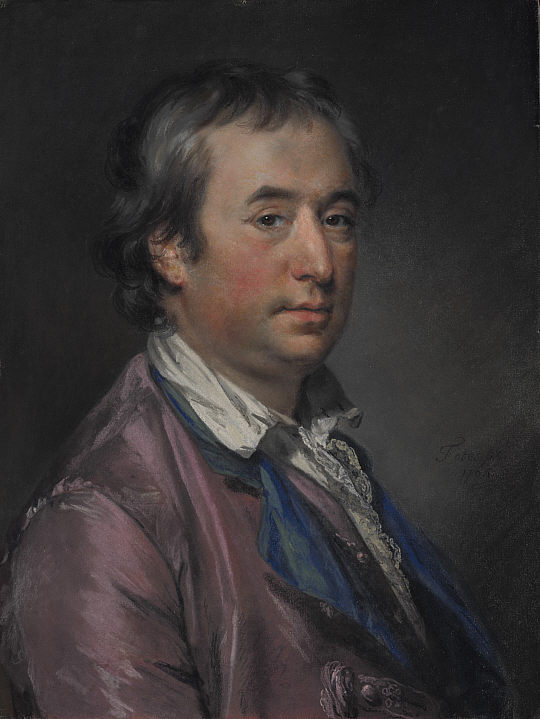
William Chambers (architect)

- January 1
  - Alexandre-Théophile Vandermonde French musician and chemist (b. 1735)
  - Giambattista Vasco, Italian economist (b. 1733)
- January 5 – Samuel Huntington, Connecticut jurist (b. 1731)
- January 5 – Anna Barbara Reinhart, Swiss mathematician (b. 1730)
- January 13 – John Anderson, Scottish scientist and inventor (b. 1726)
- February 7 – Sir Francis Geary, 1st Baronet, officer of the British Royal Navy (b. 1709)
- February 14 – Samuel Pegge, English antiquary (b. 1704)
- February 15 – John Caesar Australian bushranger of African descent (b. 1763)
- February 17 – James Macpherson, Scottish writer (b. 1736)
- February 25 – Jean-Nicolas Stofflet, French royalist general (executed) (b. 1751)
- February 28 – Friedrich Wilhelm Rust, German violinist (b. 1739)
- March 1 – Carl Fredrik Adelcrantz, Swedish architect and civil servant (b. 1716)
- March 3 – Pierre-René Rogue, French Catholic priest, member of the Congregation of the Mission (b. 1758)
- March 6 – Guillaume Thomas François Raynal, French writer, man of letters during the Age of Enlightenment (b. 1713)
- March 10
  - William Chambers, Scottish-Swedish architect (b. 1723)
  - John Forbes, British Royal Navy officer (b. 1714)
- March 12 – Franz Töpsl, Augustinian Canon Regular (b. 1711)
- March 16 – Joseph Gerrald, Scottish political reformer (b. 1763)
- March 19 – Hugh Palliser, British naval officer, administrator (b. 1722)
- March 26 – François de Charette, French Royalist soldier, politician (b. 1763)
- March 30 – Princess Augusta Wilhelmine of Hesse-Darmstadt (b. 1765)

=== April–June ===
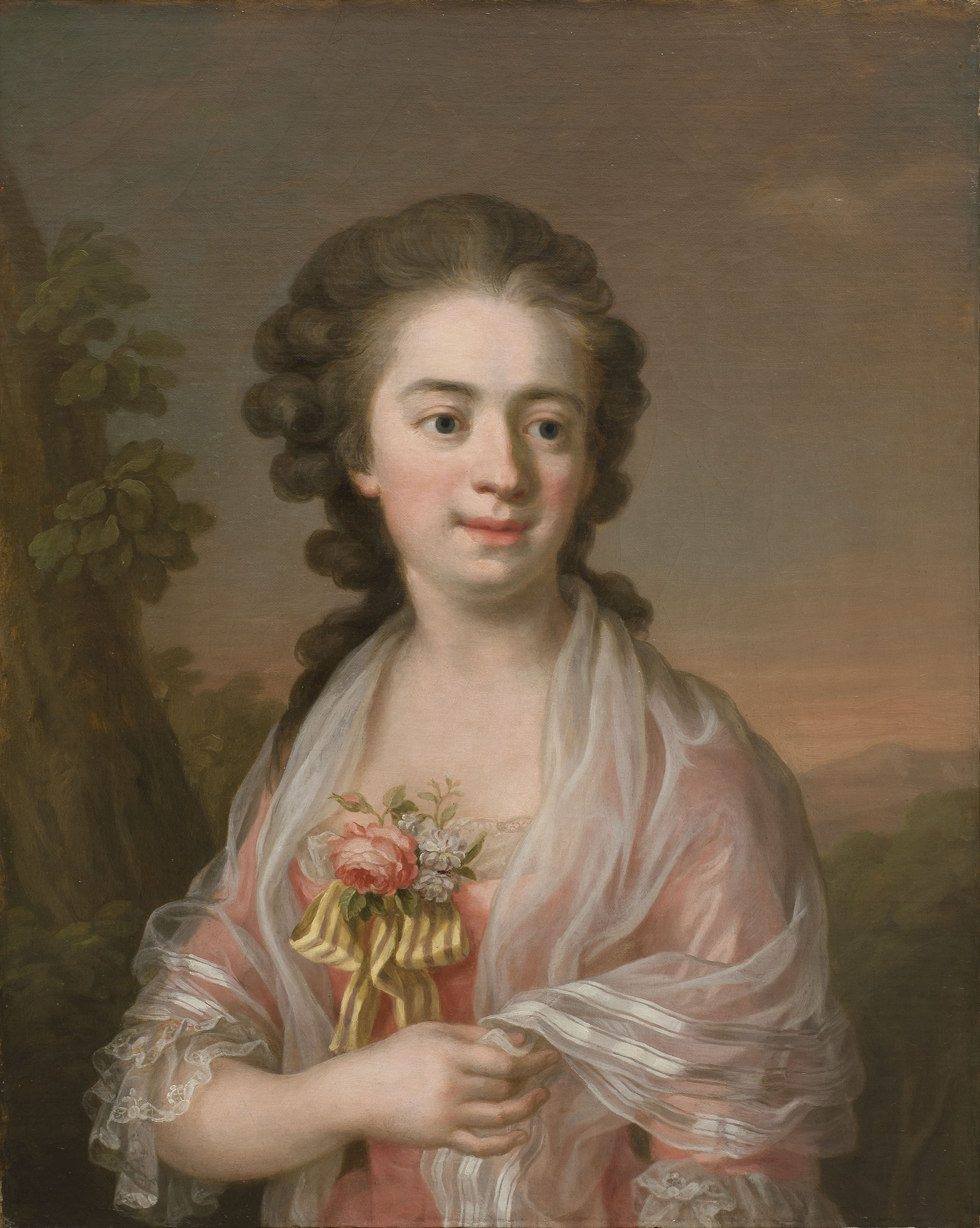
Ulrika Pasch

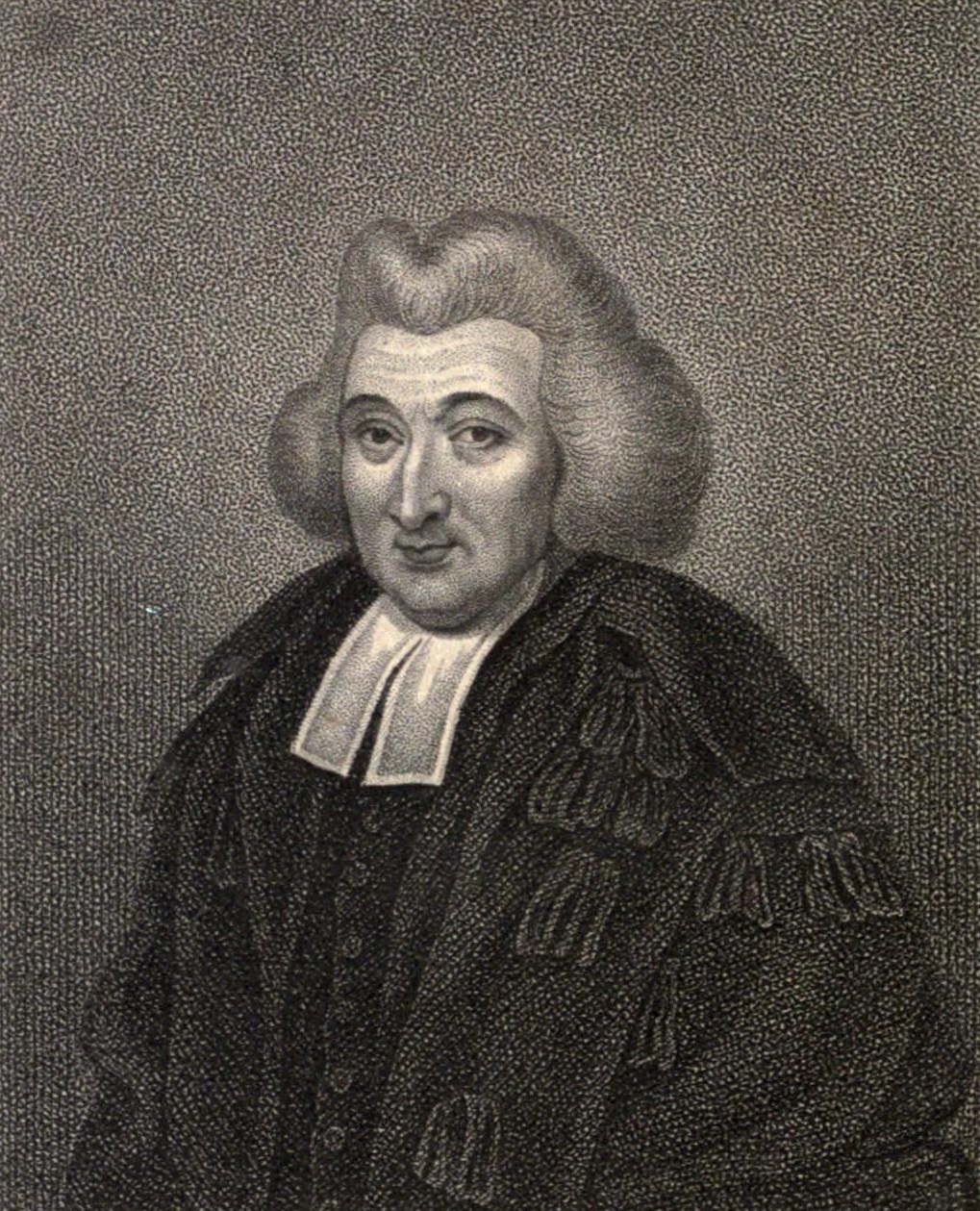
George Campbell

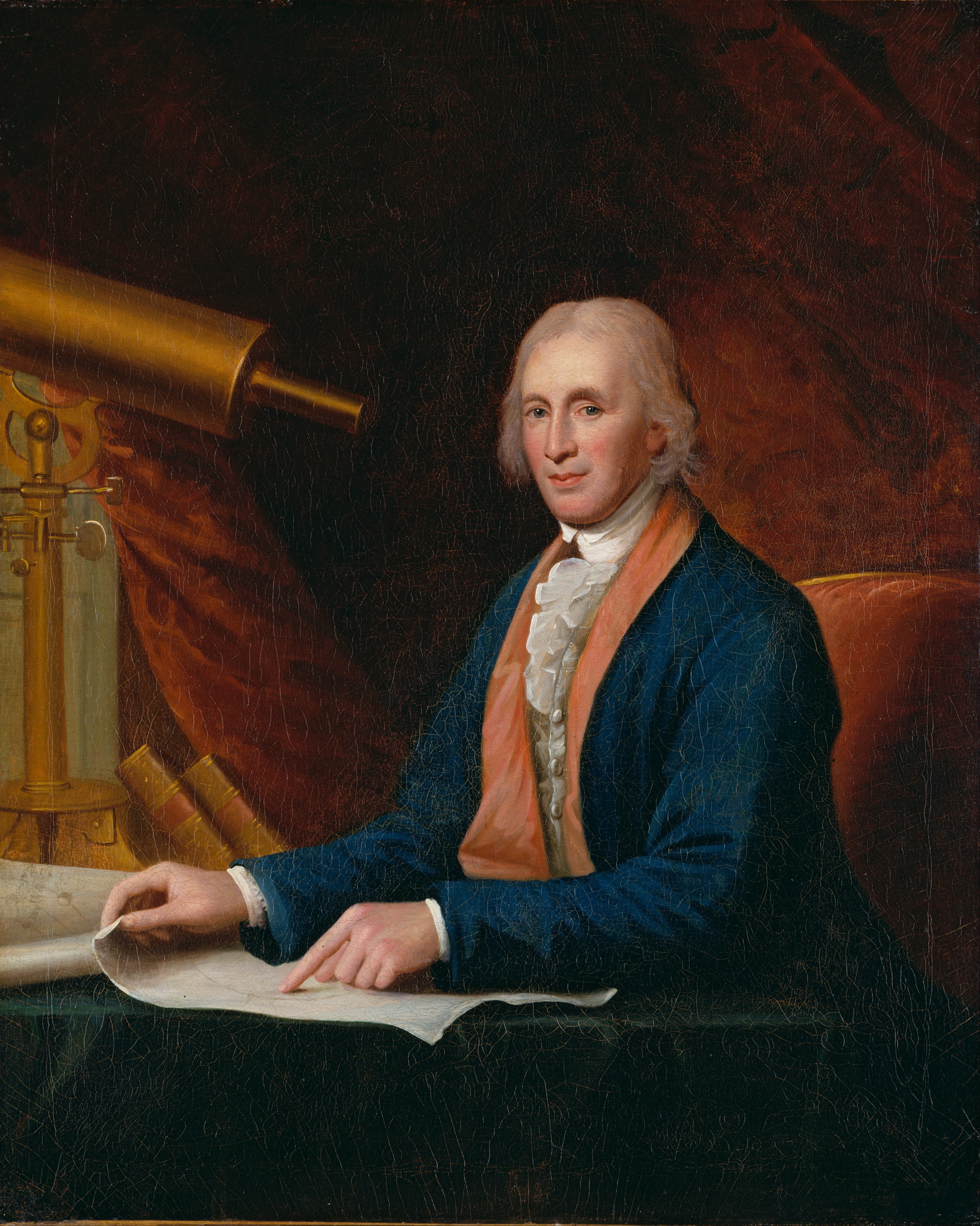
David Rittenhouse

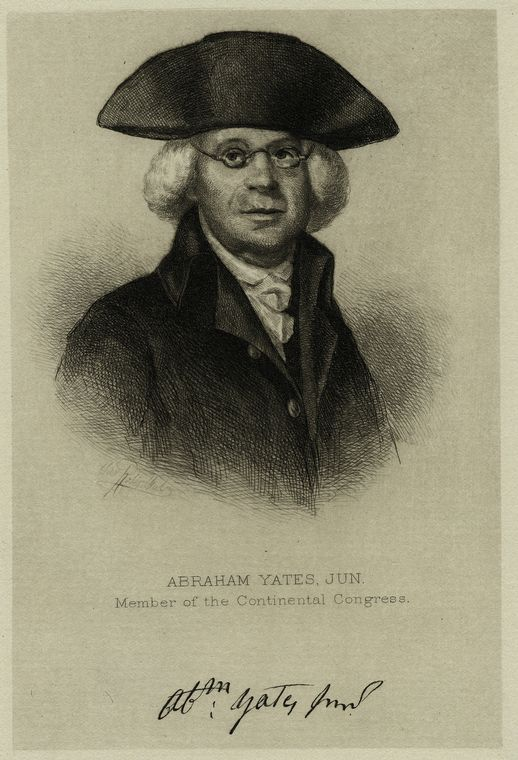
Abraham Yates Jr.

- April 2 – Ulrika Pasch, Swedish rococo painter and miniaturist (b. 1735)
- April 6 – George Campbell, Scottish minister (b. 1719)
- April 9 – Frederick Albert, Prince of Anhalt-Bernburg, German prince of the House of Ascania (b. 1735)
- April 11 – François-Antoine Devaux, French writer (b. 1712)
- April 16 – Molly Brant Mohawk United Empire Loyalist (b. c.1736)
- April 17 – Raja Chamaraja Wodeyar IX of Mysore (b. 1774)
- April 30 – Franciszka Corvin-Krasińska, Polish noblewoman, morganatic wife of Charles of Saxony (b. 1742)
- May 1 – Alexandre Guy Pingré, Catholic priest and scientist (b. 1711)
- May 2 – Juan García Ruiz, bishop of Nueva Segovia (1784–1796) (b. 1728)
- May 6 – Adolph Freiherr Knigge, German writer, Freemason (b. 1752)
- May 12 – Johann Uz, German poet (b. 1720)
- May 13 – John Butler, Loyalist who led an irregular militia unit during the American Revolutionary War (b. 1728)
- May 17 – Gotthard Friedrich Stender, Baltic-German Lutheran priest who played an outstanding role in Latvia's history of culture (b. 1714)
- May 28 – Caroline of Stolberg-Gedern, Princess of Stolberg-Gerdern by birth and by marriage a princess of Hohenlohe-Langenburg (b. 1732)
- May 29 – Carl Fredrik Pechlin, Swedish politician and demagogue (b. 1720)
- June 7 – Elisabetta Caminèr Turra, Venetian writer (b. 1751)
- June 8
  - Jean-Marie Collot d'Herbois, French revolutionary (b. 1749)
  - Felice Giardini, Italian composer, violinist (b. 1716)
- June 9 – José Álvarez de Toledo, Duke of Alba, patron of the artist Francisco Goya (b. 1756)
- June 11
  - Nathaniel Gorham, Massachusetts politician, merchant (b. 1738)
  - Samuel Whitbread, English brewer, politician (b. 1720)
- June 14
  - Charles Albert II, Prince of Hohenlohe-Waldenburg-Schillingsfürst, 3rd Prince of Hohenlohe-Waldenburg-Schillingsfürst from 1793 to 1796 (b. 1742)
  - John Laforey, British naval officer (b. 1729)
- June 16
  - Charles of Saxony, Duke of Courland, German prince from the House of Wettin and Duke of Courland (b. 1733)
  - Walter Stewart, Irish-born American general during the American Revolutionary War (b. 1756)
- June 19 – Consider Tiffany, British loyalist (b. 1732)
- June 21 – Richard Gridley, American Revolutionary soldier (b. 1710)
- June 25 – Johann Philipp Siebenkees, German philosopher (b. 1759)
- June 26 – David Rittenhouse, American astronomer, inventor, mathematician, surveyor, scientific instrument craftsman and public official (b. 1732)
- June 28 – Antonio Maria Lorgna, Italian mathematician (b. 1735)
- June 30 – Abraham Yates Jr., American lawyer, civil servant from Albany (b. 1724)

=== July–September ===
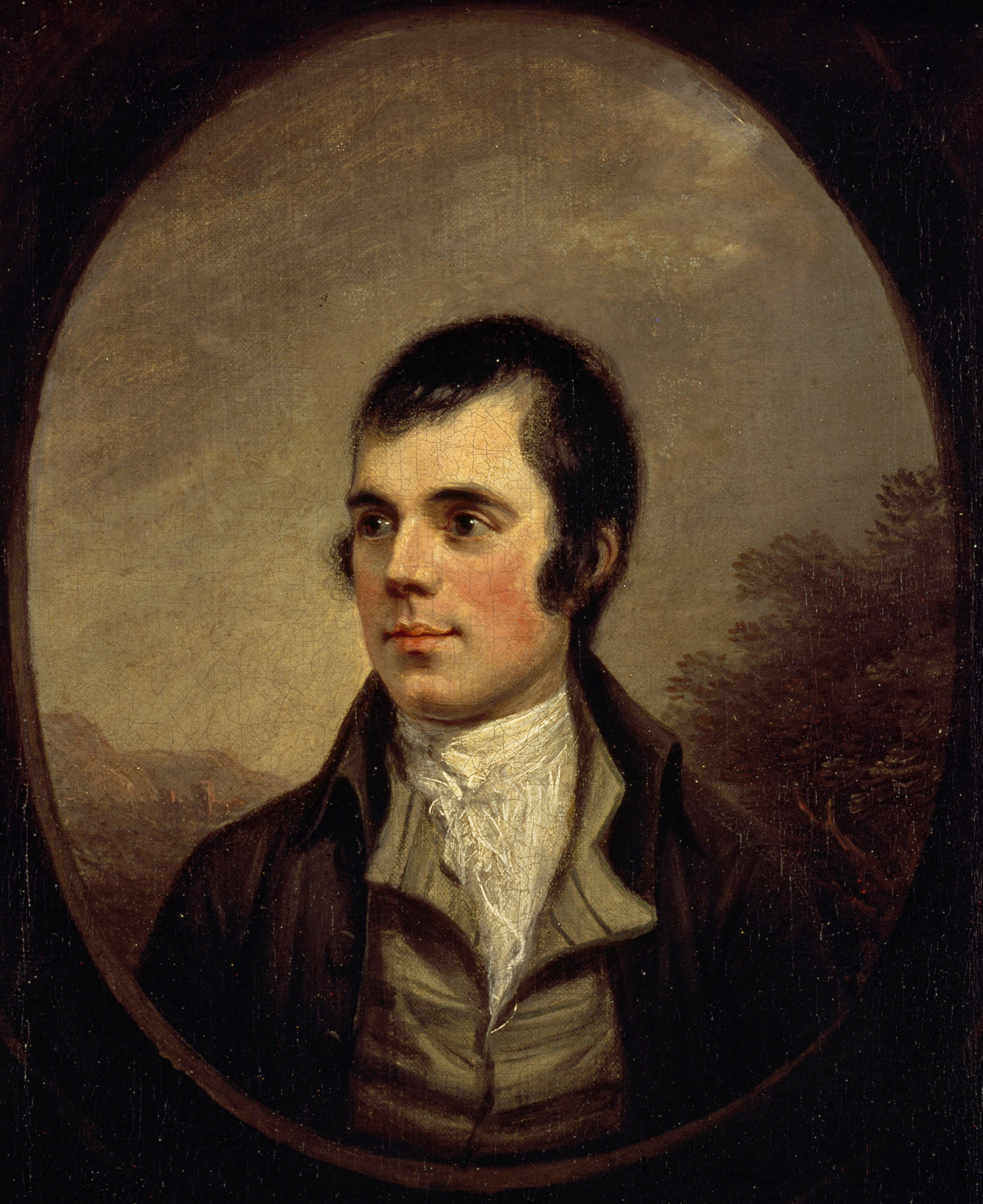
Robert Burns

- July 8
  - John Mills, American soldier, officer (b. 1754)
  - Adam Naruszewicz, Polish-Lithuanian nobleman (b. 1733)
- July 16
  - William Gerard Hamilton, English statesman (b. 1729)
  - George Howard, British field marshal (b. 1718)
- July 17 – John Christopher Hartwick, Lutheran minister in Colonial America, founder of Hartwick College (b. 1714)
- July 20 – John Houstoun, American lawyer, statesman from Savannah (b. 1744)
- July 21
  - Robert Burns, Scottish poet (b. 1759)
  - Philip Carteret, British naval officer, explorer in two circumnavigation expeditions (b. 1733)
- August 1
  - Robert Pigot, 2nd Baronet, British Army officer during the American Revolutionary War (b. 1720)
  - Sir Robert Pigot, 2nd Baronet, British army officer (b. 1720)
- August 2 – Sarah Osborn, American writer (b. 1714)
- August 10 – Ignaz Anton von Indermauer, Austrian nobleman from Tyrol, Landvögte and Kreishauptmann of Vorarlberg (b. 1759)
- August 12
  - Richard Beckford, English member of parliament
  - Mary Ann Wrighten, English singer, actress (b. 1751)
- August 25 – Isaac Parsons, American planter (b. 1752)
- August 31 – John McKinly, American physician, politician from Wilmington (b. 1721)
- September 1 – David Murray, 2nd Earl of Mansfield (b. 1727)
- September 7 – Henri François Lambert, brigadier general of the French revolutionary army (b. 1760)
- September 11 – Anna Barbara Gignoux, German industrialist (b. 1725)
- September 20
  - Juan José Elhuyar, Spanish chemist, mineralogist (b. 1754)
  - Christian Febiger, American Revolutionary War commander (b. 1749)
- September 21 – François Séverin Marceau-Desgraviers, French revolutionary general (killed in battle) (b. 1769)
- September 27 – Jonathan Sewall, last British attorney general of Massachusetts (b. 1729)
- September 29 – Henry Hamilton, Anglo-Irish soldier, government official of the British Empire (b. c. 1734)

=== October–December ===
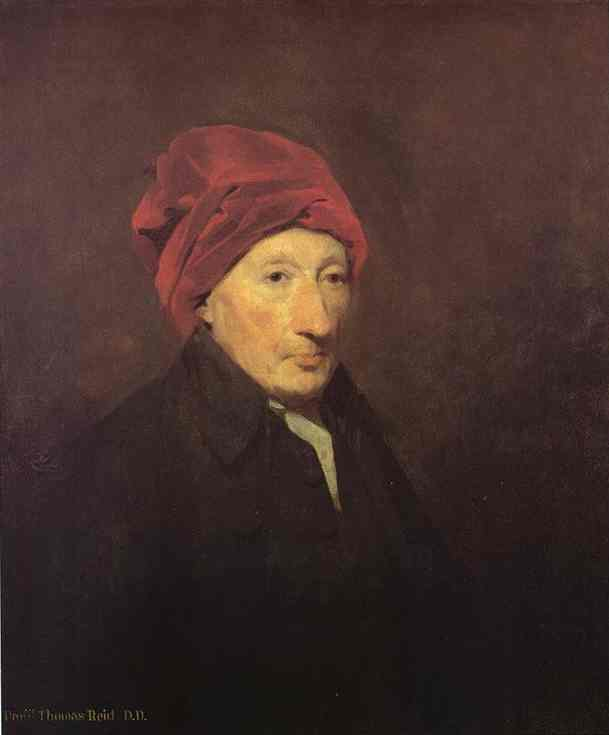
Thomas Reid

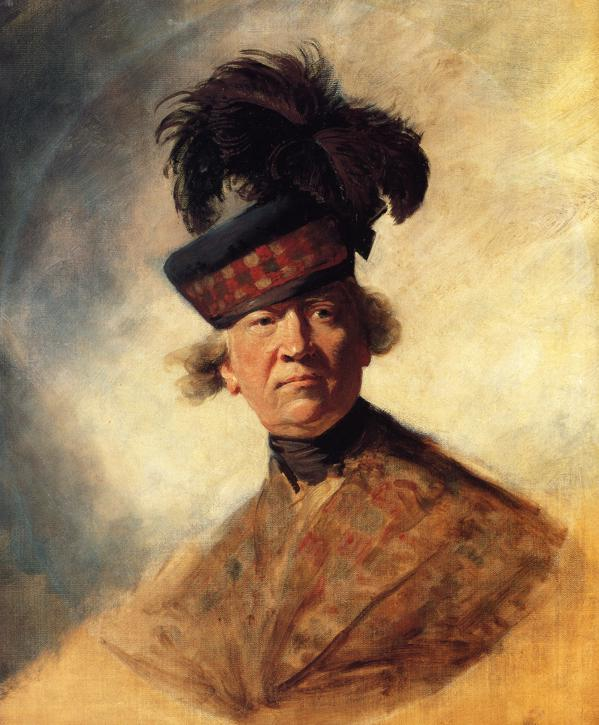
Archibald Montgomerie, 11th Earl of Eglinton

- October 7 – Thomas Reid, religiously trained Scottish philosopher (b. 1710)
- October 10 – Juliana Maria of Brunswick-Wolfenbüttel (b. 1729)
- October 16
  - Antoine-Joseph Pernety, French writer (b. 1716)
  - Victor Amadeus III, King of Sardinia (b. 1726)
- October 30 – Archibald Montgomerie, 11th Earl of Eglinton, Scottish general (b. 1726)
- November 8 – King Ang Eng of Cambodia (b. 1773)
- November 17 – Empress Catherine II of Russia (b. 1729)
- November 19 – Thomas Thynne, 1st Marquess of Bath (b. 1734)
- December 2 – Jean Charles Abbatucci, French general during the War of the First Coalition (b. 1771)
- December 5 – George Mason V, American planter, businessman (b. 1753)
- December 10 – Israel Jacobs, colonial Pennsylvania Legislator and United States Representative from Pennsylvania (b. 1726)
- December 12 – William Buller, English clergyman (b. 1735)
- December 15 – Anthony Wayne, United States Army officer, statesman, and member of the United States House of Representatives (b. 1745)
- December 16 – Johann Daniel Titius, German astronomer, professor at Wittenberg (b. 1729)
- December 18 – Lord John Cavendish, British nobleman, statesman (b. 1732)
- December 19 – Pyotr Rumyantsev, Russian general (b. 1725)
- December 25
  - Bengt Anders Euphrasén, Swedish botanist (b. 1756)
  - Velu Nachiyar, Indian queen of Sivaganga estate (1760–1790) (b. 1730)
- December 28 – Prince Louis Charles of Prussia, son of Frederick William II of Prussia and Frederika Louisa of Hesse-Darmstadt (b. 1773)
