= Parnasso in festa =

1734 opera by Handel

George Frideric Handel

Parnasso in festa, per li sponsali di Teti e Peleo ("Parnassos in celebration for the nuptials of Thetis and Peleus", HWV 73), by George Frideric Handel, is a festa teatrale, a form also called a "serenata", a type of Italian opera intended as entertainment to celebrate a festive royal or state occasion. The work was written to celebrate the marriage of Anne, Princess Royal and Prince William of Orange. Parnasso in festa had its first performance in London at the King's Theatre on 13 March 1734 and was repeated five times. The operatic entertainment, to an anonymous libretto, was such a success at its London premiere that although it was intended as a one-off production for a royal wedding, Parnasso in festa was revived by Handel in several subsequent seasons.

== Background ==
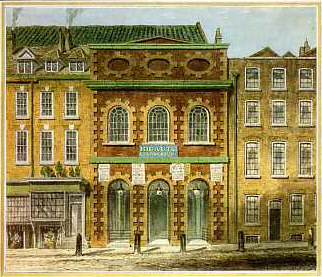
London King's Theatre Haymarket, where Parnasso in festa was first performed

The German-born Handel had been resident in London since 1712 and had there achieved great success as a composer of Italian operas. He had also enjoyed the patronage of monarchs Queen Anne, George I and George II and other members of the royal family and had been commissioned by them to compose numerous pieces of music for worship services in the royal chapels as well as for other royal occasions. Handel enjoyed a particularly warm and close relationship with Anne, Princess Royal, eldest daughter of George II, who supported his opera seasons, was an accomplished musician herself, and to whom Handel even gave private lessons – although he did not enjoy teaching, he made an exception in her case. Handel composed the anthem for her wedding, "This is the day which the Lord hath made", to Biblical texts selected by Anne herself, which was performed at her marriage to William IV, Prince of Orange, at the French chapel in St James's Palace on 14 March 1734. The evening before the wedding, the princess, the rest of the royal family and all their court attended the first performance of Parnasso in festa, specially composed by Handel for the occasion to an anonymous Italian text, at the King's Theatre in the Haymarket where he was presenting his seasons of Italian operas, and with the same star opera singers who were appearing in his current successful opera "Arianna in Creta".

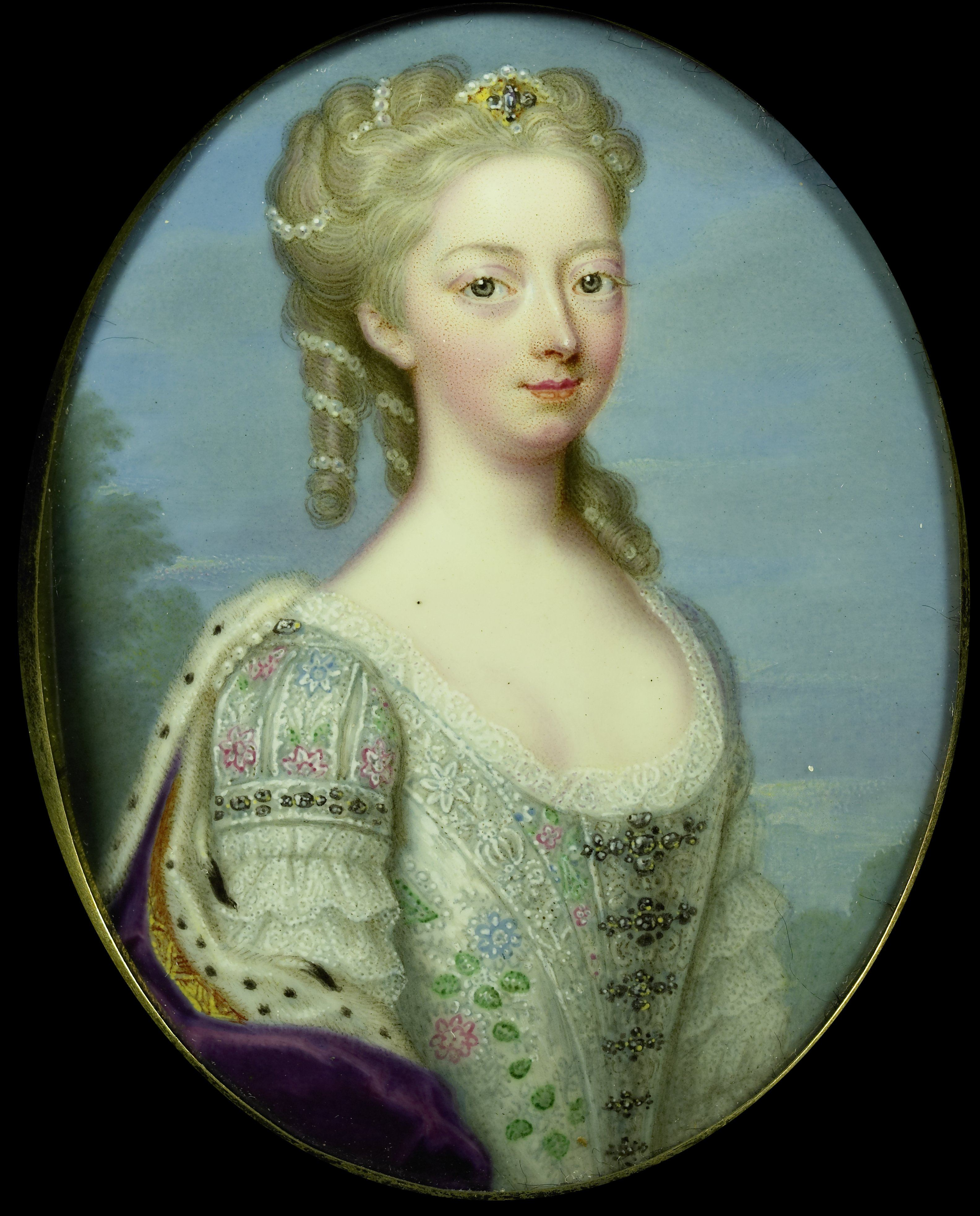
Anne, Princess Royal

A few days before the first performance, London newspaper The Daily Journal reported on the anticipation with which this full length operatic entertainment in three parts was awaited:

We hear amongst other publick Diversions that are prepared for the Solemnity of the approaching Nuptials, there is to be perform’d at the Opera House in the Haymarket, on Wednesday next, a Serenata, call’d, Parnasso in Festa. The Fable is, Apollo and the Muses, celebrating the Marriage of Thetis and Peleus. There is one standing Scene which is Mount Parnassus, on which sit Apollo and the Muses, assisted with other proper Characters, emblematically dress’d, the whole Appearance being extreamly magnificent. The Musick is no less entertaining, being contrived with so great a variety, that all sorts of Musick are properly introduc’d in single Songs, Duetto’s, &c. intermix’d with Chorus’s, some what in the Style of Oratorio’s. People have been waiting with Impatience for this Piece, the celebrated Mr. Handel having exerted his utmost Skill in it.

Parnasso in festa is Handel's only full scale "festa teatrale" or "serenata", a form popular in Italy to celebrate royal weddings and other festive state occasions, but rare in England. From the above newspaper description, it can be seen that there was one set only, the singers were in costume but probably did not move around on the stage, and the musical emphasis was on entertainment and variety rather than, as in the operas, depth of emotion and sometimes tragic feelings. The choruses referred to were probably performed, as in Handel's Italian operas, by no greater forces than the soloists singing together.

In Parnasso in festa, Handel re-used much of the music he had composed for the English oratorio "Athalia", which had been presented in Oxford on 10 July 1733 "to immense applause". Re-using music in this way, especially for an audience in a different location than the one where it had been heard first, was a common practice of Handel's and of other composers of the time. 18th century musicologist Charles Burney observed of Parnasso in festa that the music "was new to the ears of the greatest part of a London audience; and Handel with all the riches of his genius and invention, was very economical, and as frequently turned and patched up his old productions, as if he had laboured under indigence of thought." However a substantial portion of the music of Parnasso in festa was newly composed for the piece.

== Roles ==
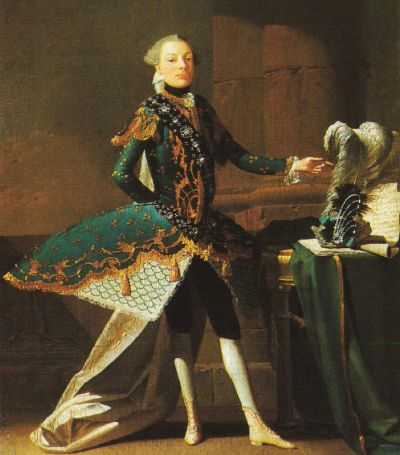
Carlo Scalzi, creator of the role of Orfeo in Parnasso in festa

Roles, voice types, and premiere cast
Roles	Voice type	Premiere cast, 13 March 1734
Apollo	mezzo-soprano castrato	Giovanni Carestini
Clio, a muse	soprano	Anna Maria Strada
Orfeo	mezzo-soprano castrato	Carlo Scalzi
Calliope, a muse	mezzo-soprano	Margherita Durastanti
Clori, a huntress	contralto	Maria Caterina Negri
Euterpe, a muse	soprano	Rosa Negri
Mars	bass	Gustavus Waltz
Chorus of nymphs and shepherds

== Synopsis ==
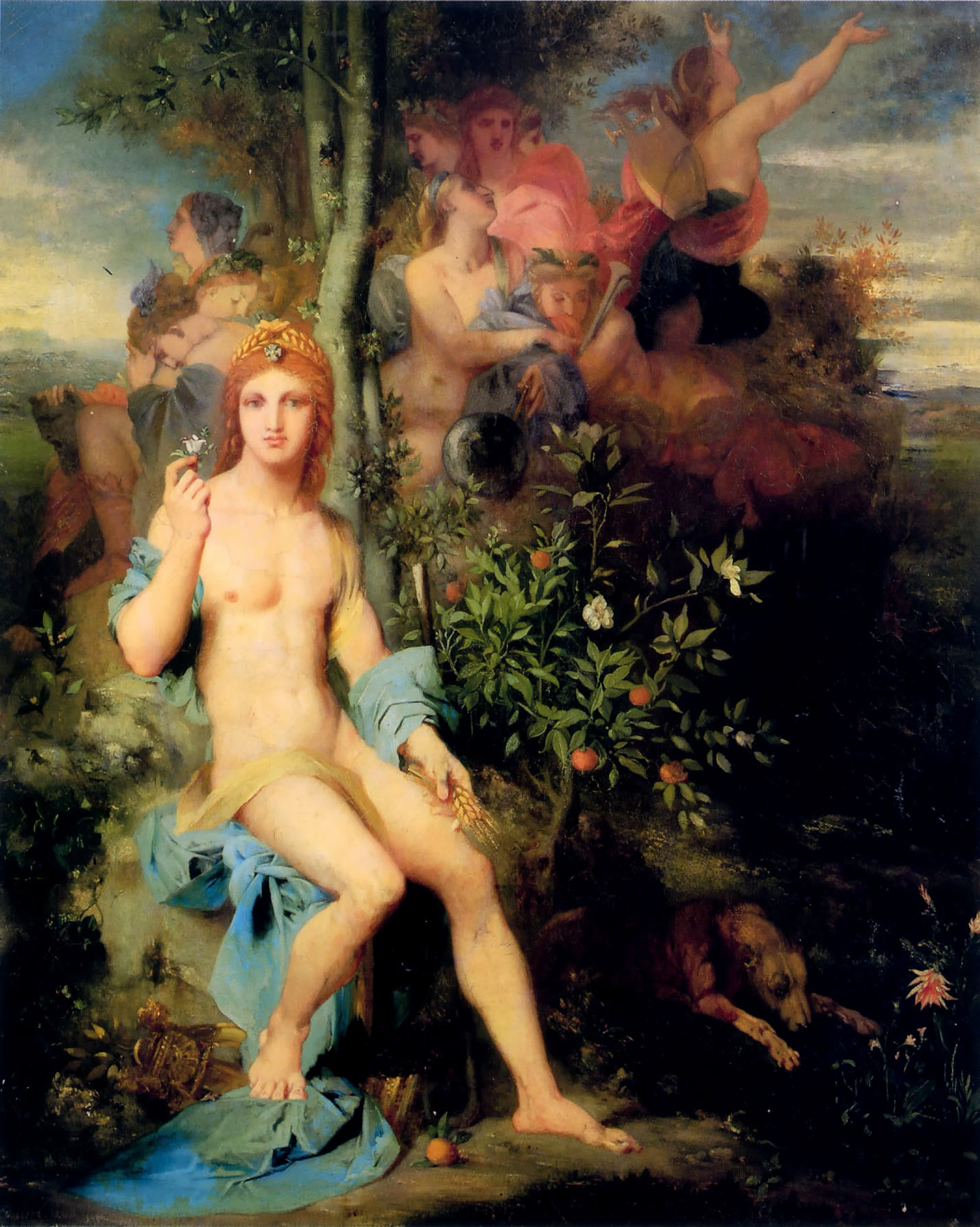
Apollo and The Nine Muses by Gustave Moreau

=== Part 1 ===
The scene represents Mount Parnassus, where the Muses and the god Apollo are gathering to celebrate the wedding of Prince Peleus, a mortal, and Thetis, a sea nymph. Orpheus, son of Apollo and a famed musician, also arrives for the marriage celebrations. Clio, muse of history, reminds Apollo of an episode in his own love life, when, enamoured of the nymph Daphne, he pursued her with lustful intent, but she prayed to the gods to be spared and was transformed into a laurel tree. As if embarrassed by this story, Apollo invites all to join him in drinking in praise of Bacchus. Mars, god of war, leads everyone in a drinking song, and Clio joins in the spirit of things so much that she begins to feel inebriated, much to the amusement of Orpheus' mother, Calliope, muse of epic poetry, and the chorus.

=== Part 2 ===
The muses sing in turn in praise of Orpheus' great command of musical expression. Orpheus however is still inconsolable at the loss of his beloved wife Eurydice. He had descended into the underworld to rescue her after her death, but lost her for a second time when he could not restrain himself, as he had been instructed by the god of the underworld, from looking at her until they were back in the land of the living. Apollo and the muses tell Orpheus that his love for Eurydice will inspire all future generations, and the love of the royal couple Peleus and Thetis will bless the whole earth. Apollo orders the Tritons to blow upon their conch shells, represented by horns in the orchestra, to inaugurate the wedding festivities.

=== Part 3 ===
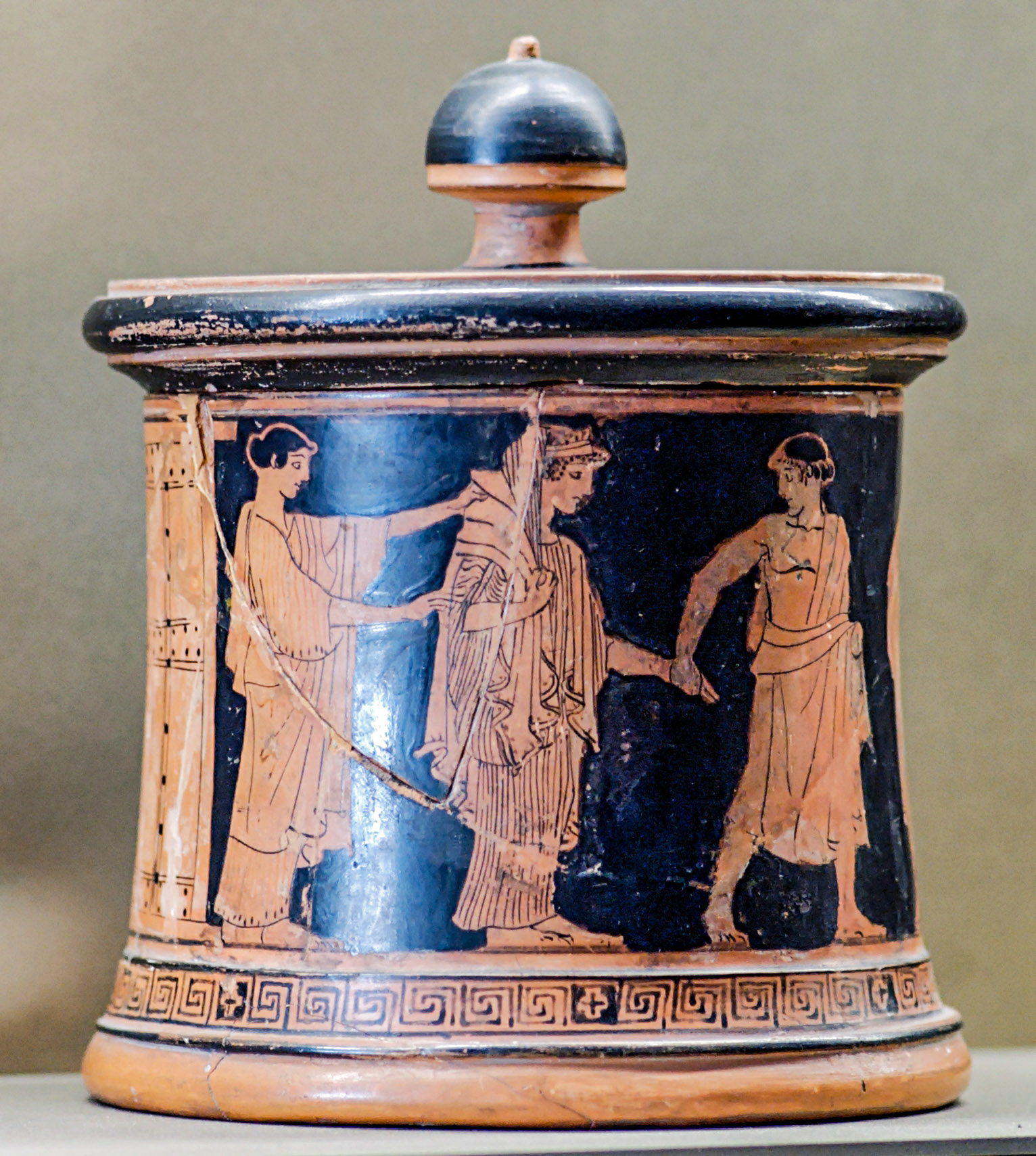
Peleus and Thetis, Louvre

Gods and muses, nymphs and shepherds, join in the celebrations of the wedding of Peleus and Thetis, wishing the newly-weds long lives, hoping that they will be an example of virtue for the world, and prophesying that they will produce a line of heroes. Jove himself has proclaimed, say the chorus, that the royal couple will live happily ever after.

== Musical features ==
To his usual opera orchestra of strings, bassoons, oboe and continuo instruments, Handel adds for Parnasso in festa flutes, horns, recorders, trumpets, and timpani. The music from the solemn biblical oratorio Athalia was skilfully re-worked by Handel into the secular entertainment on a pagan theme that is Parnasso in festa. Paul Henry Lang notes the "cheerful and lusty" hunting chorus "O quando bello gloria" and praises Apollo's song to the flowers and fauns "Non tardarte fauni" as "Handel at his pastoral best". Despite the light-hearted and celebratory nature of the piece, the music for Orpheus' lament for his lost wife is profound and deeply felt, with the work's only accompanied recitative, typically used by Handel for a piece's most emotional passages. A number of solo instrumental passages for cello, flute, oboe and bassoon "offer never-ending pleasant surprises".

== Reception and performance history ==
The work was highly praised by the audience, Handel's friends and supporters, and the press. A notice in a London newspaper, The Bee, stated: "Last Night Mr Handell’s new Serenata ... was received with the greatest Applause; the Piece containing the most exquisite Harmony ever furnish’d from the Stage, and the Disposition of the Performers being contriv’d in a very grand and magnificent Manner." So popular and successful was the piece that Handel revived it for his seasons in 1737, 1740, and 1741. After these performances in Handel's lifetime, however, Parnasso in festa was not performed again until 1972 in London with the Handel Opera Society. With the increased interest since the 1960s in Baroque music and historically informed musical performance, the piece is now performed more often. Among other performances, Parnasso in Festa was performed by New Chamber Opera UK in 1997 and at the Handel Festival, Halle in 2014.

== Recordings ==
- Andrea Marcon, David Hansen, Robin Johannsen, Kangmin Justin Kim, Jenny Högstrom, Silke Gäng, Francesca Ascioti, Luca Tittoto, La Cetra Barockorchester Basel, La Cetra Vokalensemble Basel. CD: PENTATONE PTC 5186643 (2017).
- Carolyn Sampson, soprano, Diana Moore, soprano, Lucy Crowe, soprano, Rebecca Outram, soprano, Ruth Clegg, contralto, Peter Harvey, bass, The King's Consort, conductor Matthew Halls. CD: Hyperion Records CDA67701/2.
