= Maria Caterina Negri =

Italian opera singer

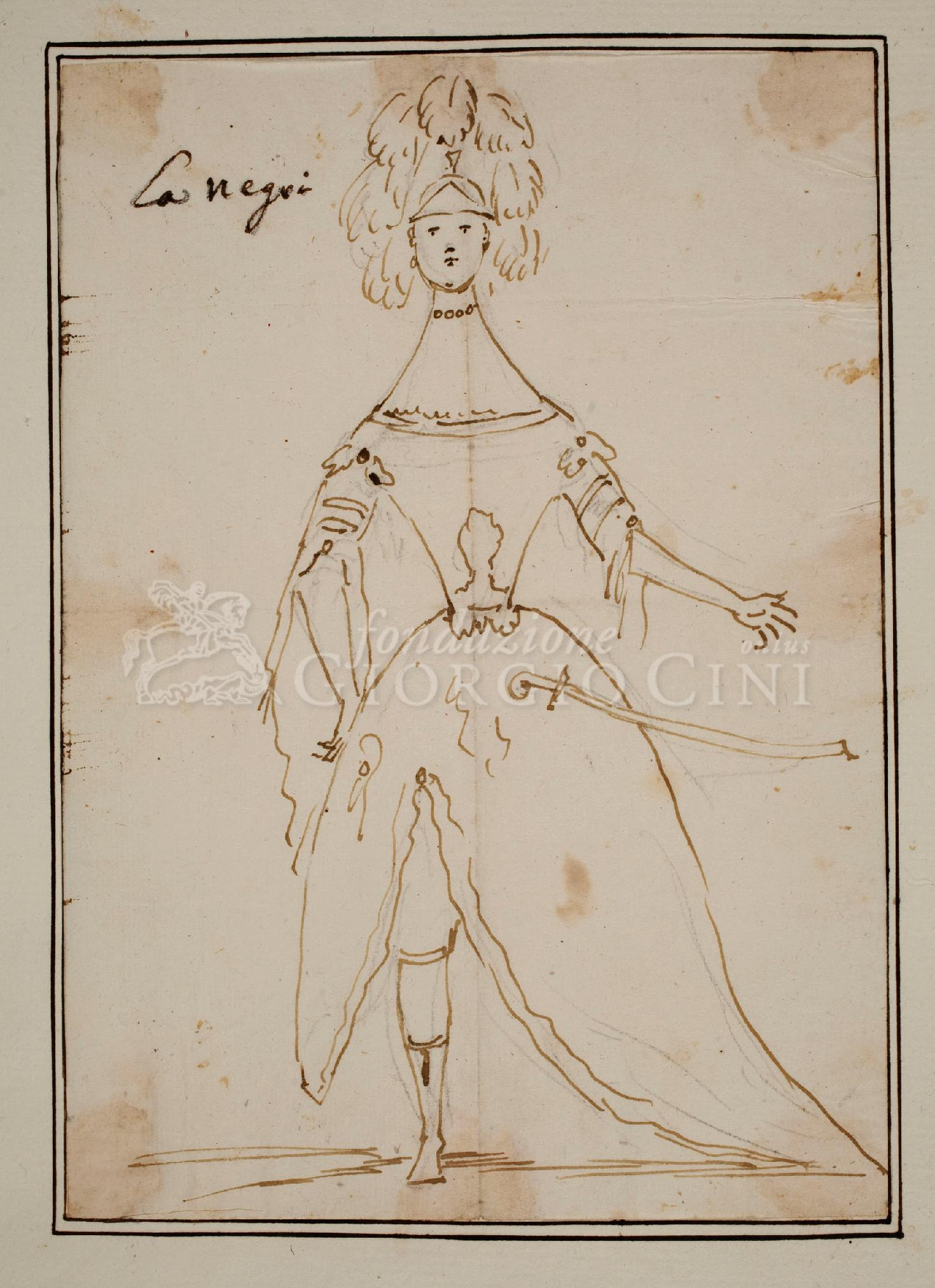
"La Negri" in a knight costume (a caricature by Anton Maria Zanetti probably depicting Maria Caterina Negri)

Maria Caterina Negri (28 September 1704 – after 1744) was an Italian contralto who created numerous roles in 18th-century operas, including many by George Frideric Handel. She primarily portrayed male characters en travesti or female warriors such as Bradamante. Negri was born in Bologna and made her debut there at the age of 15. Her last known performance was in 1744. The date and place of her death are unknown. In its prime, her voice was known for its agility and wide vocal range. (Note: Negri's middle name is sometimes spelled "Catterina" in 18th-century sources. She has sometimes been confused with two other non-related 18th-century singers, Maria Negri and Antonia Negri Tomii as well as with her elder sister Maria Rosa Negri.)

== Life and career ==
Negri was born in Bologna to Teresa née Maranelli and Antonio Negri. Little is known about her early life or training, although according to François-Joseph Fétis she studied under the castrato singer Antonio Pasi in Bologna. She was barely 15 when she made her debut at the Teatro Formagliari Bologna during the 1719 carnival season in Bononcini's Il trionfo di Camilla and Predieri's La Partenope. She sang in various theatres in Italy until 1724, when she joined the opera company of Antonio Denzio who ran Franz Anton von Sporck's theatre in Prague.

Negri returned to Italy in 1727 where she sang with Vivaldi's company at the Teatro Sant'Angelo in Venice for two seasons. According to Vivaldi's biographer Egidio Pozzi, Negri was known for her fiery temperament both on and off stage. The previous year in Prague her furious dispute with the impresario of Sporck's theatre, Antonio Denzio, ended in the police arriving at her house threatening her with arrest for breach of contract. In Venice, Vivaldi cast her as the tyrant king Arsace in Rosilena ed Oronta and the female warrior Bradamante in Orlando furioso, a character she would reprise in Handel's Alcina six years later. Appearances in other Italian cities followed over the next five years as well as an appearance in Frankfurt in 1732 when she sang in the premiere of Giuseppe Maria Nelvi's Siface re di Numidia.

From the autumn of 1733 until the summer of 1737, she sang with Handel's Italian opera company in London, first at the King's Theatre and then at the Theatre Royal, where as seconda donna she appeared in numerous operas, oratorios, and feste teatrali. She then returned to Italy where she continued to perform and also sang in Lisbon in January 1740. Her last known performance was in Bologna in August 1744 in Gli sponsali di Enea by Lorenzo Gibelli. After that all trace of her disappeared. Her date of death is unknown.

According to musicologist Giovanni Andrea Sechi, one of Anton Maria Zanetti's drawings of a female singer en travesti and labelled by him as "La Negri" is in all probability a portrait of her and not of the soprano Antonia Negri Tomii (known as "La Mestrina ") as previously thought.

== Roles created ==
- Elvira in Giuseppe Maria Buini's La fede ne' tradimenti (Teatro dell'Accademia dei Remoti, Faenza, 26 March 1723) (Note: Unless otherwise indicated, all entries in this section are referenced to Casaglia (2005))
- Bradamante in Vivaldi's Orlando furioso (Teatro Sant'Angelo, Venice, November 1727)
- Arsace in Vivaldi's Rosilena ed Oronta (Teatro Sant'Angelo, Venice, January 1728)
- Virate in Giuseppe Maria Nelvi's Siface re di Numidia (Frankfurt, January 1732)
- Carilda in Handel's Arianna in Creta (King's Theatre, London, 26 January 1734)
- Clori in Handel's Parnasso in festa (King's Theatre, London, 13 March 1734)
- Filotete in Handel's Oreste (Theatre Royal, London, 18 December 1734)
- Polinesso in Handel's Ariodante (Theatre Royal, London, 8 January 1735)
- Bradamante in Handel's Alcina (Theatre Royal, London, 16 April 1735)
- Irene in Handel's Atalanta (Theatre Royal, London, 12 May 1736)
- Tullio in Handel's Arminio (Theatre Royal, London, 12 January 1737)
- Amanzio in Handel's Giustino (Theatre Royal, London, 16 February 1737)
- Arsace in Handel's Berenice (Theatre Royal, London, 18 May 1737)
