= Engert (name) =

Engert is a surname, and possibly an occasional given name. Notable people with this name include:

- Cornelius Van Hemert Engert (1887–1985), American diplomat
- Erasmus Engert (1796–1871), Austrian painter and art restorer
- Hans Engert (1951–2020), German tennis player
- Ruthild Engert-Ely (1940–2013), German opera singer
- Thomas Engert, German pool player
- Engert Bakalli (born 1976), Albanian footballer, also spelt Egert Bakalli
