= Neil Shicoff =

American opera singer

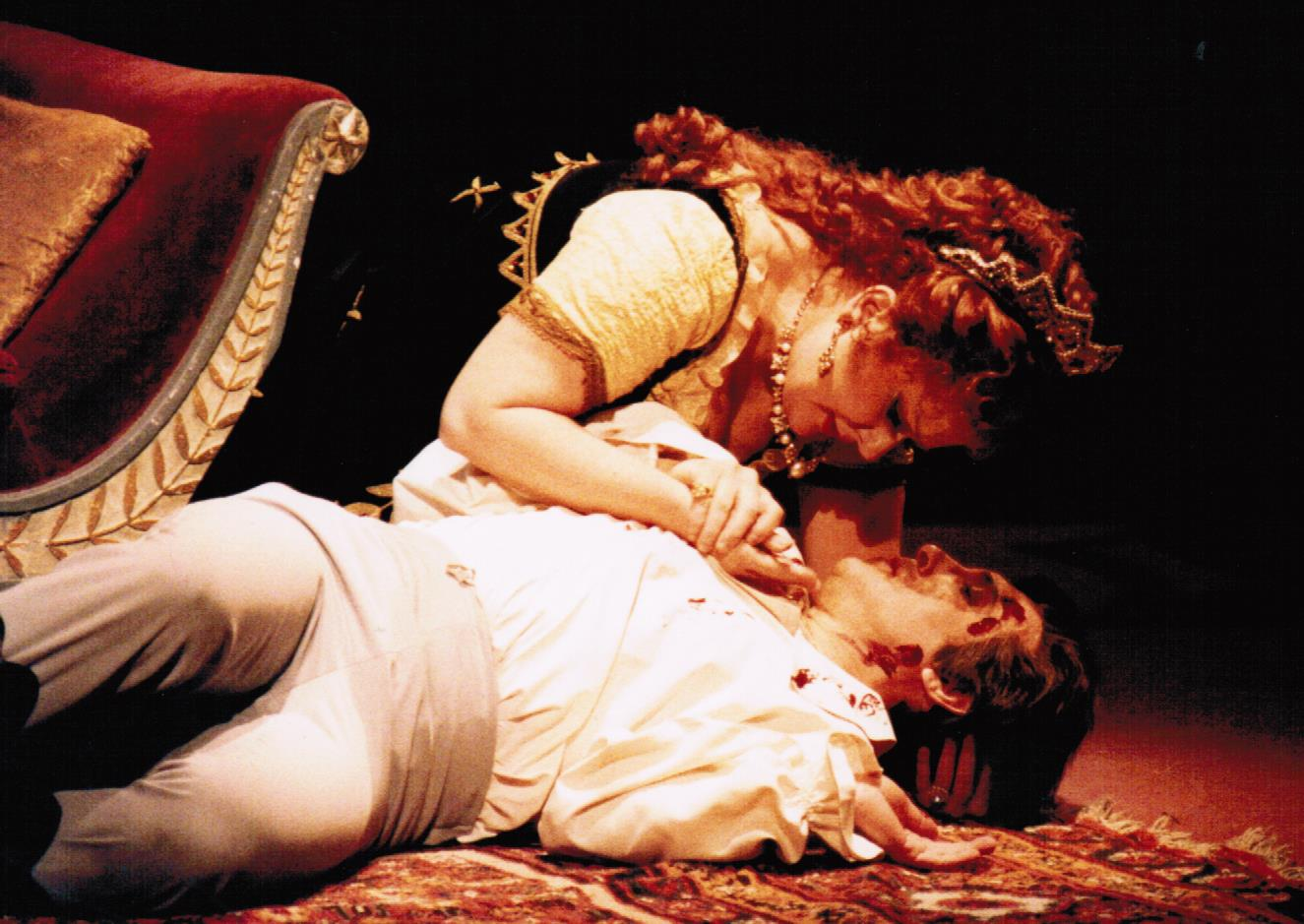
- Shicoff as Mario Cavaradossi in Tosca
- Born: Neil Shicoff; 2 June 1942; Brooklyn, New York, US
- Occupation: Operatic tenor
- Years active: 1975–2006
- Spouses: Judith Haddon (m. 1978; div. 1997); Dawn Kotoski (m. 1997)
- Children: 2
- Awards: Grammy Award for Best Opera Recording (Nominee) – La Juive; Grammy Award for Best Opera Recording (Nominee) – Attila

Neil Shicoff (born June 2, 1949) is an American opera singer and cantor and known for his lyric tenor singing and his dramatic, emotional acting.

== Beginnings ==
Neil Shicoff was born in Brooklyn, New York. He studied at the Juilliard School of Music, with his father, the hazzan Sidney Shicoff and others, including Franco Corelli in the early 1980s. He sang in small theatres in New York before music school, including a Don José in Bizet's Carmen at Amato Opera and small roles at Juilliard, and was an apprentice at the Santa Fe Opera in the summer of 1973. His professional debut as a tenor lead in a major opera house was in the title role in Verdi's Ernani, conducted by James Levine in Cincinnati in 1975.

In 1976, Shicoff made his debut at the Metropolitan Opera as Rinuccio in Gianni Schicchi conducted by Levine. Shicoff was then engaged by the Met where he appeared in Rigoletto, La Bohème, Der Rosenkavalier, and Werther, which was to become one of his signature roles. He soon sang in the major opera houses in the U.S. and Europe, winning great notices and recording some of his roles. Shicoff experienced severe stage fright well into his career, which caused him to cancel a number of performances. He was known to be a perfectionist, carefully researching and preparing each role, both dramatically and vocally.

== Rebuilding his career ==
Shicoff continued singing at the Met until 1990 when he appeared in the title role of Faust. However, in 1991 he left America, fleeing the stresses and headlines engendered by his ongoing divorce proceeding and custody battle concerning his daughter, into a self-described European exile. He lived for three years in Berlin, then Zürich, performing throughout Europe (with a handful of appearances in Buenos Aires), and he slowly rebuilt his reputation for reliability. He appeared at Vienna State Opera, La Scala, Paris Opera, Covent Garden, Berlin's Deutsche Oper, Bavarian State Opera, Zurich Opera House and numerous other opera houses and concert halls throughout Europe.

By 1997, Shicoff and Haddon finally reached a divorce settlement. Their final decree left Shicoff free to marry soprano Dawn Kotoski, with whom he had lived since 1990, and to renew his relationship with his daughter, Aliza. Shicoff also returned to the Met, as Lensky in Eugene Onegin. His last performance at the Met was in 2006 when he appeared as Rodolfo in Luisa Miller. By then he had appeared with company over 200 times in 20 roles.

Shicoff's most famous roles (besides Werther), include the title roles in The Tales of Hoffmann and Peter Grimes and Lensky in Eugene Onegin and Eleazar in La Juive, as well as for a number of the Romantic French and Italian lyric and spinto tenor roles. In addition to his opera performances, he has also sung concerts with the Israel Philharmonic conducted by Leonard Bernstein, the Berlin Philharmonic conducted by Claudio Abbado, the San Francisco Symphony conducted by Edo de Waart, and the Boston Symphony Orchestra conducted by Seiji Ozawa, among others, and at many festivals.

== Later years ==
In the 2000s, Shicoff sang the roles of Cavaradossi in Tosca and Hoffmann at La Scala and Paris’ Opéra Bastille; Des Grieux in Manon Lescaut; Don José in Carmen at the Lyric Opera of Chicago and the Zurich Opera House and Eleazar in Halévy's La Juive at La Fenice in Venice, with Wiener Staatsoper and the Zurich Opera House, Peter Grimes at the Teatro Regio in Turin. He has sung also Edgardo in Lucia di Lammermoor, the title role in Idomeneo, and Rodolfo in La bohème at the Vienna State Opera; Luisa Miller (Rodolfo) at the Met; Gabriele Adorno in Simon Boccanegra at Covent Garden and in Paris; Hermann in Tchaikovsky's The Queen of Spades; and Manrico in il Trovatore, Cavaradossi in Tosca, and Pinkerton in Madama Butterfly at the Zurich Opera House, among others.

Shicoff was a regular at the Vienna State Opera where he attained the rank of Kammersänger and was awarded honorary lifetime membership in the company. His personal friendship with the Austrian Federal Chancellor, Alfred Gusenbauer, led to wide expectation that he would follow Ioan Holender as director of the opera company in 2010. However, in a surprise decision Austrian Culture Minister Claudia Schmidt, appointed Dominique Meyer as director and Franz Welser-Möst as musical director in June 2007.

Shicoff made his debut at the Mikhailovsky Theatre of Saint Petersburg in 2010, and performed there as Éléazar in La Juive, Hermann in Queen of Spades, Captain Vere in Billy Budd and Canio in Pagliacci. In 2015 he was appointed head of opera at the Mikhailovsky, for a term of three years. During his time there he regularly held masterclasses with the theatre's young soloists. Since retiring from the stage, Shicoff has continued to work as a voice teacher with several other opera companies and conservatories as well as serving on the juries of voice competitions.

== Personal life ==
Shichoff married soprano Judith Haddon in 1978 which ended in divorce in 1997. They had one daughter, Aliza. He later married soprano Dawn Kotoski in 1997, with whom his has a son, Alexander.

== Recordings ==
- Bizet: Carmen, Philips 422 366–2, Grand Auditorium de Radio France, Paris, 13-22 Jul 1988; Opéra-Comique version; Carmen: Jessye Norman; Micaëla: Mirella Freni; Don José: Neil Shicoff; Escamillo: Simon Estes; Orchestre National de France et Choeurs de Radio France; Conductor: Seiji Ozawa
- Donizetti: Lucia di Lammermoor, Teldec 0630–13803–2, St. Augustine's Church, London, September 1991; Lord Enrico Ashton: Alexandru Agache; Lucia: Edita Gruberova; Sir Edgardo di Ravenswood: Neil Shicoff; Lord Arturo Bucklaw: Bernard Lombardo; Raimondo Bidebent: Alastair Miles; Alisa: Diana Montague; London Symphony Orchestra and the Ambrosian Singers; Conductor: Richard Bonynge
- Halévy: La Juive, RCA Red Seal 74321795962, Live Austrian Radio, October 23, 1999; Rachel: Soile Isokoski; Eléazar: Neil Shicoff; Cardinal Brogni: Alastair Miles; Eudoxie: Regina Schörg; Leopold: Zoran Todorovich; Vienna State Opera Orchestra & Chorus; Conductor: Simone Young
- Offenbach: Les Contes d'Hoffmann, EMI CDS 7 49641, Palais des Beaux-Arts, Brussels, Jun-Jul 1988; Fritz Oeser edition; Hoffmann: Neil Shicoff; Nicklausse/La Muse: Ann Murray; Olympia: Luciana Serra; Antonia: Rosalind Plowright; Giulietta: Jessye Norman; Lindorf/Coppélius/Miracle/Dapertutto: José van Dam; Symphonic Orchestra and Chorus of the Opéra National du Théâtre Royal de la Monnaie, Brussels; Conductor: Sylvain Cambreling
- Puccini: The Puccini Album: Great scenes from Tosca and Manon Lescaut, Philips 456 586–2, Teatro Comunale, Florence, Nov 1997; Floria Tosca: Galina Gorchakova; Mario Cavaradossi: Neil Shicoff; Il Sagrestano: Alessandro Calamai; Manon Lescaut: Galina Gorchakova; Renato Des Grieux: Neil Shicoff; Orchestra and Chorus of the Maggio Musicale Fiorentino; Conductor: Seiji Ozawa
- Puccini: Il tabarro, EMI CD 5 56587 2 - disc 1, Lyndhurst Hall, Air Studios, Hampstead, London, Jul 1997; Michele: Carlo Guelfi; Giorgetta: Maria Guleghina; Luigi: Neil Shicoff; London Symphony Orchestra and London Voices; Conductor: Antonio Pappano
- Tchaikovsky: Eugene Onegin, Philips 438 235–2, Paris, Oct 1992; Larina: Sarah Walker; Tatiana: Nuccia Focile; Olga: Olga Borodina; Filipyevna: Irina Arkhipova; Eugene Onegin: Dmitri Hvorostovsky; Lensky: Neil Shicoff; Prince Gremin: Alexander Anisimov; St. Petersburg Chamber Choir and Orchestre de Paris; Conductor: Semyon Bychkov
- Tchaikovsky: Eugene Onegin, Deutsche Grammophon 423959–2, Lukaskirche Dresden, Jun 1987; Larina: Rosemarie Lang; Tatiana: Mirella Freni; Olga: Anne Sofie von Otter; Filipyevna: Ruthild Engert-Ely; Eugene Onegin: Thomas Allen; Lensky: Neil Shicoff; Prince Gremin: Paata Burchuladze; Staatskapelle Dresden and Rundfunkchor Leipzig; Conductor: James Levine
- Verdi: Aroldo, Philips 462 512–2; Aroldo: Neil Shicoff; Mina: Carol Vaness; Egberto: Anthony Michaels-Moore; Briano: Roberto Scandiuzzi; Orchestra and Chorus of the Maggio Musicale Fiorentino; Conductor: Fabio Luisi
- Verdi: Attila, EMI CDS749952-2, Albanella, Milan, Jun-Jul 1989; Attila: Samuel Ramey; Odabella: Cheryl Studer; Foresto: Neil Shicoff; Ezio: Giorgio Zancanaro; Orchestra and Chorus of Teatro alla Scala; Conductor: Riccardo Muti
- Verdi: Macbeth, Philips 412 133–2, Berlin, Nov-Dec 1983; Lady Macbeth: Mara Zampieri; Macbeth: Renato Bruson; Banco: Robert Lloyd; Dama: Lucia Aliberti; Macduff: Neil Shicoff; Chorus and Orchestra of the Deutsche Oper Berlin; Conductor: Giuseppe Sinopoli
- Verdi: Rigoletto, Philips 412 592-2 -or- 462 158–2, Rome, Sep 1984; Il Duca di Mantova: Neil Shicoff; Rigoletto: Renato Bruson; Gilda: Edita Gruberová; Sparafucile: Robert Lloyd; Maddalena: Brigitte Fassbaender; Chorus and Orchestra of the Accademia Nazionale di Santa Cecilia; Conductor: Giuseppe Sinopoli
- Verdi: La traviata, Teldec 9031–76348–2, Abbey Road Studios, London, Feb 1992; Violetta Valéry: Edita Gruberová; Flora Bervoix: Patricia Spence; Annina: Monica Bacelli; Alfredo Germont: Neil Shicoff; Giorgio Germont: Giorgio Zancanaro; London Symphony Orchestra and the Ambrosian Singers; Conductor: Carlo Rizzi

== Videography ==
- Offenbach: Les Contes d'Hoffmann, Metropolitan Opera Video; Metropolitan Opera, 8 Jan 1988 | Telecast: 2 Mar 1988; Olympia: Gwendolyn Bradley; Antonia: Roberta Alexander; Giulietta: Tatiana Troyanos; Nicklausse/La Muse: Susan Quittmeyer; Hoffmann: Neil Shicoff; Lindorf/Coppélius/Miracle/Dapertutto: James Morris; Metropolitan Opera Orchestra and Chorus; Conductor: Charles Dutoit
- Puccini: La Bohème, National Video Corporation 4509-99222-3 -or- Castle Vision CVI 2014; Royal Opera House, Covent Garden, 1982; Mimì: Ileana Cotrubas; Rodolfo: Neil Shicoff; Marcello: Thomas Allen; Musetta: Marilyn Zschau; Orchestra of the Royal Opera House and Royal Opera Chorus; Conductor: Lamberto Gardelli
- Verdi: La traviata, National Video Corporation 4509-92409-3/Teldec Video; Gran Teatro La Fenice, Venice, Dec 1992; Violetta Valéry: Edita Gruberova; Flora Bervoix: Mariana Pentcheva; Annina: Antonella Trevisan; Alfredo Germont: Neil Shicoff; Giorgio Germont: Giorgio Zancanaro; Orchestra and Chorus of the Teatro La Fenice; Conductor: Carlo Rizzi
- Halévy: La juive, Deutsche Grammophon DVD 00440 073 4001; Vienna State Opera 15 May 2003; Neil Shicoff (Eléazar), Krassimira Stoyanova (Rachel), Simina Ivan (Euxodie), Jianyi Zhang (Léopold), Walter Fink (Cardinal Brogni) - Chor und Orchester der Wiener Staatsoper, cond. Vjekoslav Šutej

== Decorations and awards ==
- 2003: Austrian Cross of Honour for Science and Art, 1st class
- 2006: Gold Medal for Services to the City of Vienna
- Chevalier of the Ordre des Arts et des Lettres (France)
- April 2011: Golden Mask as "Best Male Opera Performer" for his performance as Éléazar in La Juive at the Mikhailovsky Theatre
