= Wedding anthem for Princess Anne =

Anthem by George Frideric Handel

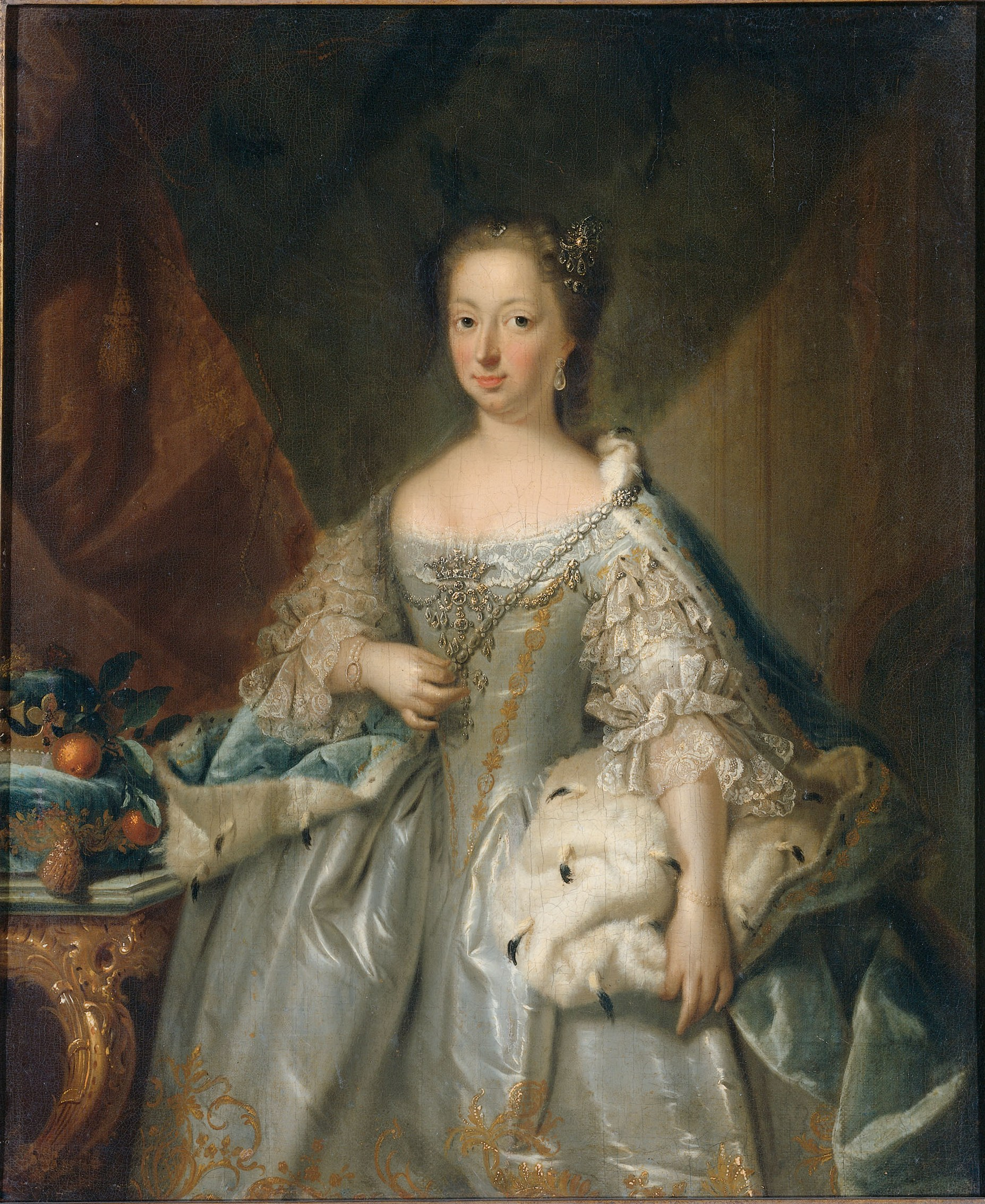
Anne, Princess Royal

The Wedding anthem for Princess Anne, HWV 262, This is the day which the Lord hath made, is an anthem for vocal soloists, chorus and orchestra by George Frideric Handel. It was written for the wedding of Anne, Princess Royal and Prince William of Orange and was first performed during their marriage at the French Chapel in St James's Palace, London, on 14 March 1734. The music is set to English texts chosen from the biblical books of Psalms, Proverbs and Sirach (Ecclesiasticus).

== Background ==
The German-born Handel had been resident in London since 1712 and had there achieved great success as a composer of Italian operas. He had also enjoyed the patronage of monarchs Queen Anne, George I and George II and other members of the royal family and had been commissioned by them to compose numerous pieces of music for worship services in the royal chapels as well as for other royal occasions. Handel enjoyed a particularly warm and close relationship with Anne, Princess Royal, eldest daughter of George II, who supported his opera seasons, was an accomplished musician herself, and to whom Handel even gave private lessons - although he did not enjoy teaching, he made an exception in her case. The evening before the wedding, the princess, the rest of the royal family and all their court attended the first performance of a full length operatic entertainment,"Parnasso in Festa", specially composed by Handel for the occasion at the King's Theatre in the Haymarket where he was presenting his seasons of Italian operas, and with the same star opera singers who were appearing in his current successful opera. "Arianna in Creta".

The princess had herself chosen the biblical texts which Handel set to music in the anthem. It is a festive piece with double choruses, i.e., the choral writing is for eight parts rather than the usual four. During the wedding service, while the performance of Handel's anthem was taking place there were no processions or ceremonies or other activities happening; the order of service indicated this was the only time the princess and her bridegroom sat in the chairs provided for them. They and everyone else present gave Handel's music their full attention.
