= Dawn Kotoski =

American operatic soprano (born 1966)

Dawn Kotoski (born 1966) is an American operatic soprano who has a substantial international opera career. She began her career at the Metropolitan Opera in New York City during the late 1980s singing lighter lyric soprano and soubrette roles. She joined the Vienna State Opera for the 1993–1994 season and since then her career has been centered mostly in Europe. She is married to tenor Neil Shicoff.

== Biography ==
Born in Baltimore, Maryland, Kotoski studied at the Manhattan School of Music and then entered the Young Artist Program at the Metropolitan Opera. She made her professional opera debut at the Met as Poussette in Jules Massenet's Manon on 22 September 1987 with Catherine Malfitano in the title role. She sang several more roles at the Met over the next couple years including Giannetta in Gaetano Donizetti's L'elisir d'amore with Dawn Upshaw, Ruth Ann Swenson, and Kathleen Battle alternating as Adina (1988–1989), the Dew Fairy in Humperdinck's Hänsel und Gretel (1988–1989), and one of the unborn children in Richard Strauss's Die Frau ohne Schatten. In 1988 she sang the title role in Handel's Partenope with Opera Omaha and in 1989 she sang the role of Sophie in Massenet's Werther with the Opera Theatre of Saint Louis.

In 1990 she sang the role of Walter in Alfredo Catalani's La Wally with the Opera Orchestra of New York. That same year she won the Young Concert Artists International Auditions which led to her New York City recital debut at the 92nd Street Y on 13 November 1990 accompanied by pianist Warren Jones and flautist Eugenia Zukerman. She repeated the recital the following March at the Kennedy Center in Washington, D.C. As a winner of YCA, she gave further recitals throughout the United States. In 1991 Kotoski made her debut with the Lyric Opera of Chicago as Papagena in Wolfgang Amadeus Mozart's The Magic Flute, her debut with Calgary Opera as Sussana in Mozart's Le nozze di Figaro, and she sang the soprano solos in Mozart's Mass in C minor at the Mostly Mozart Festival. That same year she won Orchestra New England's soloist prize and she made her debut with the Canadian Opera Company as Marzelline in Beethoven's Fidelio. In 1992 she sang the role of Barbarina in a concert version of Mozart's Le nozze di Figaro with the Chicago Symphony Orchestra under the baton of Daniel Barenboim and she sang the role of Galatea in Handel's Acis and Galatea with the Seattle Symphony Orchestra and Chorus under conductor Gerard Schwarz.

In 1993 Kotoski sang the soprano solo in Gustav Mahler's Symphony No. 4 with the Baltimore Symphony Orchestra at Carnegie Hall. By this time Kotoski was already living with her future husband, operatic tenor Neil Shicoff, and she gave birth to their son Alexander in December 1992. The couple eventually married in the spring of 1997. That same year she joined the Vienna State Opera where she sang for the 1993–1994 season in such roles as Pamina in The Magic Flute, Oscar in Giuseppe Verdi's Un ballo in maschera, and Musetta in Giacomo Puccini's La bohème. During this time she also sang the role of Gilda in Verdi's Rigoletto with the Opéra national du Rhin in Strasbourg, the role of Oscar at the Opéra Bastille in Paris and Servilia in "La clemenza di Tito" with Teatro Real in Madrid.

In 1994 Kotoski joined the roster at Zurich Opera where she sang in many roles through 2000, including Pamina, Sophie, Gilda, Juliette, Musetta, Lisabetta in Umberto Giordano's La cena delle beffe, and Adele in Die Fledermaus. In 1997 Kotoski sang the role of Zdenka in Richard Strauss's Arabella with Santa Fe Opera. In 1998 she sang Musetta at the Bavarian State Opera, Jemmy in Gioachino Rossini's William Tell at the Vienna State Opera, and Lisa in a concert version of Vincenzo Bellini's La sonnambula in Munich opposite Edita Gruberova as Amina. In 2000 she sang Zdenka opposite Cheryl Studer's Arabella at Opera Zurich.

After a 14-year professional career, Kotoski retired from the operatic stage in 2001 to concentrate on her family.

== Discography ==
=== Complete operas ===
Year	Title	Role	Cast	Conductor Orchestra	Live / Studio	Label
1992	Handel: Acis And Galatea	Galatea	Dawn Kotoski, David Gordon, Glenn Siebert, Jan Opalach	Gerard Schwarz; Seattle Symphony Orchestra and Chorus	Live	Delos
1994	Handel: Giustino	Anastasio	Dawn Kotoski, Dorothea Röschmann, Michael Chance, Jennifer Lane, Mark Padmore, Drew Minter, Dean Ely, Juliana Gondek	Nicholas McGegan; Freiburger Barockorchester	studio	Harmonia Mundi France
1998	Bellini: La sonnambula	Lisa	Edita Gruberova, José Bros, Tim Hennis, Roberto Scandiuzzi, Dawn Kotoski, Gloria Banditelli, Andreas Mogl	Marcello Viotti; Munich Radio Symphony Orchestra and Chorus	Live	Nightingale Classics
1998	Rossini: Guillaume Tell	Jemmy	John Dickie, Wotjek Smilek, Nancy Gustafson, Giuseppe Sabbatini, Walter Fink, Dawn Kotoski, Egils Silins, Mathias Zachariassen, Mihaela Ungureanu, Mihaela Ungureanu, Yu Chen, Johannes Gisser, Thomas Hampson	Fabio Luisi; Vienna State Opera Orchestra and Chorus	Studio	Orfeo
1999	Massenet: Werther	Sophie	Ramón Vargas, Vesselina Kasarova, Dawn Kotoski, Roman Trekel, Christoph Genz, Umberto Chiummo, Christopher Schaldenbrand, Arndis Halla, Frank Baer	Vladimir Jurowski; Deutsches Symphonie-Orchester Berlin	Studio	RCA
