= Licenza (musical term) =

A licenza (Italian for 'licence') aria or finale is a passage in an opera written in the 18th century or earlier in which the royal patron such as a king or queen or prince who was in the audience was celebrated onstage by the singers. Called a "licence" passage because the composer and librettist had freedom to drop any pretence of characters playing roles onstage and openly sing the praises of the royal personages in attendance at the theatre, licenza passages occur in operas such as Gluck's Orfeo ed Euridice and Handel's Atalanta, among others, written to celebrate royal festive occasions.
