= Atalanta (opera) =

Opera by Georg Friedrich Händel

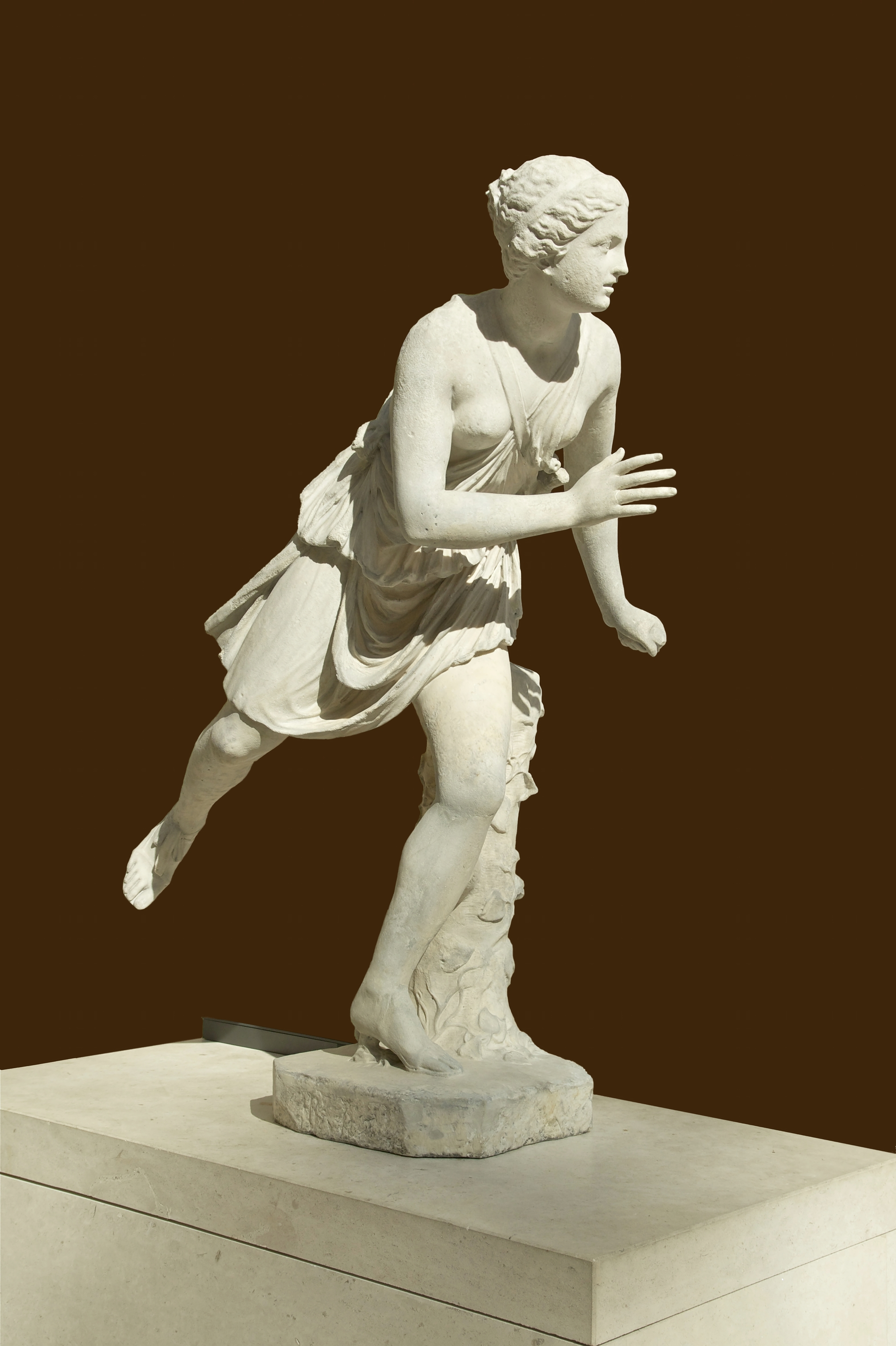
Atalanta

Atalanta (HWV 35) is a pastoral opera in three acts by George Frideric Handel composed in 1736. It is based upon the mythological female athlete, Atalanta, the libretto (which is in Italian) being derived from the book La Caccia in Etolia by Belisario Valeriani. The identity of the librettist is not known.

Handel composed it for the London celebrations of the marriage in 1736 of Frederick, Prince of Wales, eldest son of King George II, to Princess Augusta of Saxe-Gotha. The first performance took place on 12 May 1736 in the Covent Garden Theatre. It closed with a spectacular display of fireworks, which was highly popular with the royal family and the London audience, and the opera and fireworks display were revived a number of times in the year of its first performance.

An arioso from the opera, "Care selve", is often heard in recital and on recordings.

== Background ==
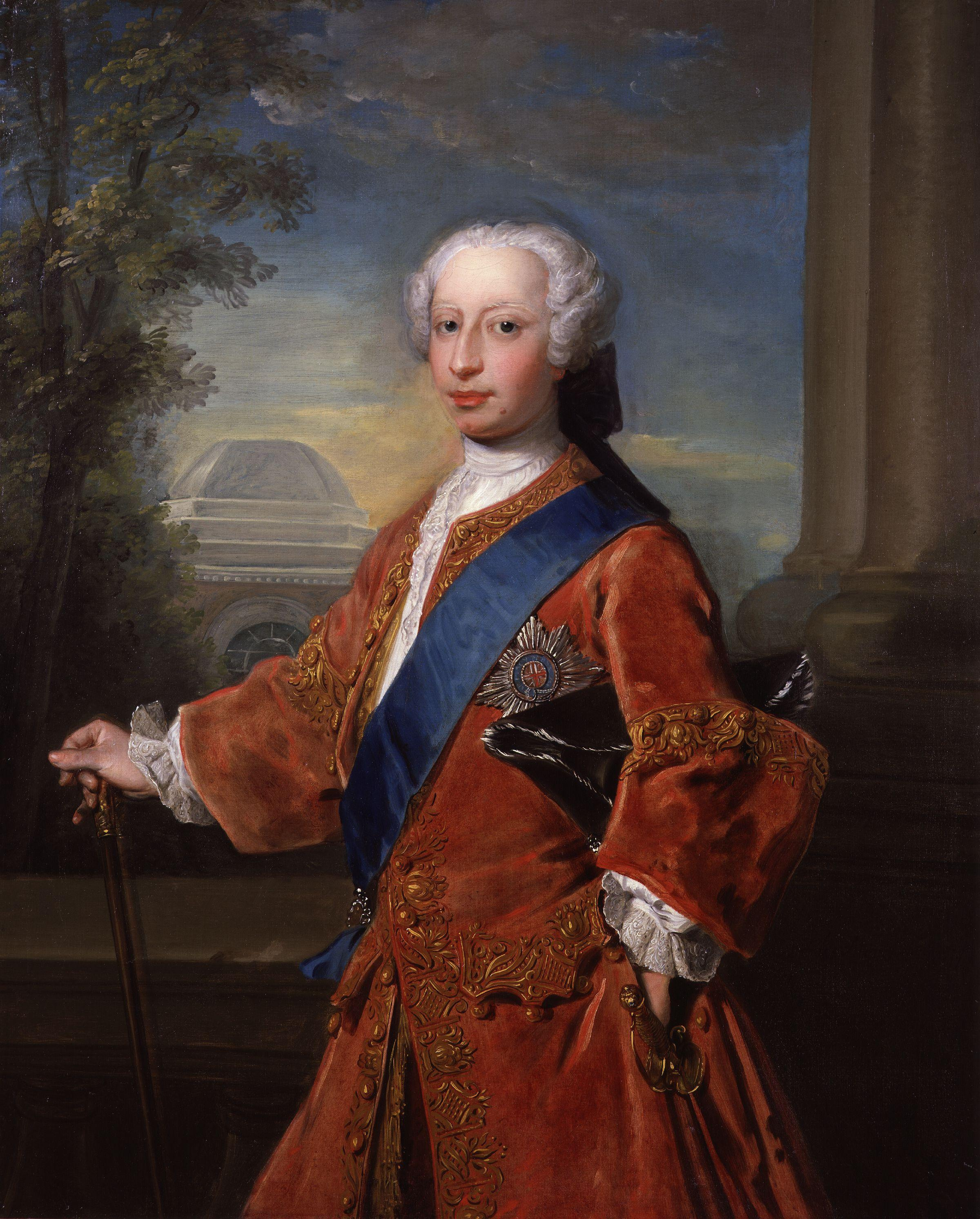
Frederick, Prince of Wales by Philip Mercier

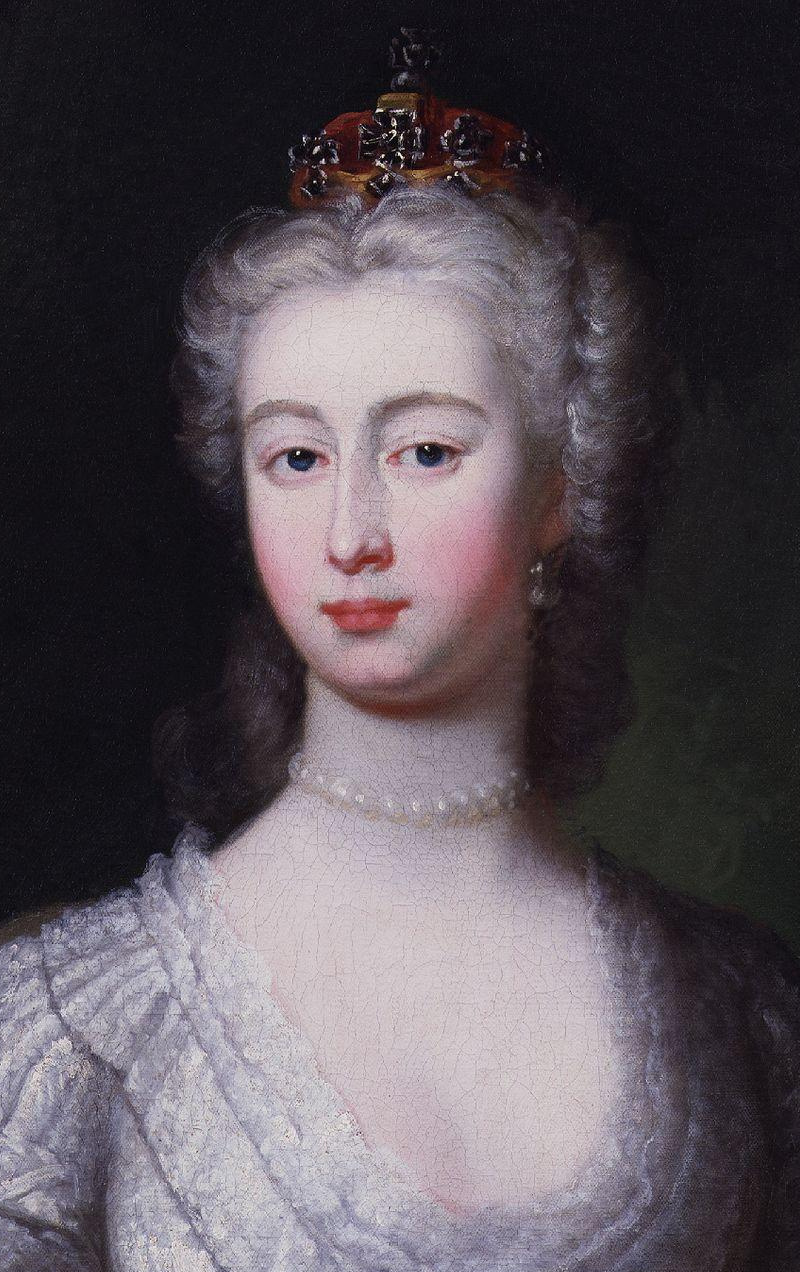
Augusta of Saxe-Gotha, Princess of Wales by Charles Philips

The German-born Handel had brought Italian opera to London stages for the first time in 1711 with his opera Rinaldo. An enormous success, Rinaldo created a craze in London for Italian opera seria, a form focused overwhelmingly on solo arias for the star virtuoso singers. Handel had presented new operas in London for years with great success. One of the major attractions in Handel's operas was the star castrato Senesino whose relationship with the composer was often stormy and who eventually left Handel's company to appear with the rival Opera of the Nobility, set up in 1733 and with the Prince of Wales as a major sponsor. Handel moved to another theatre, Covent Garden, and engaged different singers, but there was not enough of an audience for opera in London, or aristocratic supporters to back it, for two opera houses at once, and both opera companies found themselves in difficulty.

Handel's spring season of 1736 was shorter than usual, probably because of these difficulties, but when the wedding of the Prince of Wales was announced he prepared an opera in celebration. His rival Nicola Porpora did the same, writing the serenata La festa d'Imeneo. Neither work was ready for performance by the day of the wedding itself, 27 April 1736, and Porpora's work premiered on 4 May. The premiere of Atalanta on 12 May was attended by the King and Queen but not by their son the Prince of Wales and his new wife.

Atalanta was a more light-hearted and celebratory work than many of his other opera seria, along the same lines as his very popular piece Il Pastor Fido which he had recently revived. The celebrations for the royal marriage at the end of the piece with an onstage fireworks display created a sensation. Poet Thomas Gray wrote to Horace Walpole:

...(in) the last act...there appears the Temple of Hymen with illuminations; there is a row of blue fires burning in order along the ascent to the temple; a fountain of fire spouts up out of the ground to the ceiling, and two more cross each other obliquely from the sides of the stage; on the top is a wheel that whirls always about, and throws out a shower of gold-colour, silver, and blue fiery rain.

== Roles ==
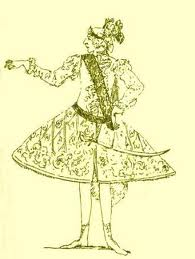
Caricature of Gizziello, creator of the role of Meleagro

Roles, voice types, and premiere cast
Role	Voice type	Premiere Cast, 12 May 1736
Atalanta	soprano	Anna Maria Strada del Pò
Meleagro	soprano castrato	Gioacchino Conti, called Gizziello
Irene	contralto	Maria Caterina Negri
Aminta	tenor	John Beard
Nicandro	bass	Gustavus Waltz
Mercurio (Mercury), the messenger god	bass	Henry Theodore Reinhold

== Synopsis ==
Loosely based on the mythological story of Atalanta, the opera is set in legendary times of ancient Greece.

=== Act 1 ===
King Meleagro of Aetolia has disguised himself as a shepherd, taking the pseudonym Tirsi, and is enjoying his life in the countryside away from the cares of state. He is very much in love with the huntress "Amarilli", whom he does not realise is the Princess Atalanta. He meets up with Aminta, a real shepherd, who is desperately in love with the shepherdess Irene, who however when she appears, does nothing but pour scorn on Aminta. He declares he is ready to die for his love but will always be faithful to her.

Nicandro, Irene's father and Meleagro's friend, tells Meleagro that Irene really loves Aminta too but she wants to be sure that he will be true to her.

Princess Atalanta of Arcadia now comes on to the scene. She too has taken another name, Amarilli, and has retreated to the country disguised as a huntress. Everyone prepares to go hunting, but Atalanta will not permit Meleagro to remain by her side during the hunt, although she is really in love with him. When a wild boar comes running out of the woods, Aminta tries to throw himself into its path, so distraught is he by Irene's seeming rejection, but the others prevent him. Atalanta kills the boar and rejoices in her triumph.

=== Act 2 ===
Everyone is celebrating Atalanta's triumph in killing the wild boar, but she herself is feeling sad because she is in love with "Tirsi". However she, a princess in disguise, cannot marry the simple shepherd "Tirsi", who she does not realise is really King Meleagro, in disguise himself. Meleagro overhears her musing on this unfortunate state of affairs and tries to make his identity known to her but he is painfully shy and so is she and so they do not manage to clear things up. Irene pretends to be in love with Meleagro, but she is only trying to torment Aminta further. Meleagro gives Irene a ribbon and asks her to give it to Atalanta and tell her how much he loves her.

Irene flaunts the ribbon Meleagro has given her to Aminta, pretending that she is really in love with Meleagro. Aminta protests against her cruelty. Atalanta gives Aminta an arrow which she asks him to present to Meleagro without mentioning her name. Meleagro knows she is really in love with him and is quite cheerful, but Atalanta feels that her duty will prevent her from ever confessing her love for him.

=== Act 3 ===
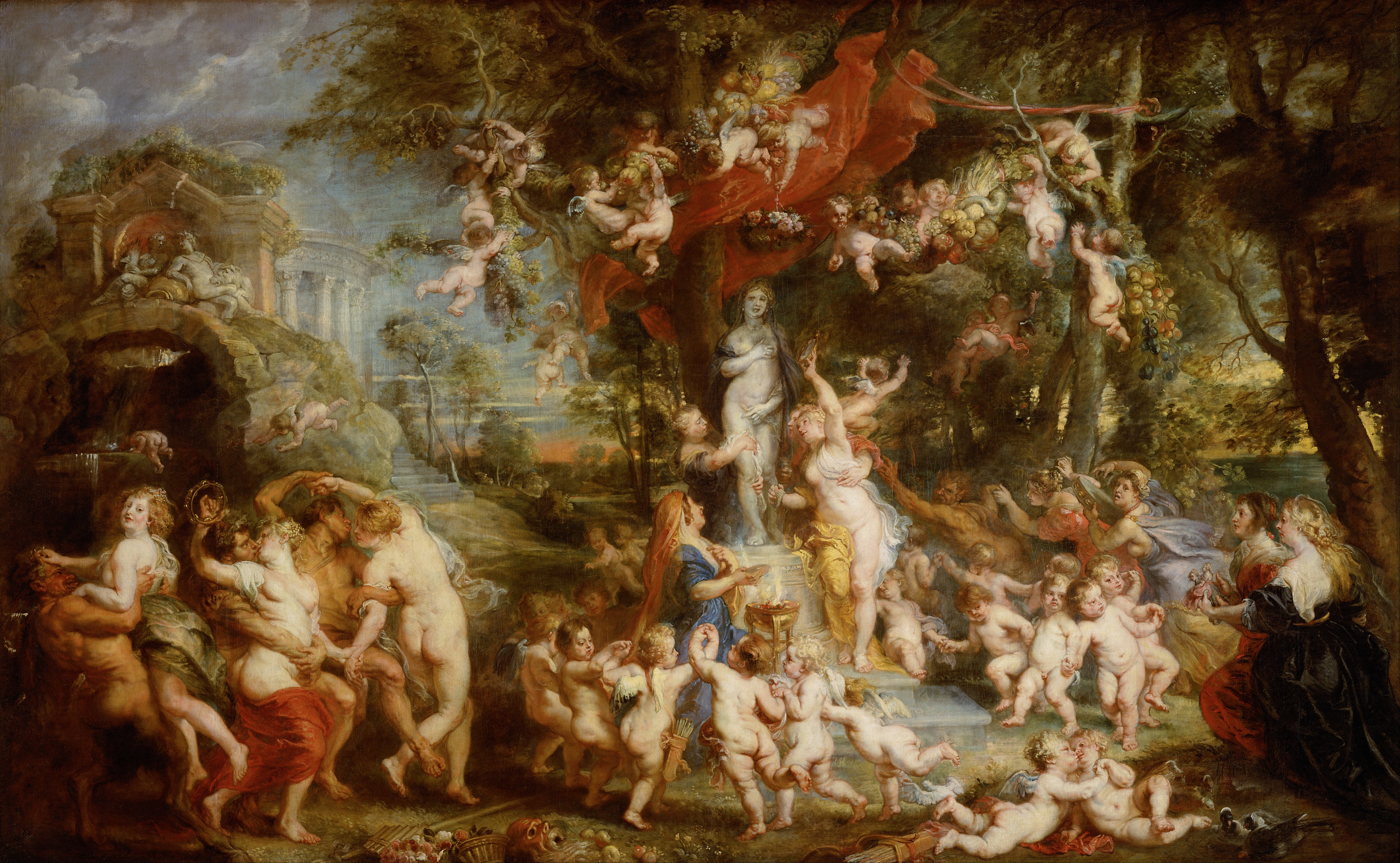
Peter Paul Rubens - The Feast of Venus

Irene presents Atalanta with the ribbon Meleagro gave her. Atalanta is touched and sends word to Meleagro that he can learn all about her through Aminta.

Irene then encounters Aminta, who decides to give her some of her own medicine by flaunting the arrow Atalanta gave to him to give to Meleagro. Aminta says Atalanta gave the arrow to him because she is madly in love with him and he loves her too. Irene is furious and Meleagro, who has been watching and listening to this unobserved, is in despair. Irene confesses she has been in love with Aminta all along; Meleagro, left by himself and exhausted from all this emotional turmoil, falls asleep.

Atalanta enters, pondering over the strange coincidence that the ribbon sent to her by the shepherd "Tirsi" looks like the ribbon belonging to King Meleagro. Meleagro wakes up and Atalanta can restrain herself no more; she admits she loves him and they embrace.

Nicandro, Irene and Aminta enter; Irene and Aminta have sorted everything out and admit they love each other. Nicandro tells the shepherd "Tirsi" that the huntress "Amarilli" is really Princess Atalanta and Atalanta that "Tirsi" is really King Meleagro. There is now nothing to stop their marriage and both couples are joyous.

The heavens part and Mercury, messenger from Jove himself, descends on a cloud surrounded by cupids and the Graces. Mercury brings Jove's blessings on the royal couple, assuring them of personal happiness and the love of their people. The work ends with general rejoicing, celebrations, and a display of fireworks.

== Musical features ==
The work begins with a festive overture with parts for two trumpets, which do not have music to play again until the licenza finale. A "licenza" or "licence" aria or finale in an opera was one in which the singers dropped character to praise the royal personages present in the audience, a feature of various operas including Gluck's Orfeo ed Euridice. Despite the generally light-hearted and celebratory nature of the piece, Handel's music also explores the darker moments of the various characters' emotional turmoil.

The opera is scored for two oboes, bassoon, two horns, three trumpets, timpani, strings and continuo (cello, lute, harpsichord).

== Reception and performance history ==
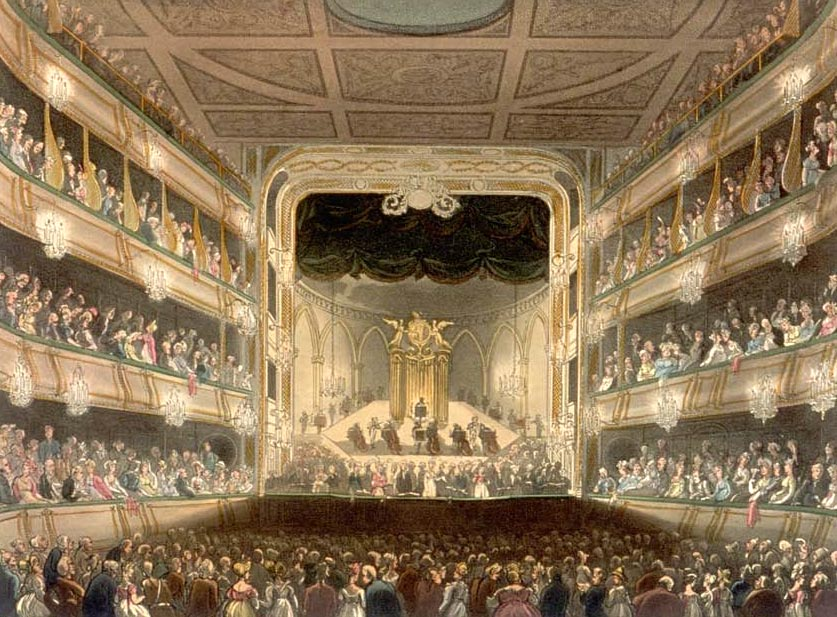
Interior, Theatre Royal Covent Garden where Atalanta was first performed

Atalanta was well received at its premiere and was performed seven more times that season. In the new season that autumn, it was revived "by Command of their Royal Highnesses the Prince and Princess of Wales" in celebration of whose wedding the work had been written, and who finally came to see it. Friend of Handel Thomas Harris wrote in a letter to a patron of Handel's, Lord Shaftesbury, that the royal couple had really come mainly to see the fireworks, which were not as spectacular as they had been in the first run of performances, saying that Atalanta:

was performed to-night in order to give their royal Highnesses a view of ye Fire-works which went off with great Applause, tho' I don't think with that Splendour I have seen them formerly.

The musical score of Atalanta, sold by subscription, was the most successful printed edition in terms of numbers of copies sold of any of Handel's works in his lifetime.

Written as a piece d'occasion to celebrate a royal wedding, Atalanta was not performed again in its entirety after the revival in November 1736 until 1970 in London, though an arioso from the work, "Care selve", became popular out of context of the piece and is often sung in recitals and on recordings. With the increased interest since the 1960s in Baroque music and historically informed musical performance, the entire opera is now performed more often. Among other performances, Atalanta was performed at the London Handel Festival in 2008, by Cambridge Handel Opera in 2013. and by the Caramoor festival, USA, in 2018.

== Recordings ==
- Katalin Farkas , soprano, Éva Bártfal-Barta, soprano, Éva Lax, contralto, János Bándi, tenor, Jószef Gregor, bass, László Polgár, bass; Savaria Coral Ensemble, Capella Savaria; Nicholas McGegan, conductor; recorded 1984 (first recording), label: Hungaroton
- Dominique Labelle, soprano, Susanne Rydén, soprano, Cecile van de Sant, mezzo-soprano, Michael Slattery, tenor, Philip Cutlip, baritone, Corey McKern, baritone; Philharmonia Chorale, Philharmonia Baroque Orchestra; Nicholas McGegan, conductor; recorded 2005, label: Philharmonia Baroque Productions
