= Carlo Scalzi =

Italian opera singer

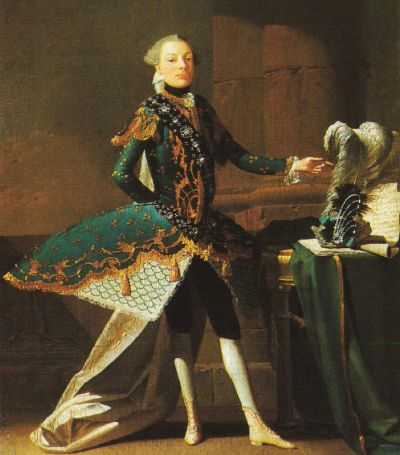
Portrait of Carlo Scalzi by Joseph Flipart, c. 1737

Carlo Scalzi (c. 1700–c. 1767–68) was an Italian castrato who had an active performance career in major opera houses in Italy from 1718 to 1738. He was also heard in London in 1733–1734 where he notably created the role of Alceste in the world premiere of George Frideric Handel's Arianna in Creta. The librettist Pietro Metastasio described Scalzi as a "very unique singer" and likened his voice to that of the famous castrato Farinelli.

== Life and career ==
Nothing is known of Scalzi's early life and the exact year of his birth is unknown. The first definite account of the singer was in 1718–1719 for a series of performances in operas by Alessandro Scarlatti in Rome. From 1719 to 1722 he was heard in Venice in operas by Giuseppe Maria Orlandini, Carlo Francesco Pollarolo, and Giovanni Porta. He also performed in Reggio Emilia and Modena in 1720.

In 1722 Scalzi was once again heard in Rome and in 1722–1723 he performed in Genoa. He then sang in Florence (1723 and 1729), Milan (1724), Venice (1724–1725), and Parma (1725). He had great success in Naples in 1726–1727 and 1730 in the operas of Johann Adolf Hasse, Nicola Porpora, and Leonardo Vinci. He created roles in two world premieres at the Teatro San Bartolomeo in 1726: Sesostrate in Hasse's Miride e Damari on 13 May 1726 and Ricimero in Vinci's L'Ernelinda on 4 November 1726. In 1728–1729 and 1731–1732 he was again in Rome where he performed in the premieres of Vinci's La Semiramide riconosciuta (6 February 1729, role of Mirteo) and Vinci's Artaserse (4 February 1730, role of Megacle). In 1733 he returned to Genoa for performances.

In 1733–1734 Scalzi was committed to George Frideric Handel's opera company at the King's Theatre in London. Handel changed and extended arias from some of his previous operas for Scalzi: including for revivals of Ottone (November 1733, Adalberto), Sosarme (April 1734, Argone), Acis and Galatea (May 1734, Dorindo), and Il pastor fido (May 1734, Silvio). On 26 January 1734 he created the role of Alceste in the world premiere of George Frideric Handel's Arianna in Creta. On 13 March 1734 he sang the role of Orpheus in the premiere of Handel's masque Parnasso in festa for the wedding of Princess Anne and William IV, Prince of Orange. While Handel greatly admired Scalzi's talents, the English public did not respond to Scalzi with the same enthusiasm that he enjoyed in Italy.

In 1734 Scalzi returned to Italy. His last known performances were in operas by Hasse and Porpora in Venice in 1737–1738. He faded into relative obscurity for a time thereafter, and retiring from the stage. The Italian National Biographic Dictionary gives the following information for Carlo Scalzi's later life: "In the years following his retirement, and certainly until 1759, Scalzi lived in seclusion in Genoa, residing at the Oratory Brotherhood in Via Lomellini, where he held organizational responsibilities for the "nightly musical oratorios" (Genoa, Archive of the Brotherhood of the Oratory of St. Philip, Accounting Register MDCCLIII). These years coincided with a period of great musical activity at the Oratory. Also in Genoa, between 1744 and 1746 and again between 1749 and 1759, Scalzi participated as a singer in the annual Corpus Domini procession, in accordance with a 1721 decree of the Genoese Senate that obliged "all music professors and singers" and "any instrumentalists suitable for music" to participate annually. He probably died in Genoa between the end of 1767 and the beginning of 1768. A requiem mass was celebrated for him on March 2, 1768, in the church of San Giovanni in Monte in Bologna, a custom reserved for members of the Philharmonic Academy (Bologna, Museum of Music, M.428)." This information and translation are courtesy of Giuseppe Gullo, a researcher and scholar of the castrati.
