= Gustavus Waltz =

18th-century German opera singer

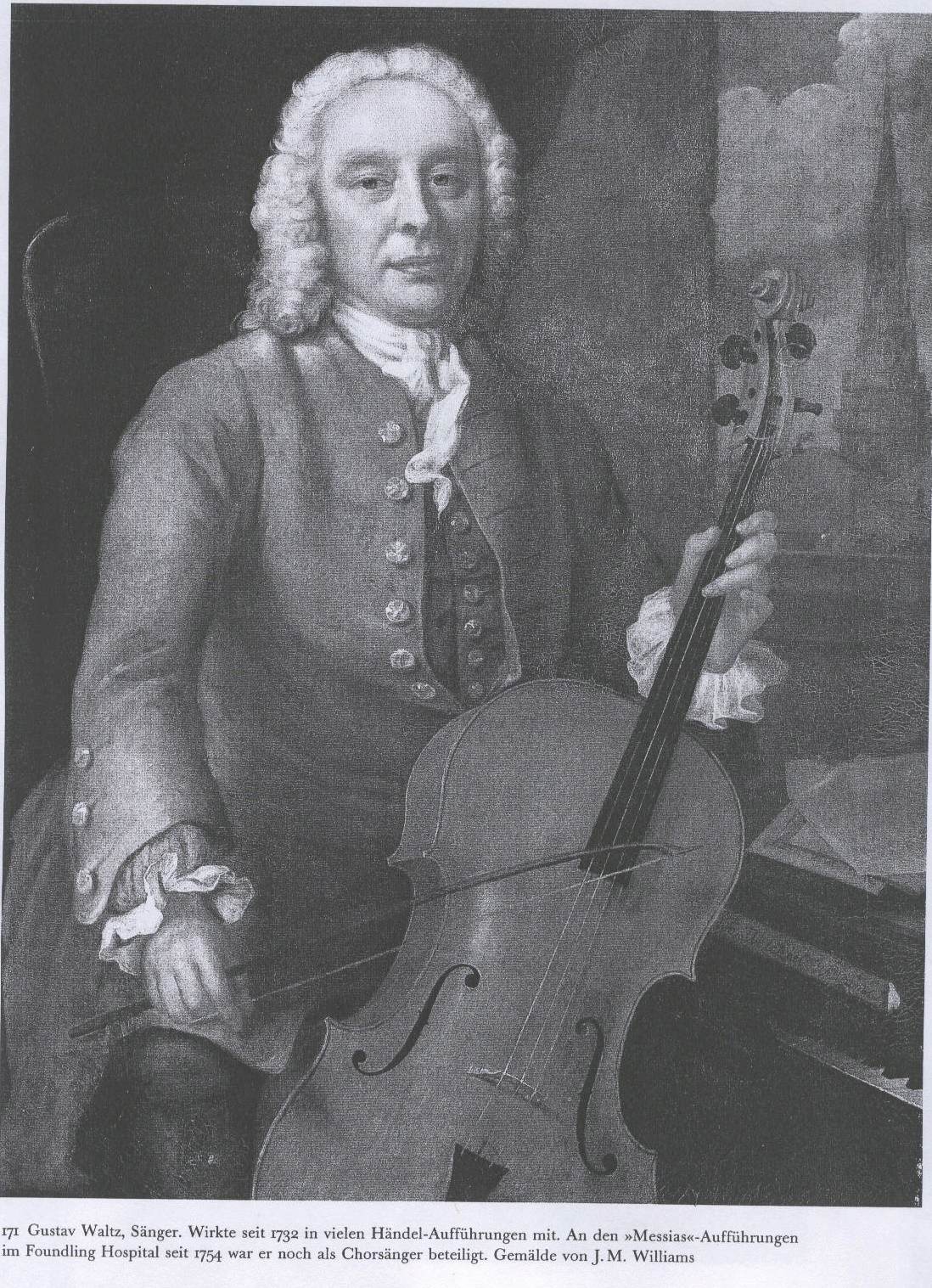
Gustavus Waltz with a cello

Gustavus Waltz (fl. 1732–1759) was a German bass opera singer. Basing himself in England from 1732, he collaborated with Handel from 1733 when he appeared in La Semiramide riconosciuta, an opera pasticcio. Like Handel, Waltz took British nationality.

Waltz created roles in the oratorio Athalia (1733); and in the operas Arianna in Creta (1734), Ariodante (1735), Alcina (1735), and Atalanta (1736). As well as being a soloist, he sang in the chorus (for the last time in a 1754 performance of Messiah at the Foundling Hospital). He also taught singing: his students included Isabella Young.

== Waltz as a cook ==
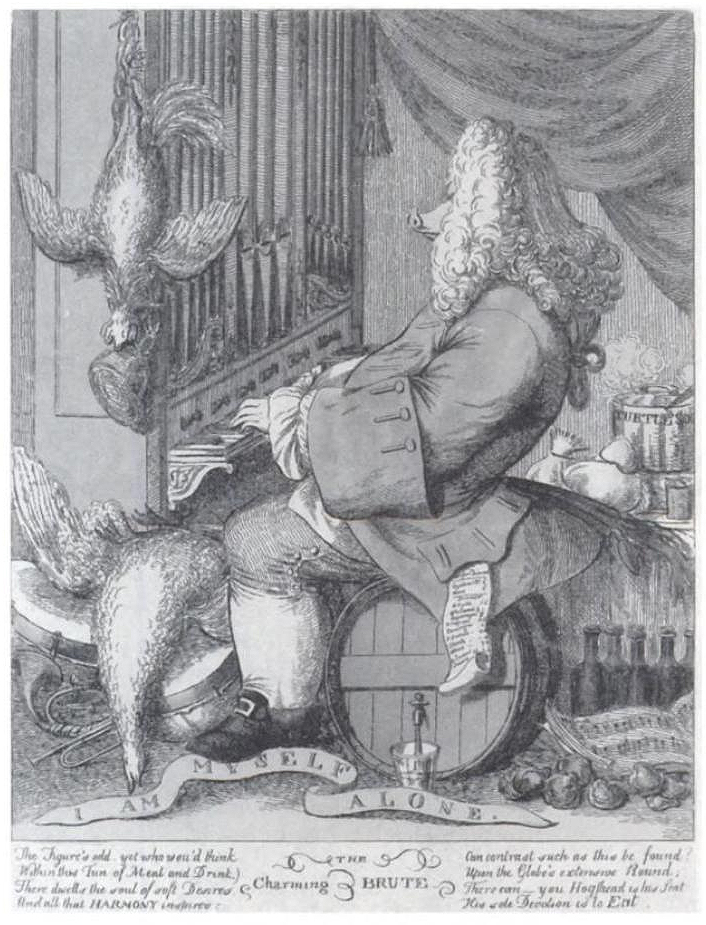
Handel depicted as a glutton by Joseph Goupy. It has been said of Handel that he clearly appreciated a good table.

Some sources state that in addition to his musical activities, he worked for Handel as a cook, perhaps before gaining recognition as a singer. This employment would presumably have been at Brook Street where Handel lived from the 1720s until his death.

There is an anecdote about Handel's opinion of a fellow composer, his younger contemporary Gluck, which refers to Waltz as a cook. Charles Burney reports Handel as saying that "he (Gluck) knows no more of contrapunto, as my cook, Waltz." Given that Waltz was an excellent singer who performed in many of Handel's works, the remark would have been less of a put down than it might appear. A choral singer as well as a soloist, he would have had some knowledge of counterpoint..
