= Giuseppe Maria Nelvi =

Italian composer

Giuseppe Maria Nelvi (1698–1756) was an Italian composer of sacred music, opera, and oratorio.

He was born in Bologna, where he also received his musical education, studying under Angelo Bertalotti, Floriano Aresti, Giovanni Antonio Ricieri, and Angelo Predieri. In 1718, at the age of 20, he was appointed maestro di cappella at the Confraternity of Santa Maria della Morte and in 1722, he became a member of the Accademia Filarmonica di Bologna. In 1727, he went to Ukraine to serve as the music director for General Stanisław Mateusz Rzewuski, a post previously held by Giovanni Antonio Ricieri. He returned to Italy in 1730, where he remained for a year before going to Germany. There, he worked in Frankfurt and Hamburg and was the composer to the Thurn und Taxis court in Regensburg, a post which he held until 1734. On his return to Bologna, he was made a "Principe" (Prince) of the Accademia Filarmonica. From 1738 until his death, he was maestro di cappella of the Cathedral of Orvieto.
