= Erasmus Engert =

Austrian painter and restorer (1796–1871)

Erasmus Ritter von Engert
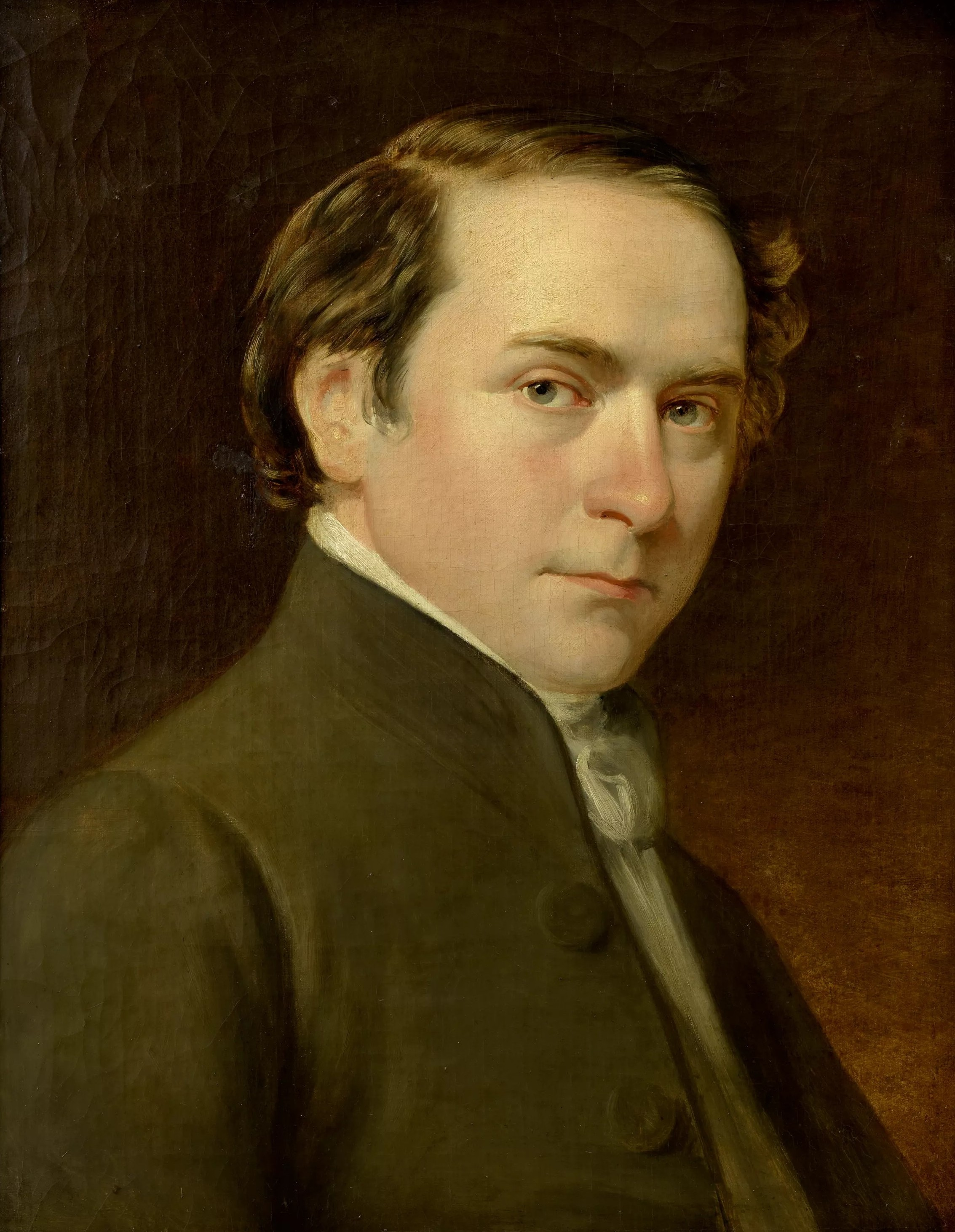
- Self-portrait, c. 1830
- Born: Erasmus Engert; 24 February 1796; Vienna, Austria
- Died: 14 April 1871 (aged 75); Vienna, Austria

Erasmus Engert (24 February 1796, Vienna – 14 April 1871, Vienna) was an Austrian painter and art restorer. Later, he became Erasmus Ritter von Engert.

== Biography ==
From 1809 to 1823, Engert studied at the Academy of Fine Arts, Vienna, and later made a study trip to Italy. On his return, he set himself up as a painter of portraits, historical scenes and copies of the Old Masters. In 1843, he was named a curator at the Imperial Painting Gallery in Belvedere Palace, where he devoted himself to restoration work.

In 1857, he became the gallery's director, and published what is now considered a very deficient catalog of the collection.

In 1865, Kaiser Franz Joseph I awarded him the title of Ritter (Knight) and entered him into the nobility.

== Sources ==
- Biographical notes from the Biographisches Lexikon des Kaiserthums Oesterreich @ WikiSource
- "Engerth Erasmus von". In: Österreichisches Biographisches Lexikon 1815–1950 (ÖBL). Vol. 1, Austrian Academy of Sciences, Vienna 1957, p. 252.
