= Acis and Galatea (Handel) =

1718 masque by Handel

George Frideric Handel

Acis and Galatea (HWV 49) is a musical work by George Frideric Handel with an English text by John Gay. The work has been variously described as a serenata, a masque, a pastoral or pastoral opera, a "little opera" (in a letter by the composer while it was being written), an entertainment and by the New Grove Dictionary of Music as an oratorio. The work was originally devised as a one-act masque which premiered in 1718.

Handel later adapted the piece into a three-act serenata for the Italian opera troupe in London in 1732, which incorporated a number of songs (still in Italian) from Aci, Galatea e Polifemo, his 1708 setting of the same story to different music. He later adapted the original English work into a two-act work in 1739.

Acis and Galatea was the pinnacle of pastoral opera in England. Indeed, several writers, such as musicologist Stanley Sadie, consider it the greatest pastoral opera ever composed. As is typical of the genre, Acis and Galatea was written as a courtly entertainment about the simplicity of rural life and contains significant quantities of wit and self-parody. The secondary characters, Polyphemus and Damon, provide humour without diminishing the pathos of the tragedy of the primary characters, Acis and Galatea. The music of the first act is both elegant and sensual, while the final act takes on a more melancholy and plaintive tone. The opera was significantly influenced by the pastoral operas presented at the Theatre Royal, Drury Lane during the early 18th century. Reinhard Keiser and Henry Purcell also served as influences, but overall the conception and execution of the work is wholly individual to Handel.

Acis and Galatea was by far Handel's most popular dramatic work and is his only stage work never to have left the opera repertory. The opera has been adapted numerous times since its premiere, with a notable arrangement being made by Wolfgang Amadeus Mozart in 1788. Handel never gave the work in the form in which it is generally heard today, since it contains music which, while by Handel, was never added by him.

== Composition history ==
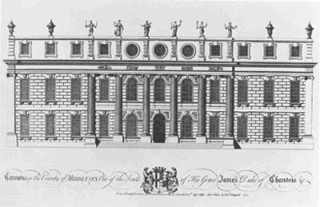
Cannons House, Middlesex

Handel composed the first version of Acis and Galatea while he was living at Cannons (the seat of James Brydges, 1st Duke of Chandos) during 1717–1718. It was Handel's first dramatic work in the English language and was clearly influenced by the English pastoral operas of Johann Ernst Galliard and Johann Christoph Pepusch, of whom the latter worked with Handel at Cannons. The work is set to a libretto by John Gay which is based on Ovid's Metamorphoses, xiii (see Acis and Galatea (mythology)), and there is some uncertainty as to whether he was the only author of the text. The structure of the writing indicates that the original work by Gay was intended for only three characters and that the text for more characters was added later, possibly by John Hughes or Alexander Pope whose writings were added to the work's text. The libretto also borrowed freely from John Dryden's English translation of Ovid published in 1717, The Story of Acis, Polyphemus and Galatea.

== Performance history ==
Acis and Galatea was first performed in the summer of 1718 at Cannons with local tradition holding that the work was performed outside on the terraces overlooking the garden. This is the period in which the gardens at Cannons were being extensively 'improved' with water features that included an impressive jet d'eau, and so the choice of Acis and Galatea at this time, given that the conclusion requires a fountain, seems particularly apt.

It is not clear whether the original performance was staged, semi-staged, or performed as a concert work. The Cannons version included only five singers – a soprano, three tenors and a bass – who not only sang the principal roles but also served as the "chorus". This version contained the character of Coridon who was subsequently deleted from later versions. Aside from the aria "As when the dove", which is a reworking of "Amo Tirsi" from Handel's cantata Clori, Tirsi e Fileno, all of the music was original to this production. Perhaps the best-known arias from this piece are the bass solo: "I rage, I melt, I burn" and the tenor aria "Love in her eyes sits playing". The instrumental music for this first version was orchestrated for a minimum of seven players (basso continuo, strings, and oboes doubling recorders; however it is possible that the violins were doubled to add a fuller sound, and some early copies may indicate the use of a bassoon). The opera was first published in 1722, and enjoyed a number of amateur performances in England from as early as 1719.

The work was not revived again professionally until 1731, when one performance was given in London without Handel's involvement. The following year, a staged production of the work was put on by Thomas Arne and John Frederick Lampe at the Little Theatre in the Haymarket. The production starred Thomas Mountier as Acis and Susannah Maria Cibber as Galatea. Arne advertised the work as "with all the Grand Chorus's, Scenes, Machines, and other Decorations; being the first Time it ever was performed in a Theatrical Way'."

The Little Theatre's production was highly successful and Handel, somewhat annoyed by the way Arne had promoted the production, retaliated by adapting the work substantially into a three-act serenata. This revised version incorporated music from his cantata Aci, Galatea e Polifemo (1708), as well as from other Italian cantatas and his Italian operas. The arias "Un sospiretto" and "Come la rondinella" were adapted from his cantata Clori, Tirsi e Fileno. The revised version was performed in a concert format in 1732 by the Italian opera in London and, according to Handel, included "a great Number of the best Voices and Instruments". The work was advertised on posters saying the following, "There will be no Action on the Stage, but the Scene will represent, in a Picturesque Manner, a rural Prospect, with Rocks, Groves, Fountains and Grotto's; amongst which will be disposed a Chorus of Nymphs and Shepherds, Habits, and every other Decoration suited to the Subject." Although successful, the three-act version was not as well received as Arne's production, as the mix of style and languages made the work oddly devised. Handel continued to make alterations to his 1732 version for successive performances up through 1741. He also gave performances of the original English work, adapting it into its two-act form in 1739.

Handel's two-act English version is the basis for the form of the work that is most often performed today, although modern productions typically use a different arrangement from the one that he himself actually devised. The work became Handel's most widely performed dramatic work during his lifetime, and has had a number of revivals in various forms, enjoying frequent performances throughout the 18th, 19th, 20th, and 21st centuries. Notably in 1788, Wolfgang Amadeus Mozart rescored the work for his then-patron Baron Gottfried van Swieten.

== Roles ==
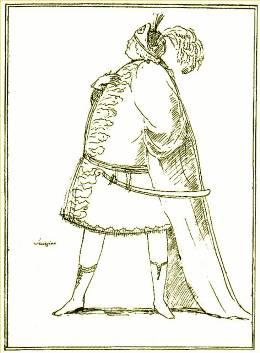
Caricature of Senesino, who sang the role of Acis in the 1732 performances

The cast of the 1718 version is unknown.

Roles, voice types, and premiere cast
Role	Voice type	Performance of 10 June 1732
Galatea	soprano	Anna Maria Strada del Pò
Acis	alto castrato	Francesco Bernardi, called "Senesino"
Damon, friend of Acis	tenor	unknown
Polyphemus	bass	Antonio Montagnana
Cloris	soprano	Ann Turner Robinson
Eurilla	soprano	Mrs. Davis
Filli	alto	Anna Bagnolesi
Dorinda	alto	Francesca Bertolli
Silvio	tenor	Giovanni Battista Pinacci

== Synopsis ==
Since Acis and Galatea has been adapted many times, it is impossible to provide a single synopsis that accurately reflects every presentation of the work. The following is a synopsis for the typical two-act presentation of the work that is most often used for modern performances.

=== Act 1 ===
Shepherds and nymphs enjoy "the pleasure of the plains". Galatea, a semi-divine nymph, is in love with the shepherd Acis, and tries to hush the birds that ignite her passion for him (Recit."Ye verdant plains" & Aria "Hush, ye pretty warbling quire!") Acis's close friend, the shepherd Damon, provides counsel to the lovers as they pursue each other. Acis sings a beautiful siciliana-style serenade, "Love in her eyes sits playing", upon their first meeting. The act closes with a duet by the young lovers, "Happy we", which is echoed by a chorus (not in the Cannons original).

=== Act 2 ===
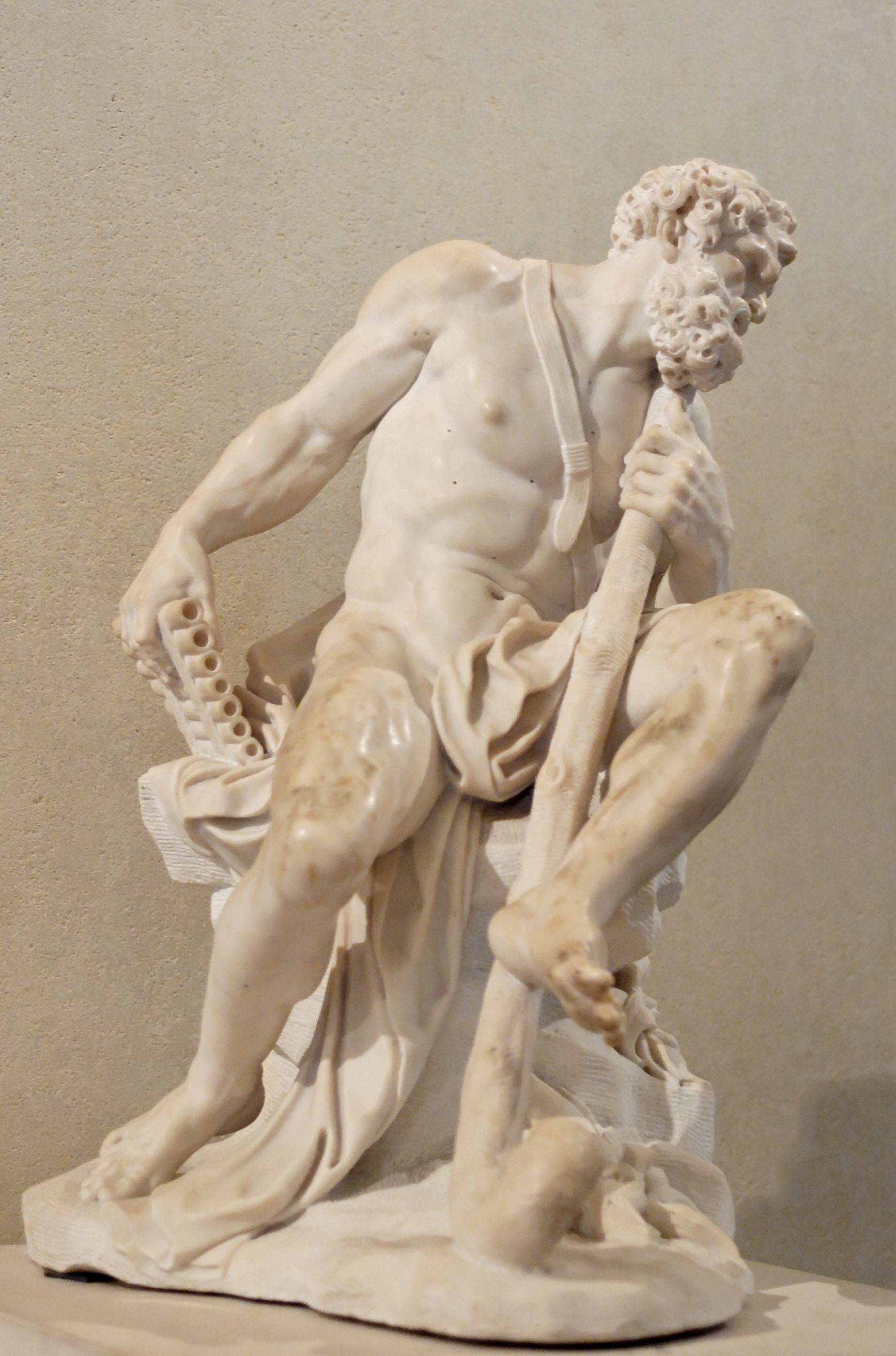
Polyphemus, by Van Cleve, Louvre

The opera shifts from its pastoral and sensual mood into an elegiac quality as the chorus warns Acis and Galatea about the arrival of a monstrous giant, Polyphemus, singing "no joy shall last". The fugal minor-key of the chorus's music along with the percussive lines in the lower instruments, indicating the heavy footsteps of the giant, provides an effective dramatic transition into the more serious nature of the second act. Polyphemus enters singing of his jealous love for Galatea, "I rage, I melt, I burn", which is in a part-comic furioso accompanied recitative. This is followed by his aria "O ruddier than the cherry" which is written in counterpoint to a sopranino recorder. Polyphemus threatens force but is somewhat soothed by the impartial shepherd, Coridon ("Would you gain the tender creature"). Meanwhile, Acis ignores Damon's warning of the fleeting existence of love's delight ("Consider, fond shepherd") and responds with hostility and the determination to resist ("Love sounds th' alarm"). Acis and Galatea promise eternal fidelity to each other in what begins as a duet ("The flocks shall leave the mountains") but ultimately turns into a trio when Polyphemus intrudes and in a rage murders Acis. Galatea, along with the chorus, mourns the loss of her love ("Must I my Acis still bemoan"). The chorus reminds her of her divinity and that with her powers she can transform Acis's body into a beautiful fountain. The work closes with Galatea's larghetto air, "Heart, the seat of soft delight", in which she exerts her powers to enact the transformation, ending with the chorus celebrating Acis's immortalisation.

== Recordings ==
Acis and Galatea discography
Year	Cast (Acis, Galatea, Damon, Polyphemus)	Conductor, Ensemble, and notes	Label
1959	Peter Pears, Joan Sutherland, David Galliver, Owen Brannigan	Adrian Boult; Saint Anthony Singers, Philomusica of London	Decca/London
1978	Robert Tear, Jill Gomez, Philip Langridge, Benjamin Luxon	Sir Neville Marriner; Academy & Chorus of St Martin in the Fields	Decca
1978	Anthony Rolfe Johnson, Norma Burrowes, Martyn Hill, Willard White	John Eliot Gardiner; The English Baroque Soloists (Cannons Version, 1718)	Audio CD: DG Archiv; Cat: 423406
1990	John Mark Ainsley, Claron McFadden, Rogers Covey-Crump, Michael George	Robert King; The King's Consort with Robert Harre-Jones, alto	Audio CD: Hyperion; Cat: CDA 66361/2
1992	Jamie MacDougall, Barbara Bonney, Markus Schäfer, John Tomlinson	Trevor Pinnock; The English Concert and Choir W.A. Mozart Edition, (K.566, 1788)	Audio CD: DG Archiv; Cat: 435 792-2
1992	David Gordon, Dawn Kotoski, Glenn Siebert, Jan Opalach	Gerard Schwarz; Seattle Symphony Orchestra and Chorale	Audio CD: Delos; Cat: DE 3107
1999	Paul Agnew, Sophie Daneman, Patricia Petibon, Alan Ewing	William Christie; Les Arts Florissants	Audio CD: Erato
2008	Nicholas Mulroy, Susan Hamilton, Thomas Hobbs, Matthew Brook	John Butt; Dunedin Consort (Original Cannons Performing Version (1718) recorded: Greyfriars Kirk, Edinburgh, UK: 29 April – 2 May 2008)	Audio CD and 24 bit download: Linn Records, Cat: CKD 319
2009	Charles Workman, Danielle de Niese, Paul Agnew, Matthew Rose	Christopher Hogwood; Orchestra of the Age of Enlightenment (Recording of a performance in the Royal Opera House, Covent Garden, March)	DVD: Opus Arte; Cat. No. OA 1025D; Blu-ray: Opus Arte; OA BD7056D
2018	Allan Clayton, Lucy Crowe, Benjamin Hulett, Neal Davies	Christian Curnyn, Early Opera Group	Audio CD Chandos Records Cat:CHSA0404(2)
2019	Jeremy Budd, Grace Davidson, Mark Dobell, Stuart Young	Harry Christophers, The Sixteen	Audio CD Coro Records Cat:COR16169

Source: Recordings of Acis and Galatea on operadis-opera-discography.org.uk
