= Festa teatrale =

Genre of opera

The term festa teatrale (Italian: [ˈfɛsta teaˈtraːle], plural: feste teatrali [ˈfɛste teaˈtraːli]) refers to a genre of drama, and of opera in particular. The genre cannot be rigidly defined, and in any case feste teatrali tend to be split into two different sets: feste teatrali divided by acts are operas, while works in this genre performed without division, or merely cut into two parts, are serenatas. A festa teatrale is a dramatic work, performed on stage (unlike many serenatas, which are labelled drammatico but were not performed in dramatic contexts).

The festa teatrale was always a fairly minor genre, born of courtly entertainments and the celebration of royalty – hence the abbreviated length of most feste teatrali, and the focus on drama, spectacle and chorus, as opposed to elaborate music. The poet and librettist Metastasio applied the term to 9 of his libretti. All but one of these were first performed for the court at Vienna. The last of these was Johann Adolph Hasse's Partenope, performed during 1767. Christoph Willibald Gluck's Orfeo ed Euridice, the first of his "reform operas" (also first seen at Vienna), is also often considered part of the genre of festa teatrale. Handel's Parnasso in Festa, presented in London in 1734 as part of the celebrations for the wedding of Anne, Princess Royal, is another example of the genre. The genre does not seem to have survived after Metastasio, though it had been in existence for over a century – Francesco Cavalli wrote feste teatrali, among many other early composers.
