= Ruthild Engert-Ely =

German mezzo-soprano

Ruthild Engert-Ely (9 October 1940 (Note: In reference works, including Kutsch/Riemens, the date of birth was often given as 1946. Her correct date of birth became officially known only with her death.) – 5 May 2013) was a German operatic mezzo-soprano and alto.

== Life ==
Born in Frankfurt, Engert-Ely first trained as a kindergarten teacher in her native town. Afterwards she worked as a nanny in London and later worked there as an art dealer. She studied singing at the Hoch Conservatory. Later, further studies followed with Josef Metternich in Cologne.

She made her stage debut at the Theater Osnabrück as Cherubino in The Marriage of Figaro. She had her first regular engagements at the Theater Koblenz (1969–1972) and at the Theater Freiburg (1972–1977) where she was the countess in Lortzing's Der Wildschütz. The then Freiburg director Peter Brenner and the musical director Marek Janowski supported Engert-Ely in her early years. In Freiburg she was able to acquire her first major roles: Rosina in The Barber of Seville, Octavia in Der Rosenkavalier and Ottavia in L'incoronazione di Poppea. After five years in Freiburg, she moved to the Staatstheater Hannover (1977–1979). There she sang Dorabella in Così fan tutte for the first time; the composer in Ariadne auf Naxos was also one of her role debuts.

Since 1979, she was a permanent member of the Deutsche Oper Berlin (DOB), to which she had been contracted by Siegfried Palm. She debuted there in 1979 as Cherubino in Le nozze di Figaro. Other (premiere) roles there included Hansel in Hänsel und Gretel (season 1979/80), Nicklausse/Muse in The Tales of Hoffmann (revival: September 1980), Alisa in Lucia di Lammermoor (premiere: December 1980), Cherubino (August 1981, in the opening performance of the 1981/82 season as a stand-in for Hanna Schwarz; also in the rehearsal in January 1985), Gymnasiast/Groom in Lulu (premiere: February 1982), the composer in Ariadne auf Naxos (house debut; March 1982), Meg Page in Falstaff (revival: April/May 1982; later also in the 1988/89 season), Fenena in Nabucco (among others in March 1981, further in the revival in May 1982), Preziosilla in La forza del destino (house debut in October 1982, further in the revival in January 1987), Fjodor in Boris Godunov (revival/re-recording: February 1983), Lucienne in Die tote Stadt (premiere: February 1983), Flora Bervoix in La traviata (rehearsal: April 1984, with Júlia Várady in the title role), Floßhilde in Das Rheingold (premiere: September 1984) and Götterdämmerung (premiere: September 1985), Fatime in Oberon (premiere: January 1986) and Warwara in Káťa Kabanová (premiere: March 1986; follow-up performances in March 1987). In October 1988, she sang Warwara in Götterdämmerung in the complete Ring cycle at the Deutsche Oper Berlin. In October 1990, she made her role and house debut there as Ortrud in Wagner's Lohengrin. In November 1992, she sang Preziosilla again in a new musical rehearsal of Verdi's opera La forza del destino. In November/December 1992, she took over the role of the crunchy witch in Hänsel and Gretel. In March 1993, she took over the role of Varvara again, this time "with lush vibrato" in mezzo-soprano, in the revival of the opera Káťa Kabanová.

She was officially a member of the Deutsche Oper ensemble until the 1995/96 season. In the course of her career, she sang roles ranging from the lyrical mezzo-soprano to the dramatic mezzo-soprano. At the Deutsche Oper, she also made the change from the lyrical to the dramatic mezzo-soprano part. Occasionally she also took on purely alto roles.

In the 1979/80 season she sang Fenena in a new production of Nabucco at the Deutsche Oper am Rhein (premiere: June 1980, director: Gert Westphal), as well as the Maddalena in Rigoletto (revival: April 1980). In the 1980/81 season she gave a guest performance at the Staatsoper Hamburg. There she sang in the new production of The Tales of Hoffmann (premiere: May 1981; director: Jürgen Flimm) "vocally beautiful and expressive" the voice of her mother and the second voice in the Barcarole. In the season 1980/81, without previous rehearsals, she took over as Cherubino in December 1980 at the Staatstheater Braunschweig in a new production of the opera Le Nozze di Figaro; "the two Cherubin arias became musical highlights of the evening in their intensely sensitive arrangement" In January 1984 she sang Prince Orlofsky in the Strauss operetta Die Fledermaus at the Staatsoper Hannover. She also gave a guest performance at the Staatstheater Oldenburg in 1985 as Kundry in Wagner's Bühnenweihfestspiel Parsifal (director: Michael Rothacker; with Mario Brell as Parsifal and Ks. Heinz-Klaus Ecker as Gurnemanz) and thus became known nationwide; this role was considered her special highlight. In the 1986/87 season she took on the role of Princess Eboli in Verdi's Don Carlos at the Theater Aachen; in the 1987/88 season, Lady Macbeth in Macbeth followed there. In May 1989, with the ensemble of the Deutsche Oper, she gave a guest performance at the International May Festival at Staatstheater Wiesbaden as Warwara in Katja Kabanowa; she "powerfully enhanced the role through intensive acting and magnificent mezzo tones." In November 1991 she appeared as Kundry at the Vienna State Opera. In the opening performance of the Theater Chemnitz she also appeared as Kundry in December 1992 (after several years of general renovation of the house). In 1999 she gave a guest performance at the Musiktheater im Revier in Gelsenkirchen as Herodias in Salome.

In 1982, Engert-Ely sang for the first time at the Bayreuth Festival. From 1982 to 1989, she was a member of the permanent ensemble of the Bayreuth Festival. There, she took on the following roles: 1. Knappe in Parsifal (1982–1985), the alto solo in Parsifal (1984/1985), Grimgerde in Die Walküre (1983), Schwertleite in Die Walküre (1985/1986) and in 1989 Venus in Tannhäuser (director: Wolfgang Wagner; musical direction: Giuseppe Sinopoli).

Engert-Ely frequently gave guest performances in other European countries and overseas. In 1988 she sang the role of Kundry in Parsifal at the Festival dei Due Mondi in Spoleto. She also appeared in Italy at the Teatro Regio di Torino (1987; as Clytemnestra in Elektra), at the Teatro Lirico Giuseppe Verdi in Trieste (February 1988; "impressive" as composer), at the Teatro La Fenice in Venice (1988, as composer), in Genoa (June 1988 as Fricka in Die Walküre; 1997 as Türkenbaba in The Rake's Progress), at La Scala (1990; as Magdalene in Die Meistersinger von Nürnberg) and several times at the Teatro Massimo Bellini in Catania (April/May 1992 as Octavian in Der Rosenkavalier, with Renata Scotto as Marschallin in her role debut; 1994 as Venus; 1998 as Klytämnestra).

She also gave guest performances at the Teatro Real in Madrid, at the Teatro Nacional de São Carlos in Lisbon, in Paris (February 1989; as Magdalene at the Palais Garnier), in Montpellier (February 1993 as Ortrud, 1995), in Nice (1993 as Clairon in Capriccio; 1995 as Klytämnestra) and in Amsterdam (September 1993 as Kundry; June 1995 as Magdalene). She appeared several times at the Flemish Opera (De Vlaamse Opera) in Antwerp and Ghent: 1990 as Kundry in Parsifal (Ghent), 1991 also as Kundry in Parsifal (Antwerp), 1994 as Ortrud (Ghent), 1996 as Kundry (Ghent/Antwerp), 1996 as Principessa in Suor Angelica and Zita in Gianni Schicchi (both in Antwerp).

In the United States, she gave a guest performance in Charleston (June/July 1987 and 1990; as Kundry in Parsifal), at the Metropolitan Opera in New York City (April 1990; as Fricka in Die Walküre), at the Washington Opera (1997; as Klytämnestra) and several times at the Hawaii Opera in Honolulu (1999 also as Klytämnestra; 2002 as Herodias in Salome). In May 1994 she sang Venus in Tannhäuser at the Teatro Colón in Buenos Aires.

Engert-Ely also appeared as a concert and song singer. In June 1986 she appeared in a concert of the Berlin Philharmonic under the musical direction of Heinrich Hollreiser; Engert-Ely took over the alto parts in Mozart's Coronation Mass and in Beethoven's Mass in C major op. 86. In October 1988, she sang "with expressive, warm mezzo-soprano, which only lacked the otherwise pleasantly round sound at the very bottom", the alto part in Handel's Messiah in a scenic performance in the DOB. In November 1988, she took over the mezzo-soprano part in Verdi's Requiem with the Berlin Philharmonic Orchestra. In November 1991, she sang in the Verdi Requiem in a performance of the Bochumer Symphoniker conducted by Eberhard Kloke in the auditorium of the Ruhr-Universität Bochum, in which "her full well-fitting mezzo-soprano with ability for dramatic attack was impressively employed". In recitals she interpreted songs by Robert Schumann, Gustav Mahler, Richard Strauss, Franz Schreker and Alexander Zemlinsky among others. She also gave singing lessons.

Engert-Ely was married to the musicologist Norbert Ely. After her marriage, she also performed under the name Ruthild Engert-Ely. Engert died in Berlin at the age of 72 after a serious illness.

== Repertoire ==
Engert-Ely sang a broad repertoire on stage, which included baroque music, operas from Wolfgang Amadeus Mozart to Giuseppe Verdi, but especially works from the turn of the century, the 20th century and classical modernism.

Her other stage roles included Dorabella in Così fan tutte, Brangäne in Tristan und Isolde, Waltraute in Götterdämmerung, Hansel, later also Gertrud/Hexe in Hänsel und Gretel and Charlotte in the opera Die Soldaten (1983, Deutsche Oper Berlin; season 1987/1988 in Paris).

== Recordings ==
Several sound documents with the voice of Ruthild Engert-Ely exist; however, her main roles are not sufficiently documented on sound recordings.

In April 1987 she performed the role of Schwertleite in a recording of the opera Die Walküre under the musical direction of James Levine at the Manhattan Center in New York City. The recording was released by Deutsche Grammophon. In June 1987 she appeared as the nurse Filipjewna in a recording of the opera Eugene Onegin, which was recorded at the Lukaskirche in Dresden; her partners were Mirella Freni (Tatjana) and James Levine (conductor). The recording was first released in 1988 (still on vinyl), also by Deutsche Grammophon. In a complete recording of Prokovief's opera The Fiery Angel she took on the roles of the fortune teller and the abbess; the recording was also released on CD by Deutsche Grammophon in 1990.

Also live and radio recordings of her performance at the Bayreuth Festival exist. Some of these were published on CD. Philips has released a CD with a recording of Parsifal from the Bayreuth Festspielhaus in 1985, in which Engert-Ely can be heard in her Bayreuth roles (1st miner and alto solo).

A recording of the Bayreuth Tannhäuser 1989 performance with Engert-Ely as Venus was issued on DVD.
