= David Gordon (tenor) =

American opera singer

David Gordon (born December 7, 1947) is an American concert and opera tenor, particularly noted as a Bach singer.

He was born in Doylestown, Pennsylvania and trained at McGill University, the College of Wooster, and the Lyric Opera of Chicago where he made his debut in 1973. He went on to appear as soloist with orchestras and operas worldwide.

Gordon is on the staff of the Carmel Bach Festival in California. Aside from his international vocal career, he is a teacher of Baroque vocal styles and has been an innovator in the creation of English supertitles for the great choral masterworks of Bach and Handel.

== Sources ==
- Carmel Bach Festival, Program: July 5-31, 2010
- Cummings, David (ed.), "Gordon, David (Jamieson)", International Who's Who in Classical Music 2003, Routledge, 2002, p. 290. ISBN 1-85743-174-X
- Polkow, Dennis "Bach to bluegrass David Gordon had no problem adjusting to a range of styles", Chicago Tribune, February 22, 1991, Tempo section p. 3
