= Andreas Halbig =

German sculptor (1807–1869)

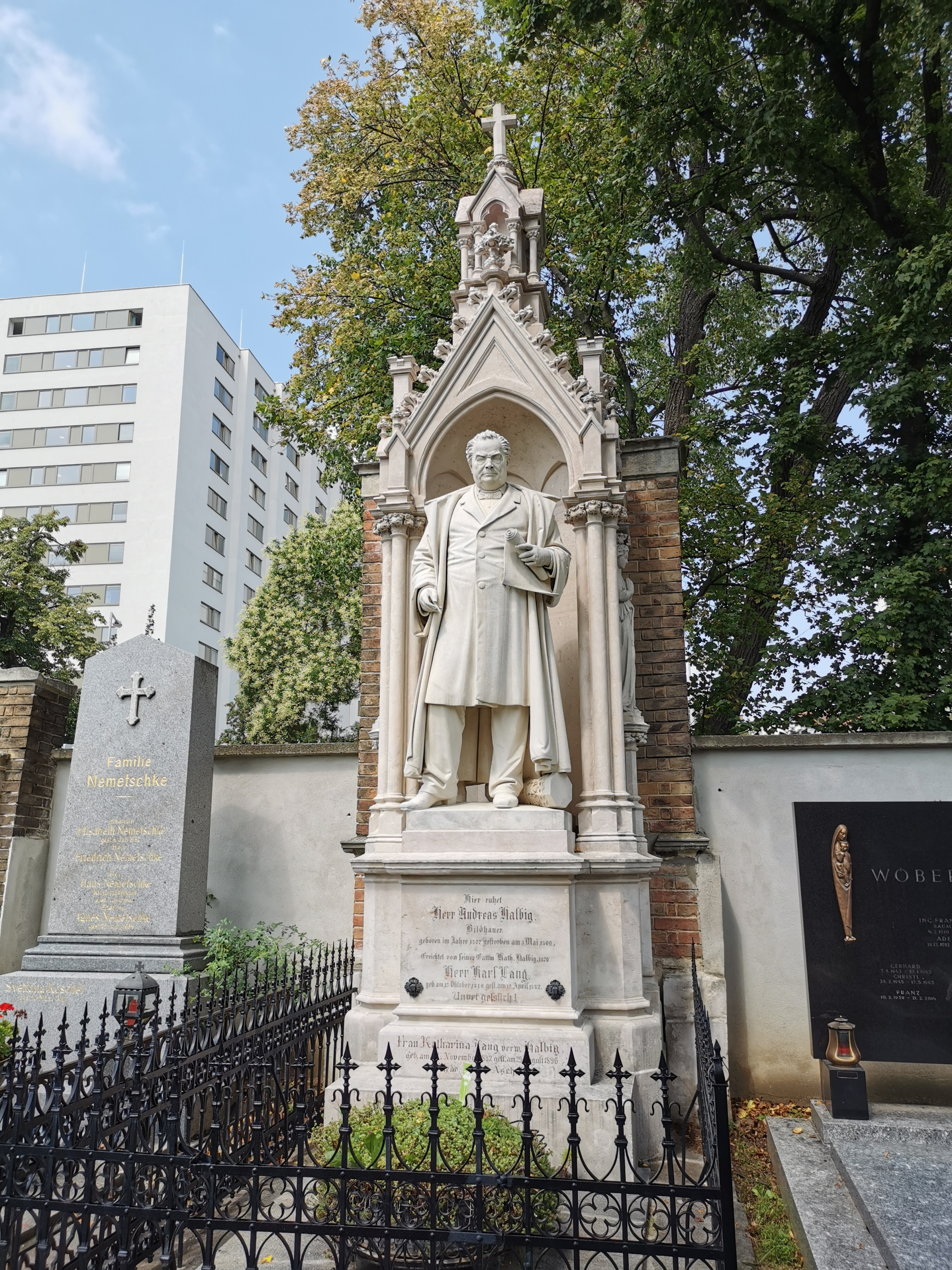
- Andreas Halbig grave monument by Johann Halbig in Penzing Parish Cemetery
- Born: 24 April 1807; Donnersdorf
- Died: 3 May 1869 (aged 62); Vienna
- Occupation: sculptor

Andreas Halbig (24 April 1807, Donnersdorf – 3 May 1869, Penzing, Vienna), was a German sculptor, and brother to sculptor Johann Halbig.

Halbig studied under Konrad Eberhard in Munich, provided work for Bavarian churches and was responsible for the restoration of the Marienkapelle (Lady Chapel) in Würzburg. He probably equipped classical side altars to the Bartholomäuskirche (St Bartholomew's Church ) in Oberspiesheim, a district of the Kolitzheim municipality in Lower Franconia.

In 1856 he moved to Vienna where, from 1857 to 1869, he worked on a stone, polychrome high altar in Gothic Revival style, which is considered his major work. The altar was originally intended for Vienna's Votive Church (Votivkirche). Heinrich von Ferstel, the builder of the Votivkirche, rejected the altar as it would have interrupted the view of the choir ambulatory; the altar was consequently placed in Vienna's Augustinian Church in 1873.

Halbig's grave monument was erected by his brother Johann Halbig. A street in Donnersdorf was named after him.

== Further reading and sources ==
- "Halbig, Andreas". In: Österreichisches Biographisches Lexikon 1815–1950 (ÖBL). Vol. 2, Austrian Academy of Sciences, Vienna 1959, p. 159.
- Lützow, Karl von (Hrg.): "Nekrolog" in Zeitschrift für bildende Kunst, vol. 4, Leipzig 1869, p. 219
