= Ernst Mayer =

German sculptor

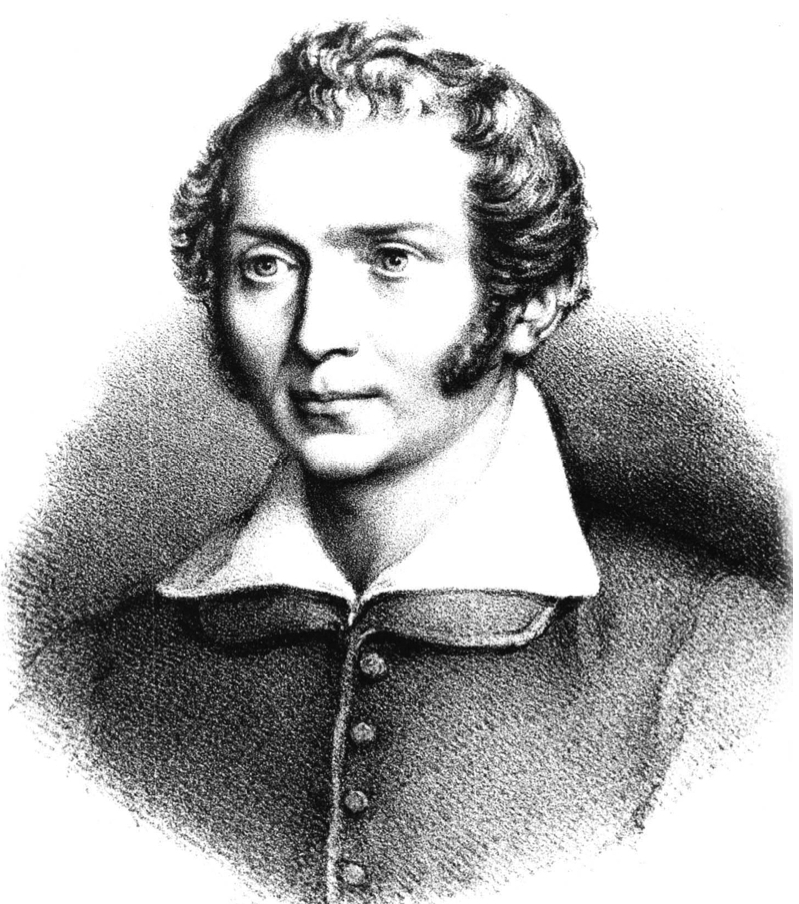
- Ernst Mayer ca. 1835
- Born: Ernst Mayer; 24 June 1796; Ludwigsburg, Holy Roman Empire
- Died: 21 January 1844 (aged 47); München
- Known for: Sculpting
- Movement: Classicism

Ernst Mayer (24 June 1796 – 21 January 1844) was a German sculptor in the classical style. He was a pupil of Antonio Isopi and worked for Leo von Klenze, mainly in Munich where in 1830 he became Professor of Sculpture at the Polytechnic, now the Technical University.

== Life ==
Mayer was the ninth child of Johann Ernst Mayer (1754–1812), a stocking manufacturer, who had become master of the household and garden supervisor at the Ludwigsburg castle of Duke (later King) Friedrich I of Württemberg. After elementary school, in 1810, Ernst Mayer was apprenticed to Antonio Isopi, the Italian sculptor working for the king. From him he learned the crafts of sculpture, casting and ornament as well as the Italian language, which was beneficial to him on his later sojourn in Rome. When he had finished his apprenticeship he worked for Isopi both in Ludwigsburg and in Wasseralfingen, where Isopi's colossal sculptures of a lion and stag – still to be seen in front of the Stuttgart New Castle – were cast. In 1818 Leo von Klenze invited the 22-year-old Ernst Mayer, together with Isopi, to Munich and employed him in his workshop.

Between 1818 and 1820 Mayer restored antique sculptures for the Glyptothek. He also created stucco models for the ceiling of Klenze's riding hall and casting moulds for Johann Martin von Wagner's ornaments of the portal and the façade of the new riding school.

From 1821 to 1825 Mayer was in Rome and again worked for von Wagner, who acquired antique statues for crown prince and future king Ludwig I of Bavaria. At the same time he was employed by the Danish sculptor Bertel Thorvaldsen, for whom he created reliefs for the Walhalla in Regensburg. Mayer also created part of the memorial for Eugène de Beauharnais, stepson of Napoleon's stepson and son-in-law of King Maximilian I of Bavaria, which had been designed by Klenze and was completed by Thorvaldsen. The two genii at the bottom of the monument are by Mayer.

Back in Munich, Mayer continued restoring antique statues, but also created sculptures of his own, including the pediment figures for the Glyptothek building, among them three antique artists representing the crafts that Mayer himself practised: the modeller (Koroplastes), the bronze caster (Statuarius) and the stone sculptor (Glyptos).

In 1830 Mayer became Professor of Stone Sculpting at the Polytechnic in Munich. He married Amailie Burgett (1808 – 1880) and the couple had three daughters and one son.

Mayer died in Munich at the age of 47 on 21 January 1844 of a skull fracture after a fall on ice in front of his workshop. His successor at the Munich Polytechnic was his pupil Johann Halbig.

== Major works ==
(see picture gallery)

- three large and six small figures in the Glyptothek pediment
- marble bust of Mayer's teacher an employer Bertel Thorvaldsen
- two angels at the bottom of Klenze'/Thorvaldsen's de Beauharmais-tomb
- Thukydides and Homer
- Heine-Memorial in Würzburg
- 8 marble candelabra and seats and a marble table at the Walhalla

== Picture Gallery ==
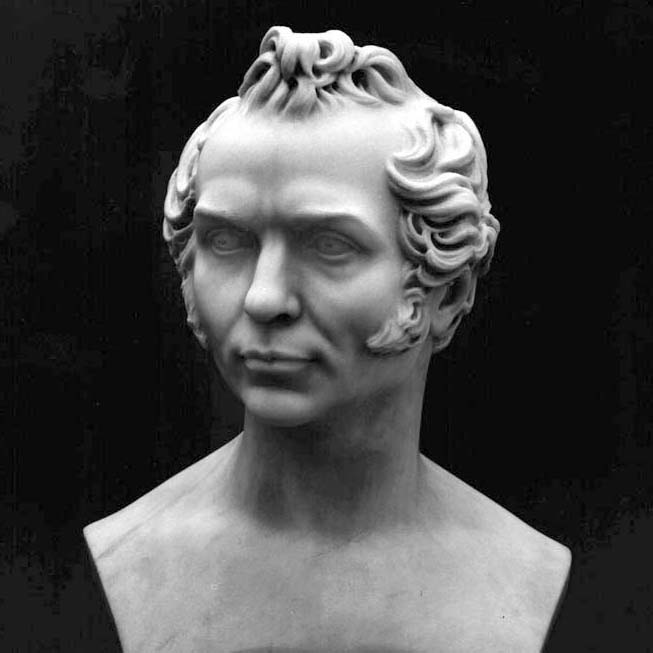
Ernst Mayer (bust by his pupil Johann Halbig)

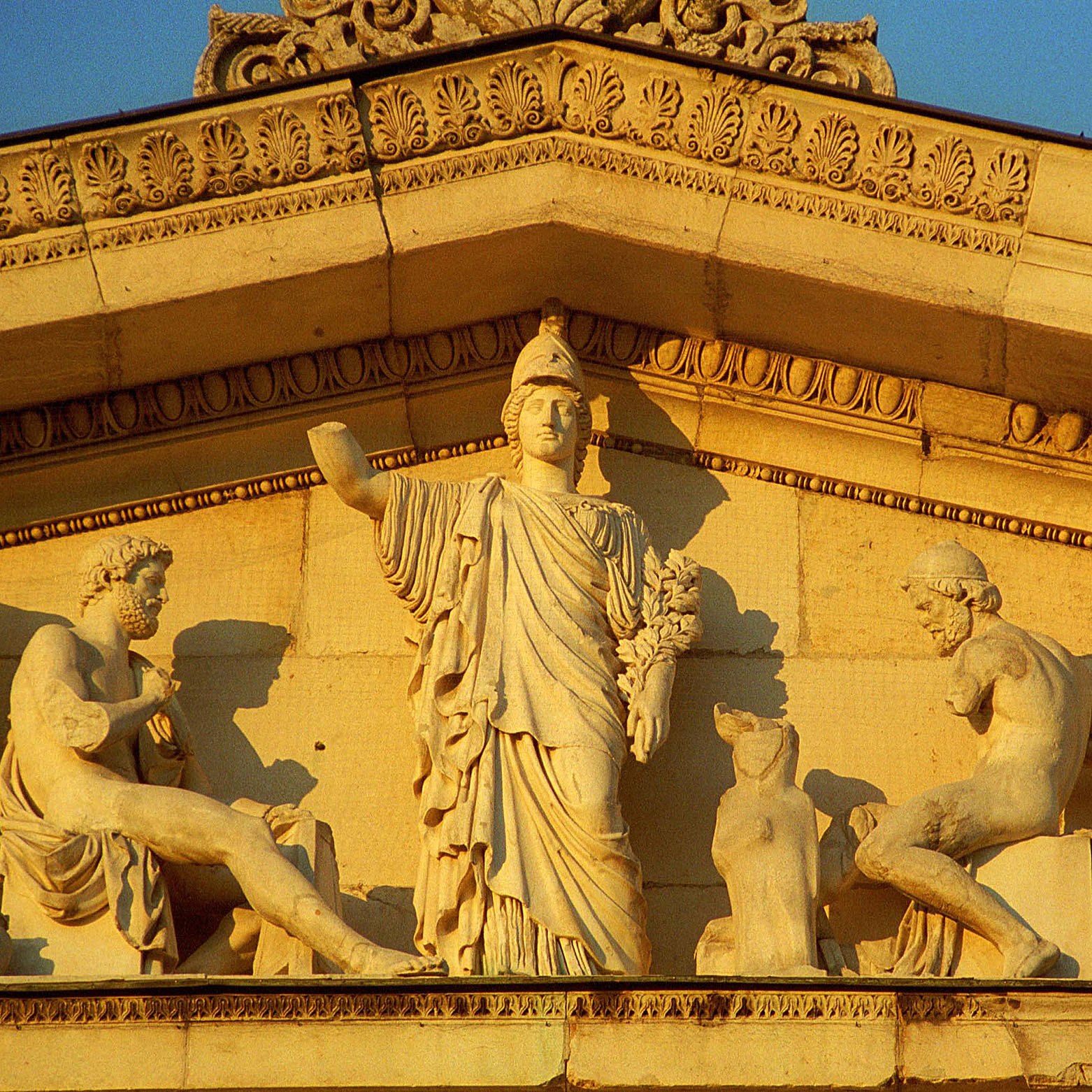
Pediment of the Glyptothek

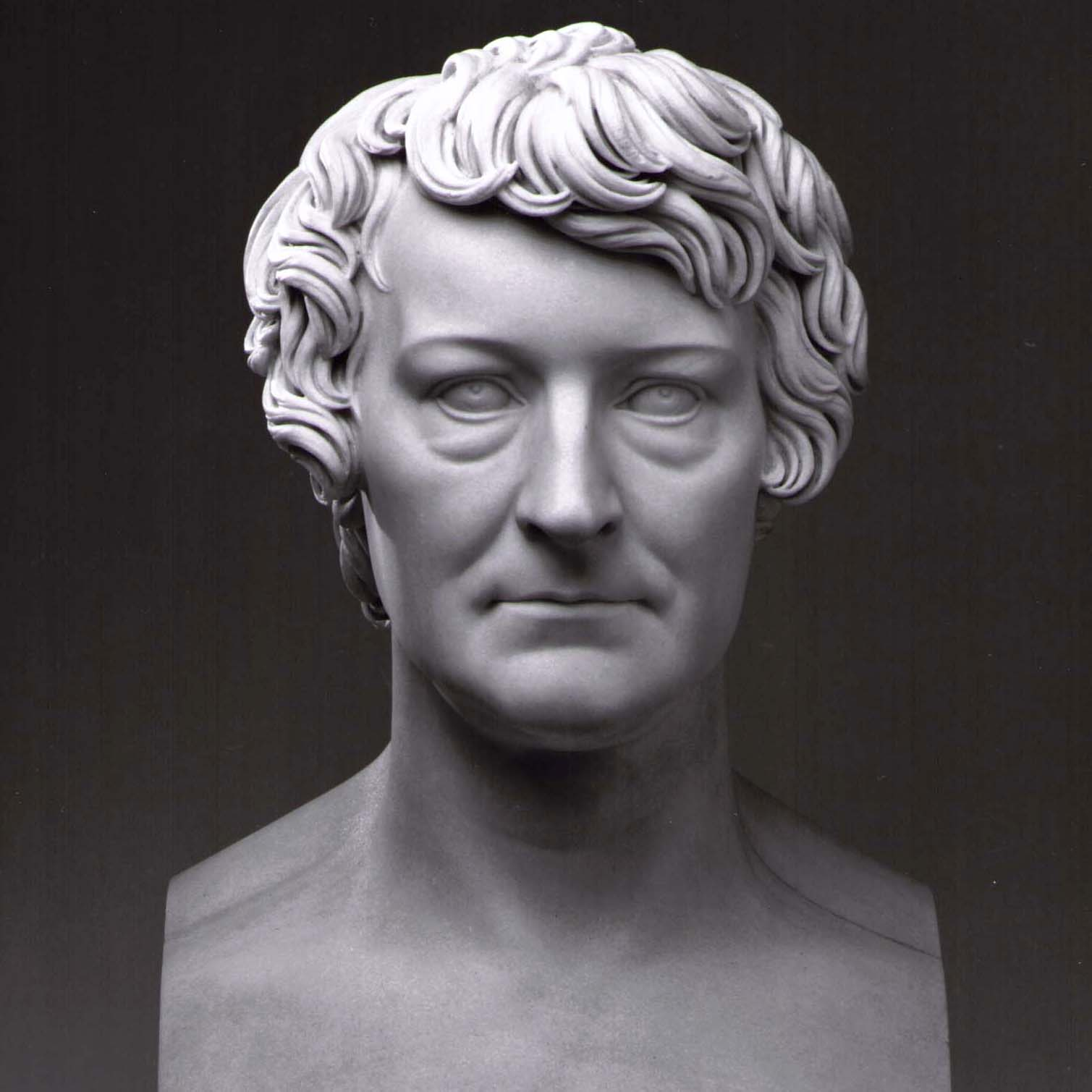
Bertel Thorvaldsen, (bust by Ernst Mayer)

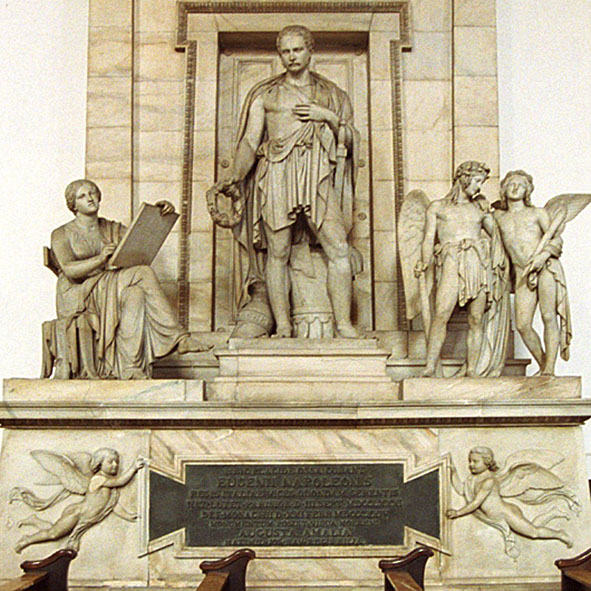
Memorial for Eugène de Beauharnais

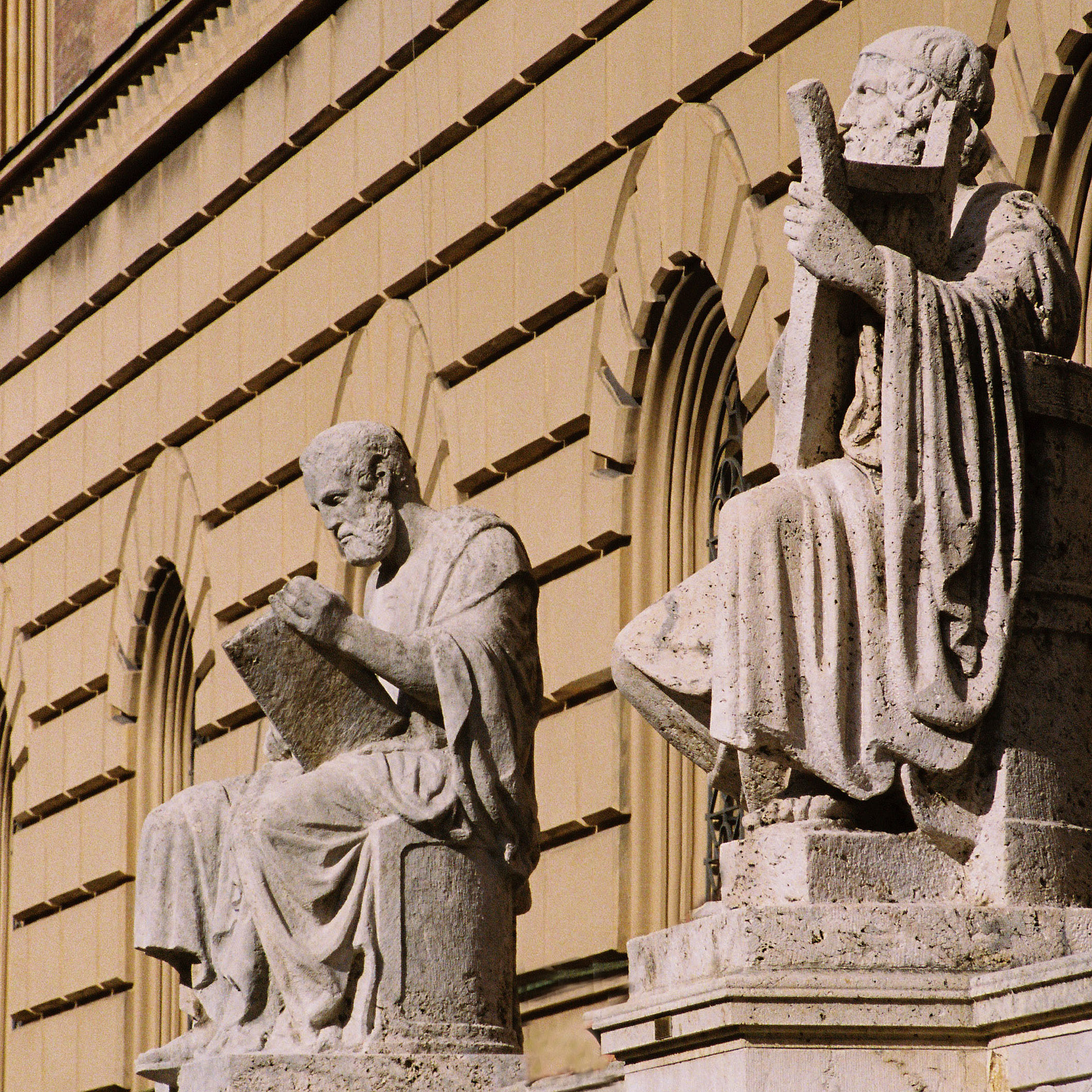
Thukydides und Homer

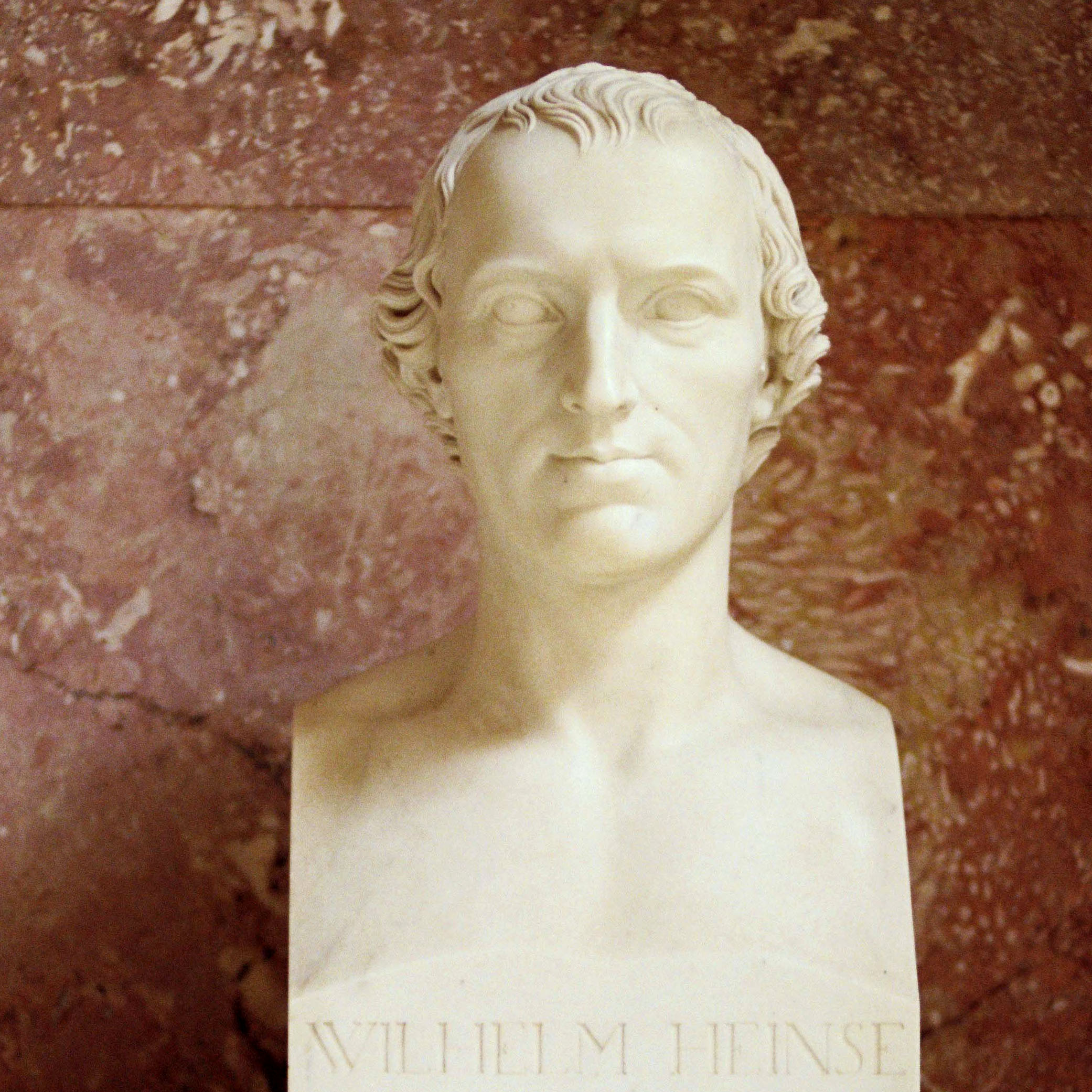
Wilhelm Heinse-bust

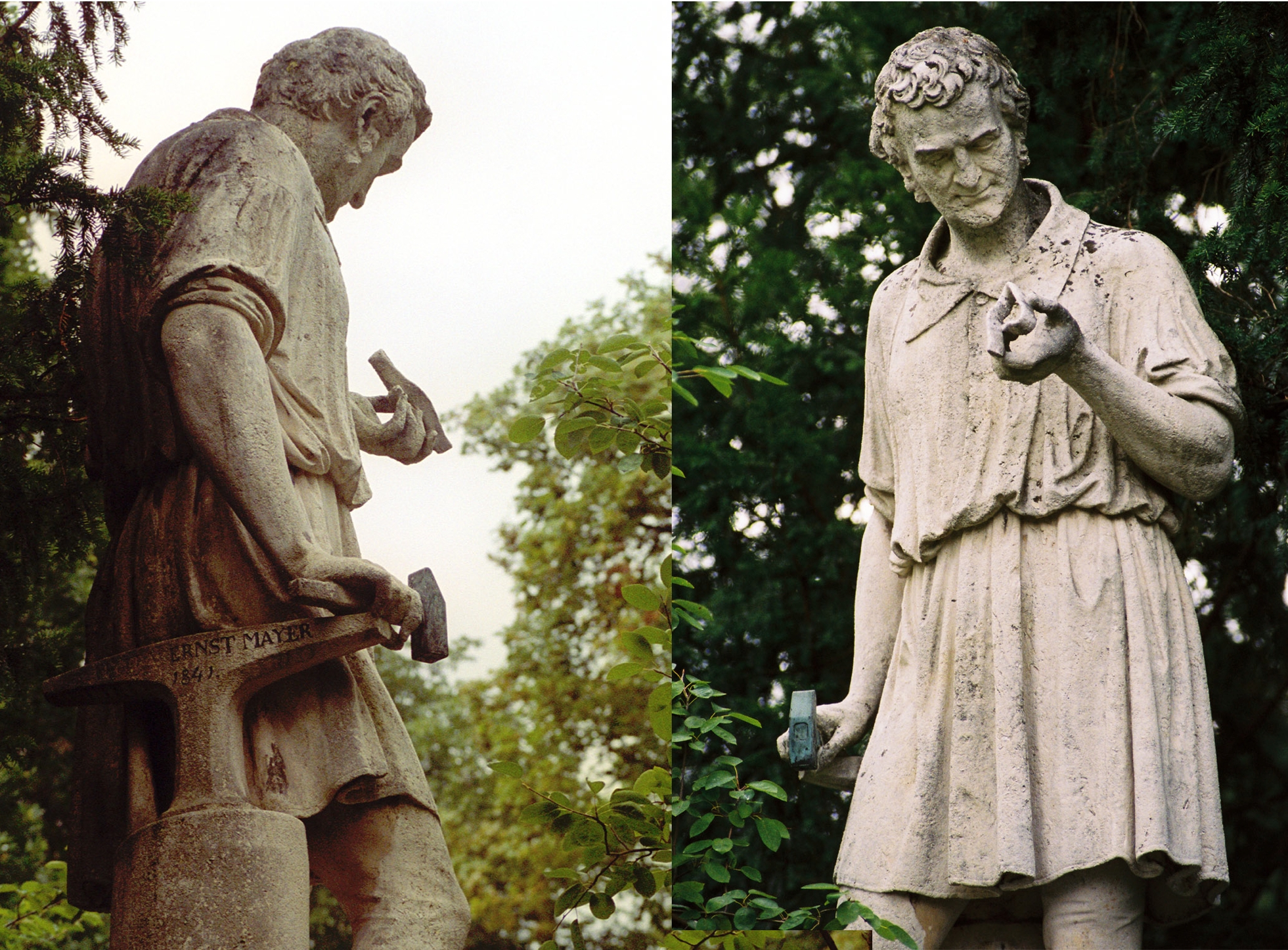
Heine-Memorial
in Würzburg

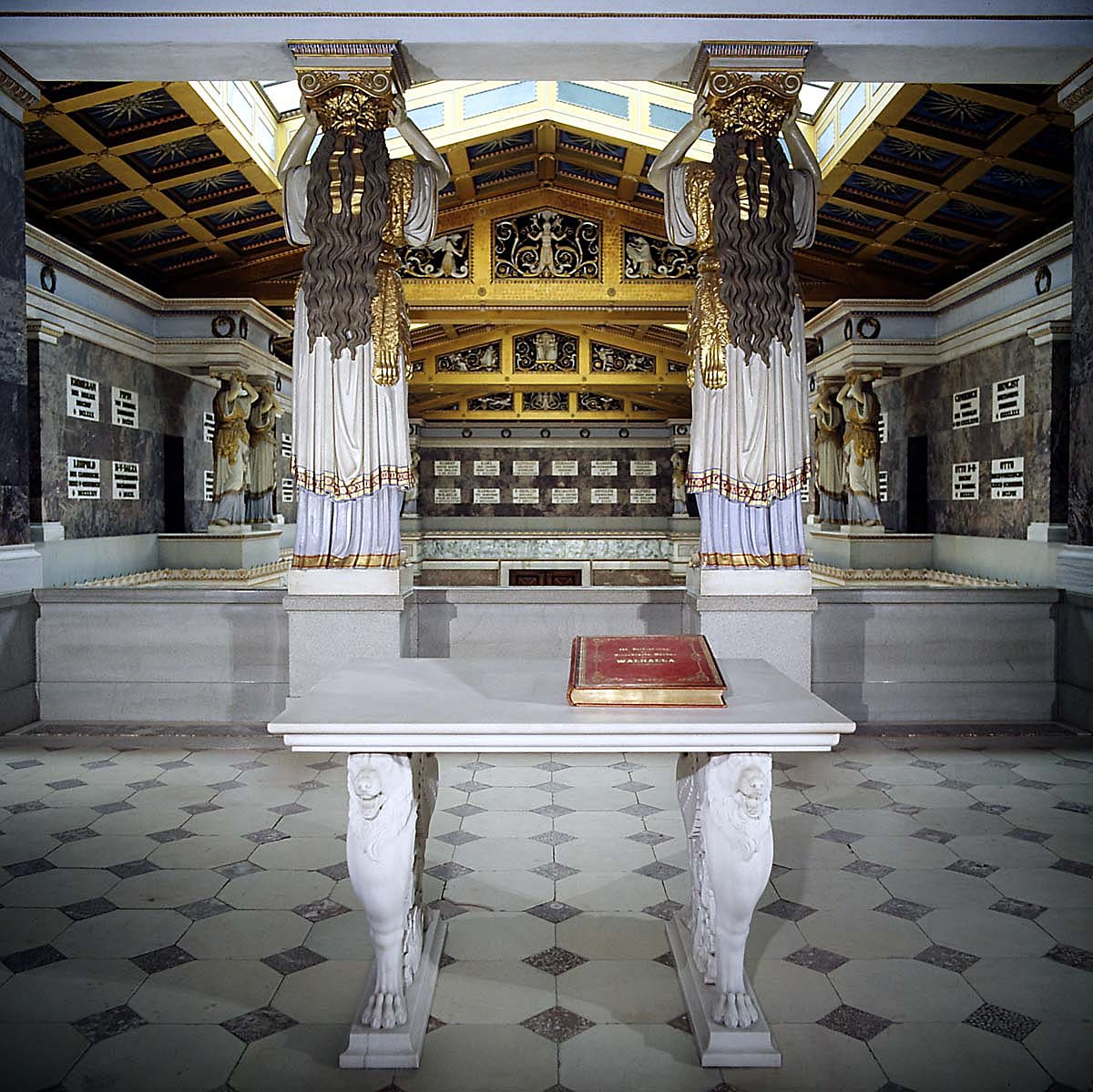
Marble table
in the Walhalla

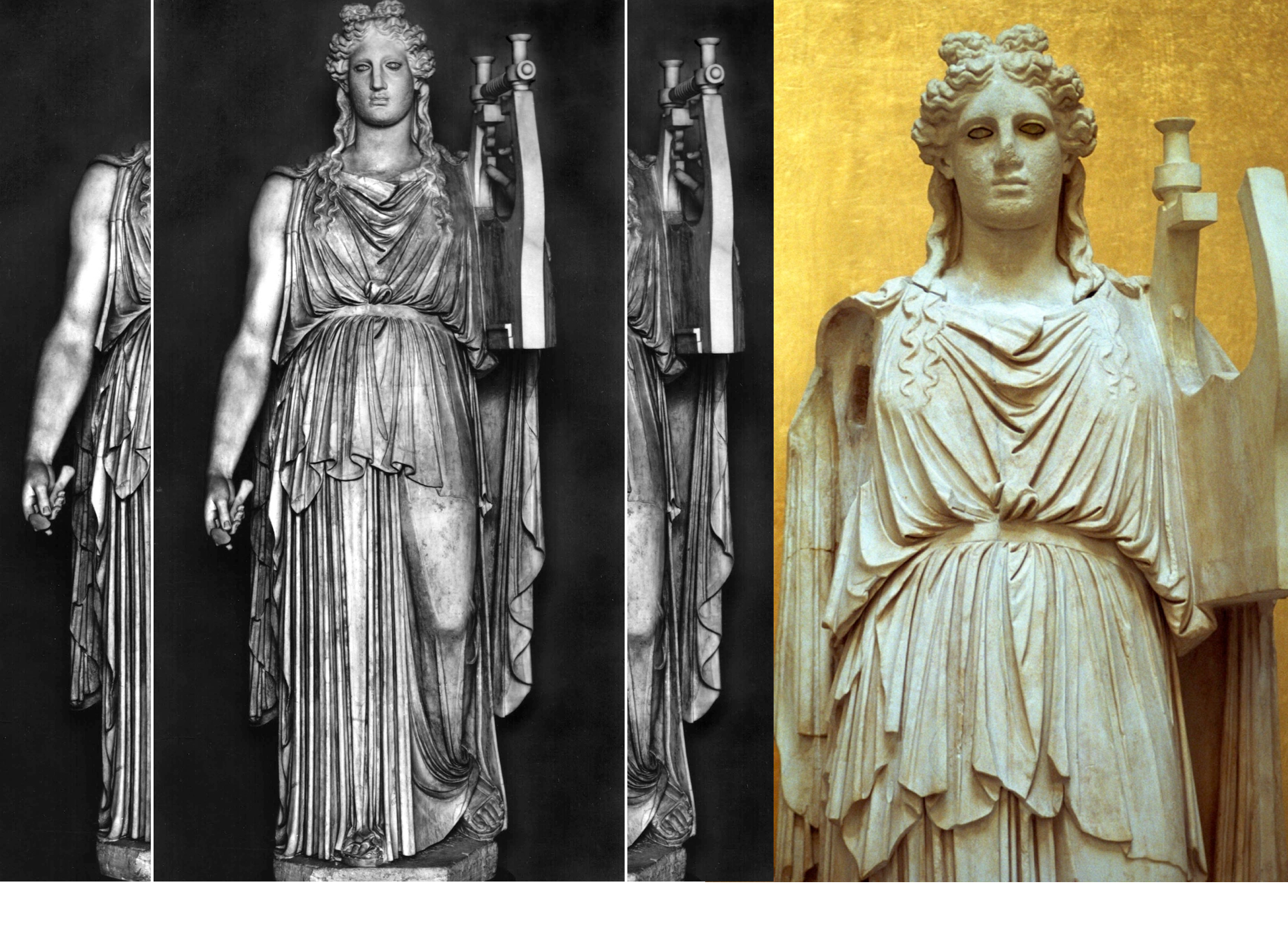
Mayer's restoration of the Barbarinian Apollo (left), "purified" in 1967 (right)
