= Donnersdorf =

- Municipality
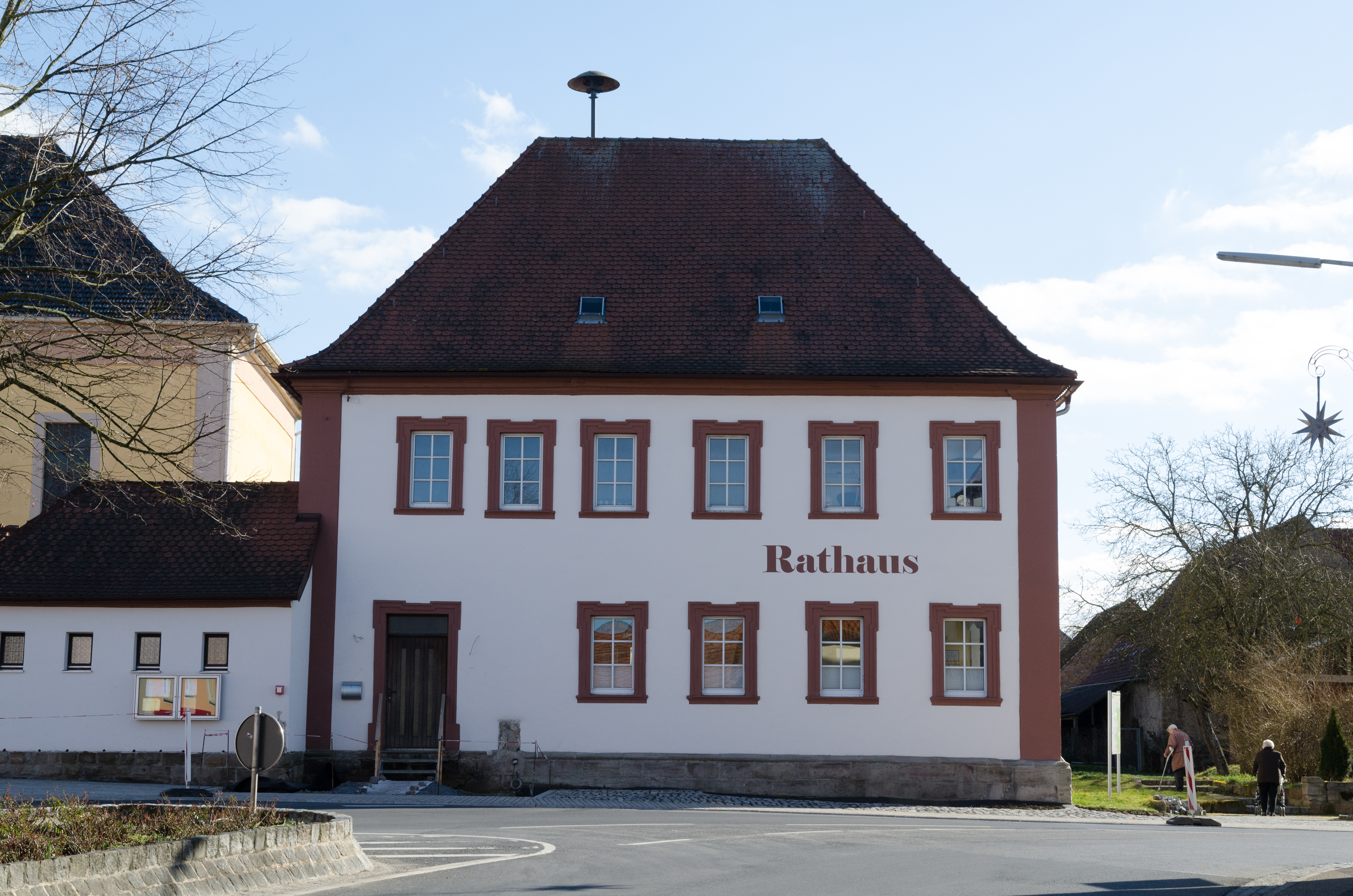
- Town hall

- Coat of arms

- Location of Donnersdorf within Schweinfurt district
- Interactive map of Donnersdorf
- Location within Germany Location within Bavaria
- Coordinates: 49°58′N 10°25′E
- Country: Germany
- State: Bavaria
- Admin. region: Unterfranken
- District: Schweinfurt
- Municipal assoc.: Gerolzhofen

Government
  - Mayor (2020–26): Klaus Schenk (CSU)

Area
  - Total: 26.97 km^{2} (10.41 sq mi)
- Elevation: 251 m (823 ft)

Population (2025-12-31)
  - Total: 1,948
  - Density: 72.23/km^{2} (187.1/sq mi)
- Time zone: UTC+01:00 (CET)
  - Summer (DST): UTC+02:00 (CEST)
- Postal codes: 97499
- Dialling codes: 09528
- Vehicle registration: SW
- Website: www.donnersdorf.de

Donnersdorf (German pronunciation: [ˈdɔnɐsdɔʁf]) is a municipality in the district of Schweinfurt in Bavaria, Germany.

== Notable people ==
=== Born at Donnersdorf ===
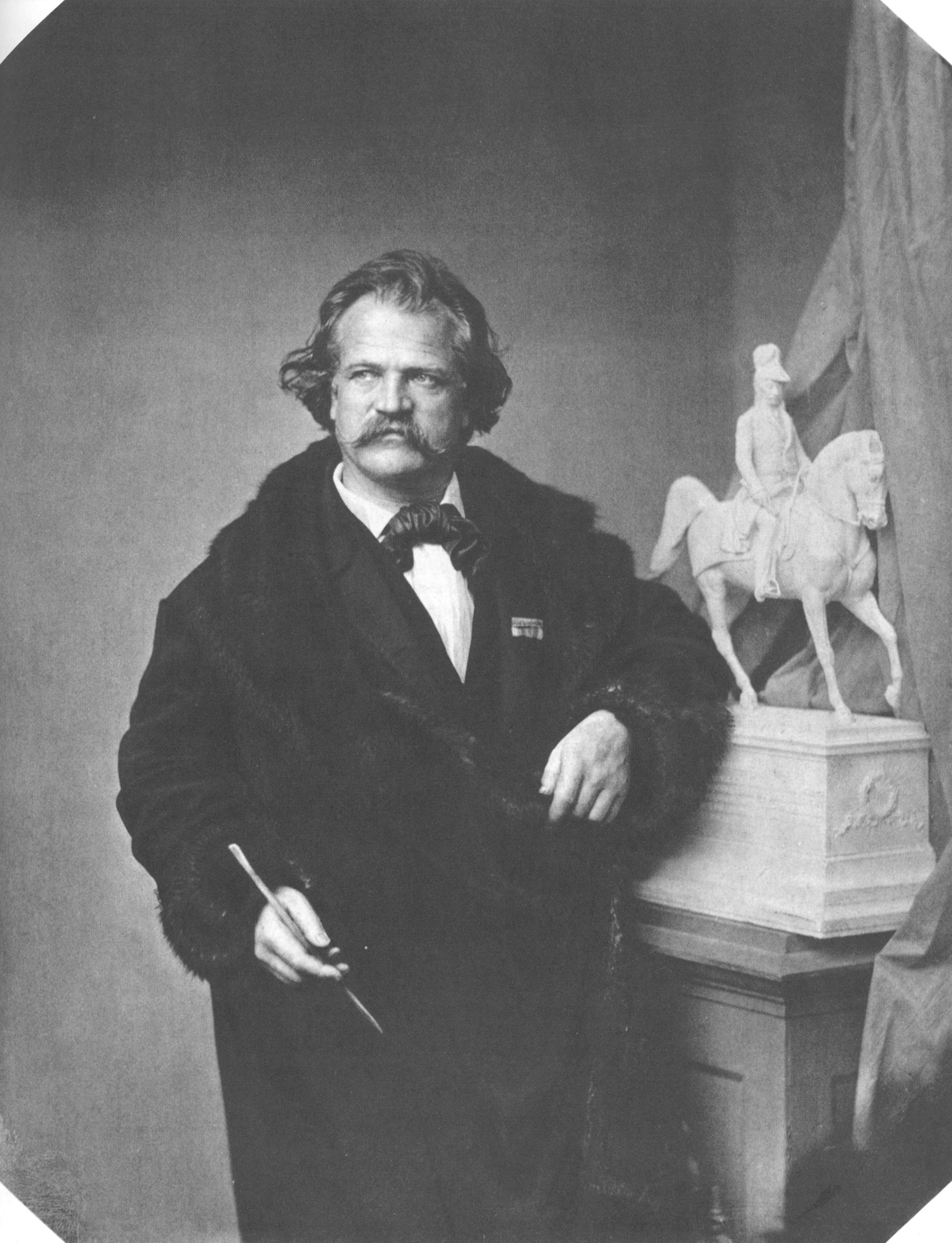
Johann Halbig around 1860

- Andreas Halbig (1807–1869), German sculptor
- Johann Halbig (1814–1882), German sculptor

=== Others ===
- Gerhard Eck (* 1960), State Secretary in the Bavarian State Ministry of the Interior and mayor of Donnersdorf from 1990 to 2009
- Bernhard Grzimek (1909–1987), pioneer of the world nature conservation, had his retirement age in the middle mill near Donnersdorf
