= Antonio Isopi =

Italian sculptor

- Born: Antonio Aloysius Petrus Isopi; 5 February 1758; Rome
- Died: 3 October 1833 (aged 75); Ludwigsburg,
- Known for: Sculpting
- Movement: Classicism

Antonio Isopi (5 February 1758 – 3 October 1833) was a Roman sculptor of Classicism mainly working at the court of the Dukes (later Kings) of Württemberg. Antonio Aloysius Petrus Isopi first lived and worked in his home city as a sculptor and soon specialized on restoring antique pieces of art. The iron cast Württemberg heraldic animals lion and hart – still to be seen in front of Stuttgart's New Castle – are one of his major works.

== Life ==
Antonio was the third son of Silvestro and Geltrude Isopi née Orlandi. The father was a servant of Don Giuseppe Finali, a cleric at the papal court. Only four of the eleven children born between 1754 and 1772 reached adulthood. The Isopis lived in the centre of Rome near the Trevi fountain. Since 1768 until Antonio's departure to Germany the family lived in a servant wing of Palazzo Apostolico Quirinale – once the summer residence of the pope, today the residence of Italy's president.

== Artistic career ==
Isopi was trained by the sculptors Francesco Franzoni (1734–1818 ) and Lorenzo Cardelli (1733–1794). Equally, the re-discovery and restoration of antique sculptures and the work of sculptor and restorer Bartolomeo Cavaceppi influenced Isopi's style. He worked in the Villa Borghese and in the Museo Pio Clementino. Cardelli's workshop was next-door to Antonio Canova's, the new star in the world of art. Franzoni – coming from an established family of stone sculptors and marble quarry owners in Carrara – was becoming the leading restorer of antique statues in the Vatican. Several times Pope Pius VI personally visited his workshop.
In the 1780s Isopi had his own workshop and training centre in Rome, where he taught sculpting, restoring and ornamenting, which was beneficial for his later occupation in Württemberg.

== Work at the Stuttgart court ==
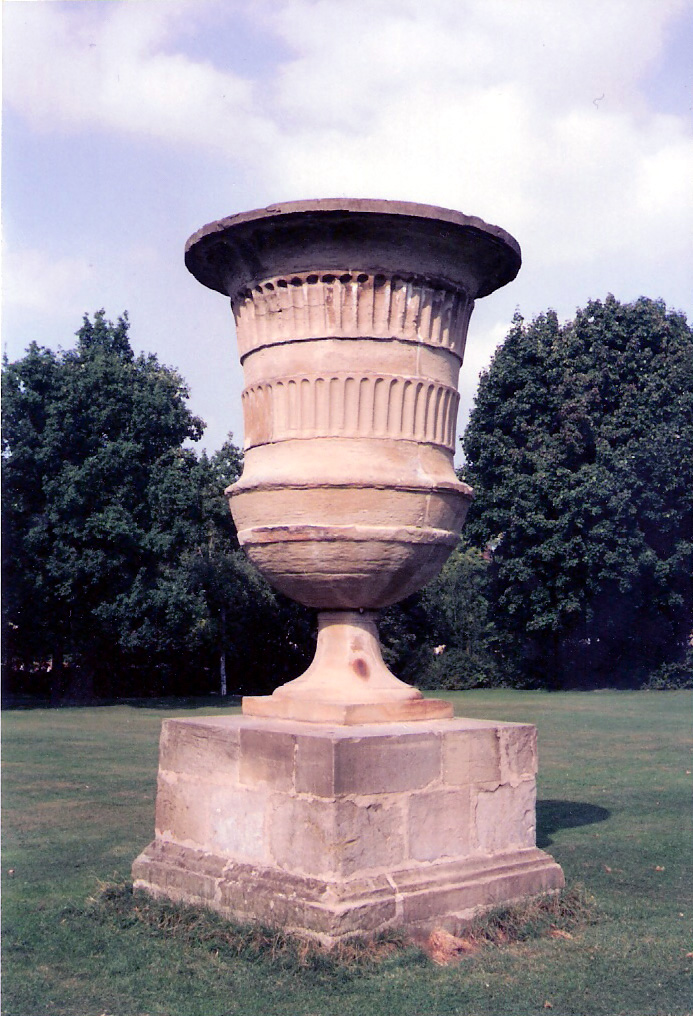
Monumental vase in Ludwigsburg

The ambassador to the Vatican of Württemberg's Duke Carl Eugen, Gaetano Marini, recommended Isopi to the duke as an ornament designer and animal sculptor. Isopi was to be a professor at the Hohe Karlsschule and teach Württemberg's youth stone sculpting. These plans were never realized, since Duke Carl Eugen died in 1793, soon after Isopi's arrival in Stuttgart. The school was closed soon afterwards.
In 1795 Isopi became a member of the committee for residence construction and worked in the castles in Stuttgart, Hohenheim and Ludwigsburg. The quality of his stucco ornaments attracted even Goethe who would have liked to employ him in Weimar permanently. It was, however, not until 1798/99 that Isopi in fact was in Weimar for a temporary employment. He helped re-building the Weimar Castle.

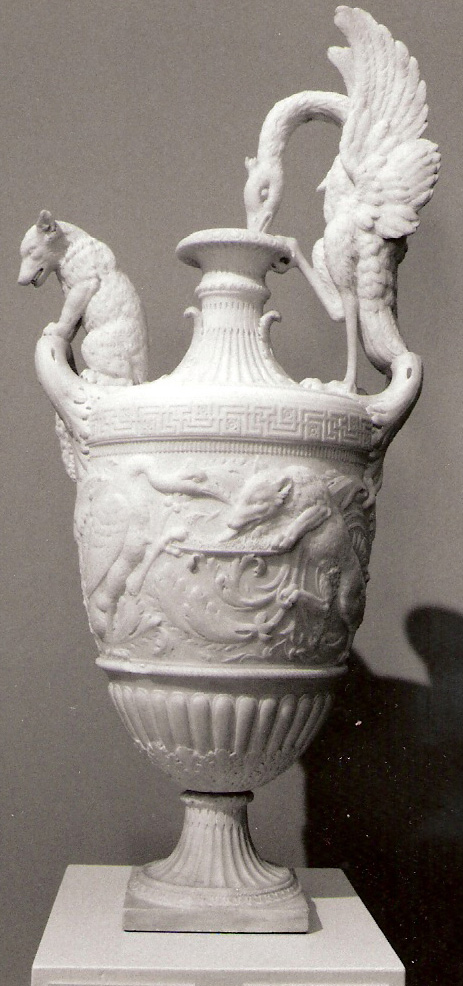
Decorative vase with fox and stork

Isopi found recognition of his talent for detailed stone sculpting of gorgeous vases and burial memorials in classicist style, as well as true-to-detail depiction of animals.
In 1810 Isopi started establishing an art school in Ludwigsburg, which was attached to the china manufacture. In creating decorative marble statues Isopi was unrivalled. He gained wide recognition for designing vases, urns, fountains, sepulchers or garden ornaments.

== Artists' School in Ludwigsburg ==
From 1809 till his death Isopi was mainly occupied in Ludwigsburg. His job as an instructor at the Artists' School (Künstlerinstitut), which he had founded himself in 1810, is particularly remarkable. He had to train junior staff for the attached china manufacture and provide models and templates for china and metal works of art. For a long time Isopi's school was the only educational institution in the field of art in the whole of Württemberg. However, King Wilhelm I had to close the institute in 1817 because of financial shortage due to the hunger years 1816/17 caused by the eruption of volcano Tambora in Indonesia.

== Stag and lion, Isopi’s most famous work ==
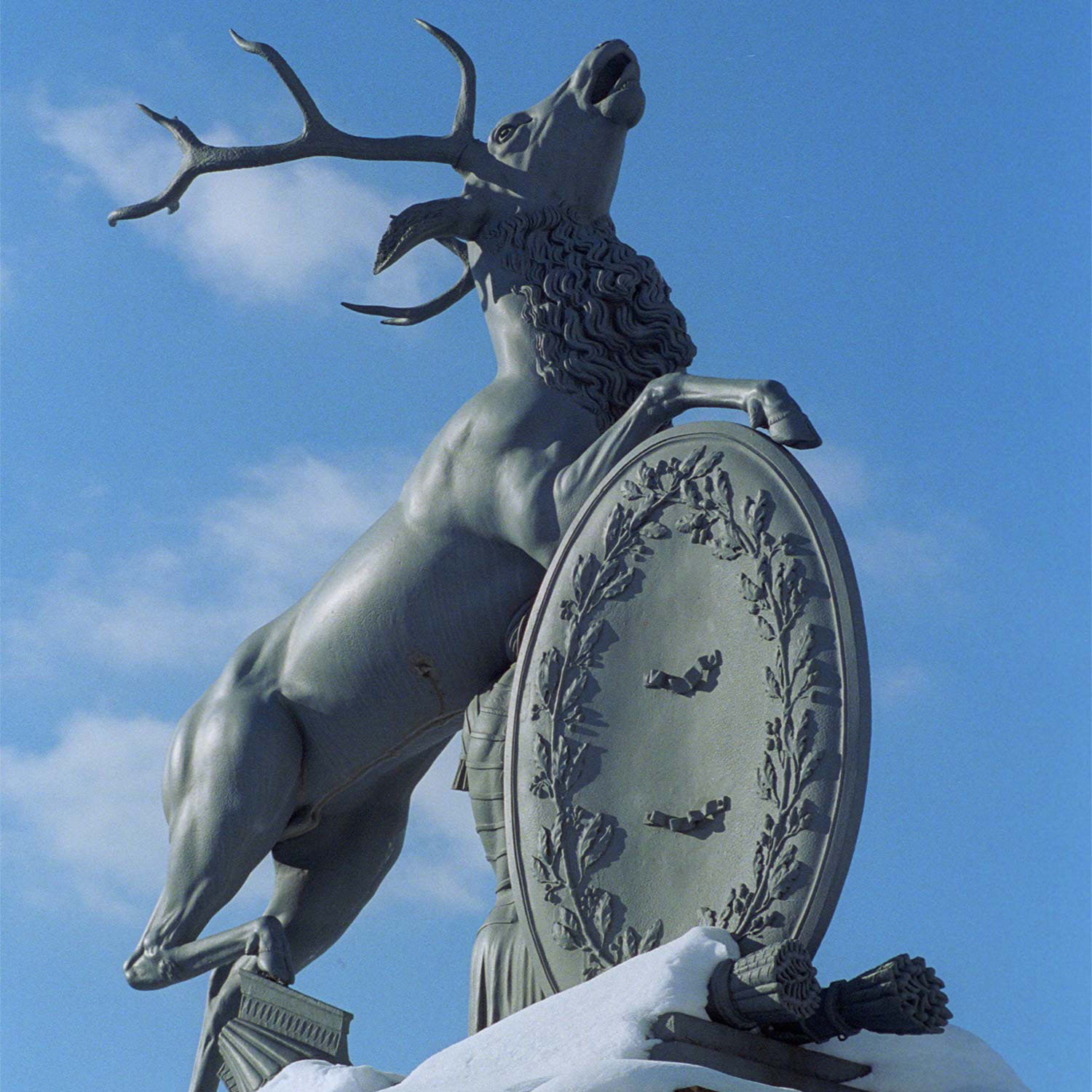
Stag

When, in 1806, Württemberg became a kingdom King Friedrich I commissioned his royal sculptor Isopi, who had been raised to knighthood, to create monumental sculptures of the two heraldic animals, stag and lion. New power required new demonstration of power. In a technically complicated procedure, after five years of experimenting and producing, Isopi, assisted by his pupil Ernst Mayer, succeeded in creating two huge sculptures, which were to be placed in front of the royal castle. It was a piece of pioneer work in iron casting.

== The Glyptothek of Ludwig I of Bavaria in Munich ==
Isopi was famous for his skill in restoring antique statues. This led to contacts with the Bavarian royal house. From 1818 to 1820 Isopi, accompanied by his pupil Ernst Mayer, restored antique statues for the Glyptothek in Munich which was built by Leo von Klenze for King Ludwig I.
