= Marienkapelle, Würzburg =

Marienkapelle
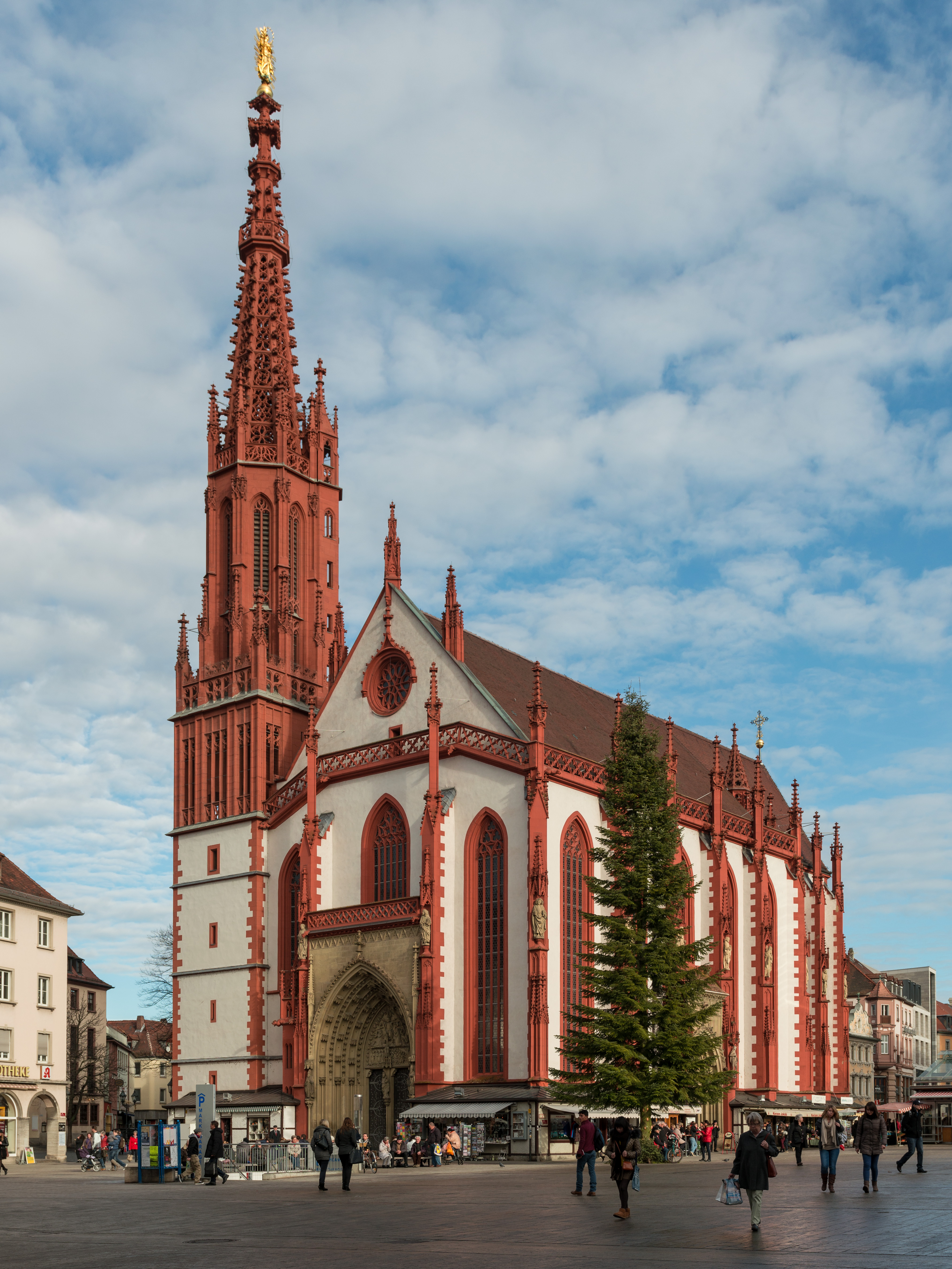

- Location within Bavaria Location within Germany
- 49°47′41″N 9°55′46″E
- Location: Marktplatz 7, Würzburg
- Country: Germany
- Denomination: Roman Catholic

Architecture
- Style: Gothic

Administration
- Diocese: Diocese of Würzburg
- Parish: Pfarreiengemeinschaft Würzburg-Innenstadt

The Marienkapelle is a Roman Catholic church located at the Unterer Markt (market square) of the town of Würzburg, Bavaria. It was built in the Gothic style in the 14th century. Despite its large size, it is a chapel by status, as it does not have a parish. Today it is administered by the united parishes of the Würzburg Cathedral and the Kollegiatstift Neumünster.

The chapel was heavily damaged by the Bombing of Würzburg in World War II and its interior was destroyed by flames. It was rebuilt in the 1950s and re-consecrated in 1962.

Its two best known works of art, the sculptures of Adam and Eve by Tilman Riemenschneider, are today located in the Mainfränkisches Museum and have been replaced in-situ by copies. The chapel is also the place of burial of noted Baroque architect Balthasar Neumann.

== History ==
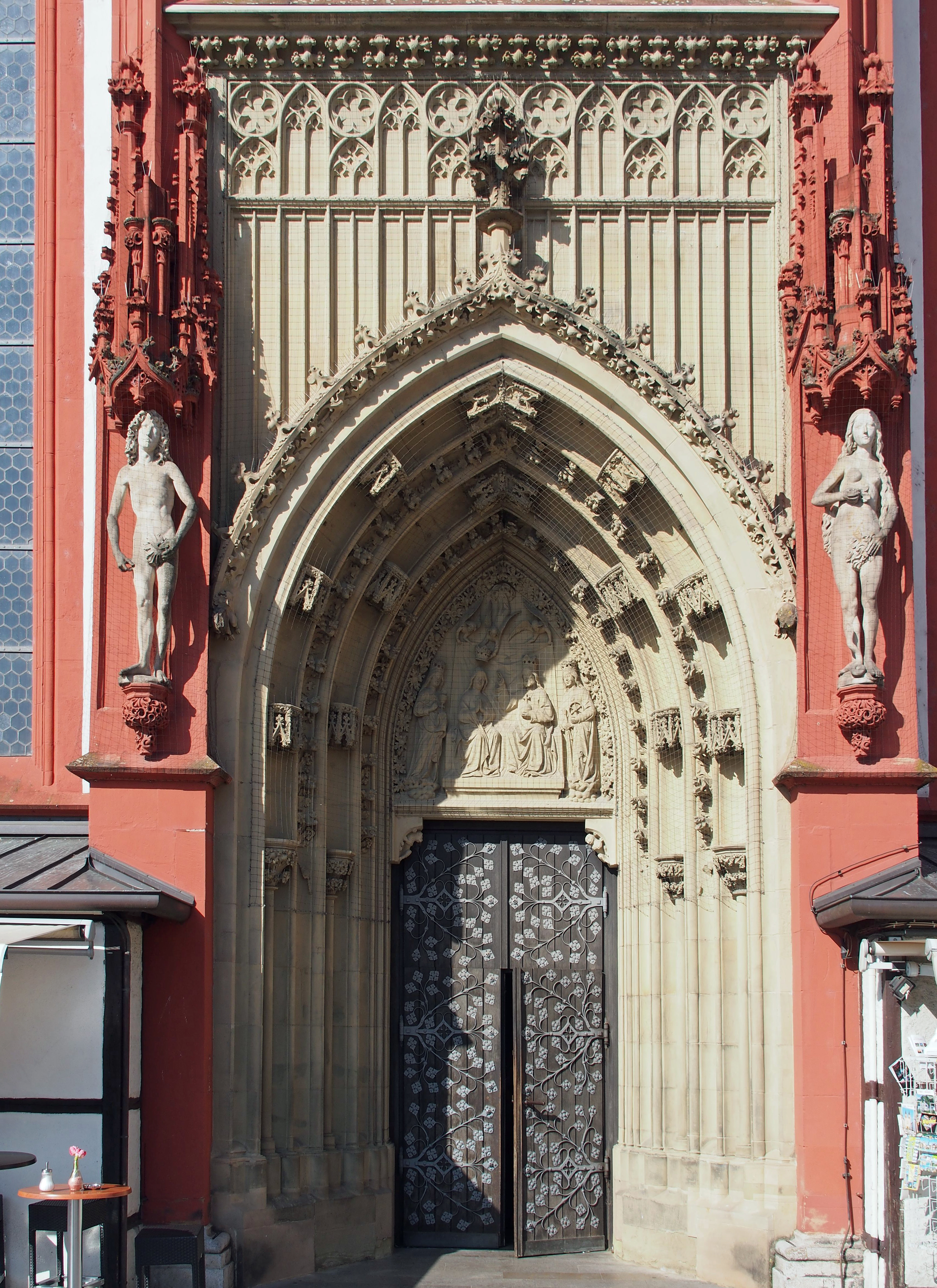
Southern portal with copies of Adam and Eve by Tilman Riemenschneider

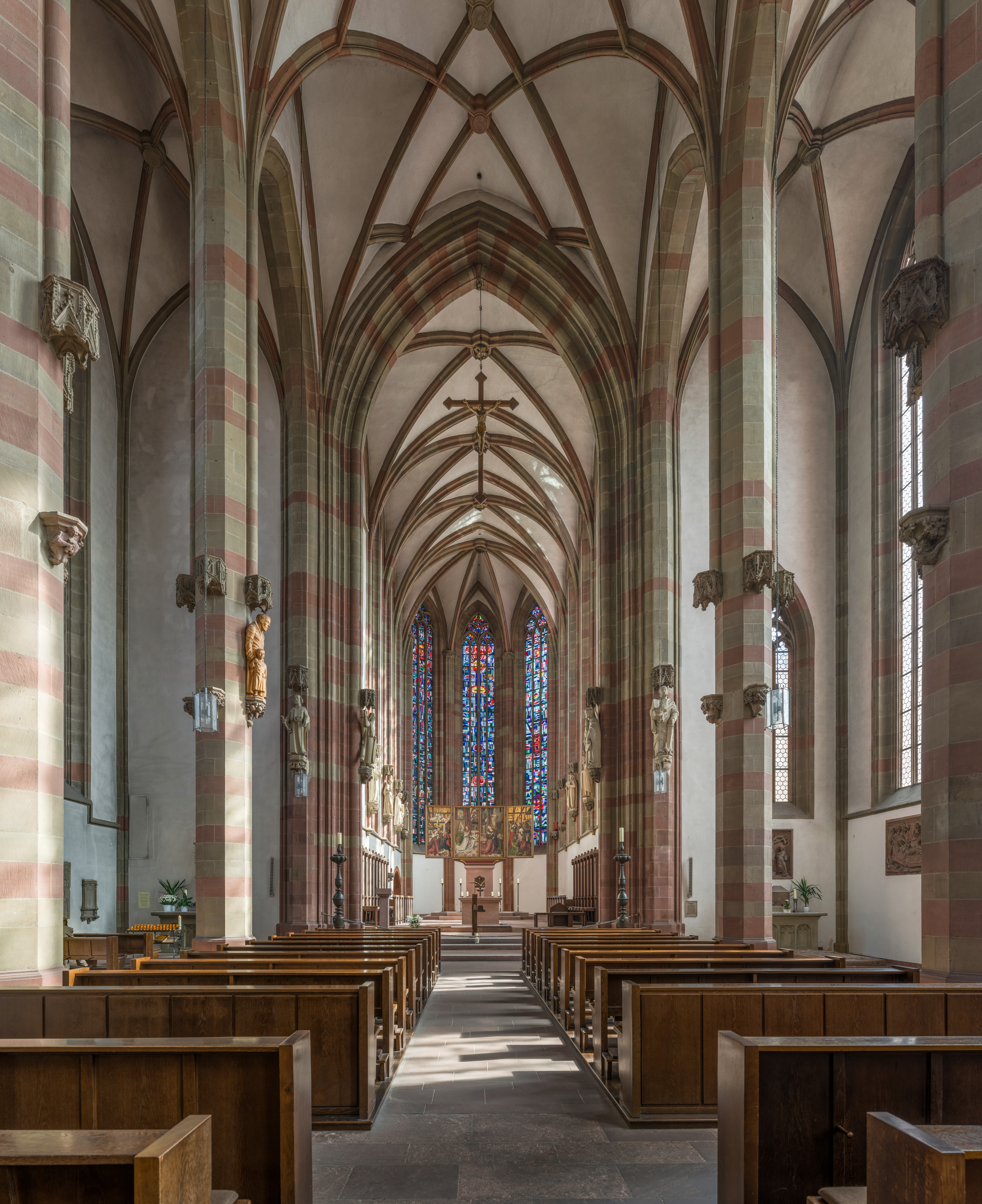
View down the nave towards the high altar

On 21 April 1349 the synagogue located at this site was destroyed in the course of a pogrom. There are conflicting reports about any (wooden) structures that were erected immediately after that and whether a pilgrimage was established at the site. It is also not known whether building a chapel dedicated to Mary there was intended as atonement for the murder of the local Jews or as atonement for having earlier tolerated the presence of Christ-killers. Construction of the current church started under Bishop Gerhard von Schwarzburg in 1377. It is not certain at what point in time the chapel was finished. The choir was reportedly consecrated in 1392. Burials at the site took place as early as 1411/2. By 1441 it must have been largely completed, as Bishop Sigismund von Sachsen, driven from the cathedral, used it as his church. That same year construction started on the tower, overseen by Eberhard Friedberger. The tower roof was added in 1479.

The Marienkapelle was no parish church, but records of its early history are sketchy. In 1393 the Fürspänger, a knightly society or order, claimed the chapel. In 1412, the order made a Benefice donation for the chapel and as late as the 17th century the chapel was referred to as a Ritter-Capelle (knights' chapel), e.g. in a drawing of the town by Matthäus Merian from 1648. However, there is also evidence that the Marienkapelle was a municipal chapel, under the control of the town council (or Rat). In 1415, the caretakers swore to be accountable to the council as well as to the bishop. Friedeberger was hired in 1441 by the town council and after 1446 this institution also appointed the caretakers. After 1478 the caretakers received a council wage. In 1452, the council decided that a Mass would be held here for each council member who died. At least from the mid-16th century, the council used the Marienkapelle as its chapel for formal occasions, foregoing use of the chapel inside the town hall, SS. Felix und Adauctus. In 1559 the Fürspänger tried in vain to stop the custom that council members were buried inside the chapel. Burial at this place seemed to have remained an honor bestowed by the Würzburg council on favored people, such as celebrated architect Balthasar Neumann, who was buried there following his death in 1753 (in an unmarked grave).

In the 1490s, the council asked Tilman Riemenschneider and his workshop to add sculptures of the Apostles to the interior columns. These were removed to a museum and to the cathedral in the mid-19th century. 19th-century copies replaced them. The original Riemenschneider statues St. Dorothea and St. Magaretha flanking the choir, however, were destroyed in 1945.

Later construction included 1556-8 work on the tower. The interior west gallery likely dates from 1616. In the early 18th century the roofs were renovated and the tower was topped by a Madonna, following the destruction of the original tower roof by lightning in 1711. A Baroque tower top was added by Josef Greising in 1719. Jakob van der Auwera designed the Madonna sculpture for the roof-top (1713) that was then made by goldsmith Martin Nötzel from copper and covered in gold (made from 400 gold ducats). In 1843-53 a major restoration was conducted by Andreas Halbig. This work included changes to the western façade and added the lower gallery and the rose window. In 1856-7, the Gothic Revival spire was added. At that time the gold cover on the Madonna was also restored.

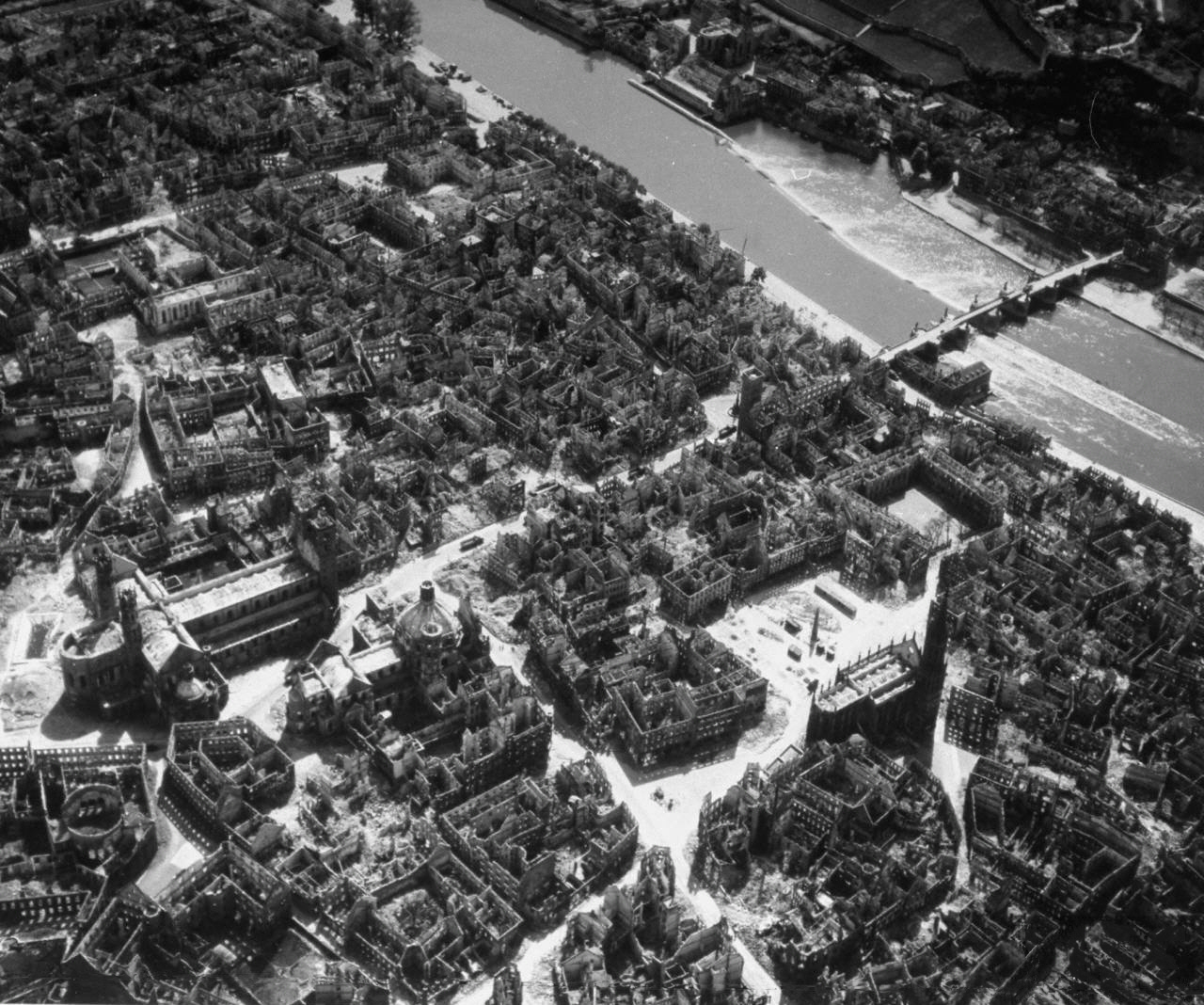
Marienkapelle (on the right) and the destroyed centre of Würzburg in 1945

The chapel was heavily damaged by Allied bombing in March 1945. Following earlier air raids, the church had been used to store furniture which now fueled the fire. The interior and the rafters were completely destroyed by fire. Later fighting added damage from artillery and aircraft fire. The Marienkapelle was rebuilt in 1948-61 and re-consecrated in 1962.

A major renovation took place in 1996-2003.

== Description ==
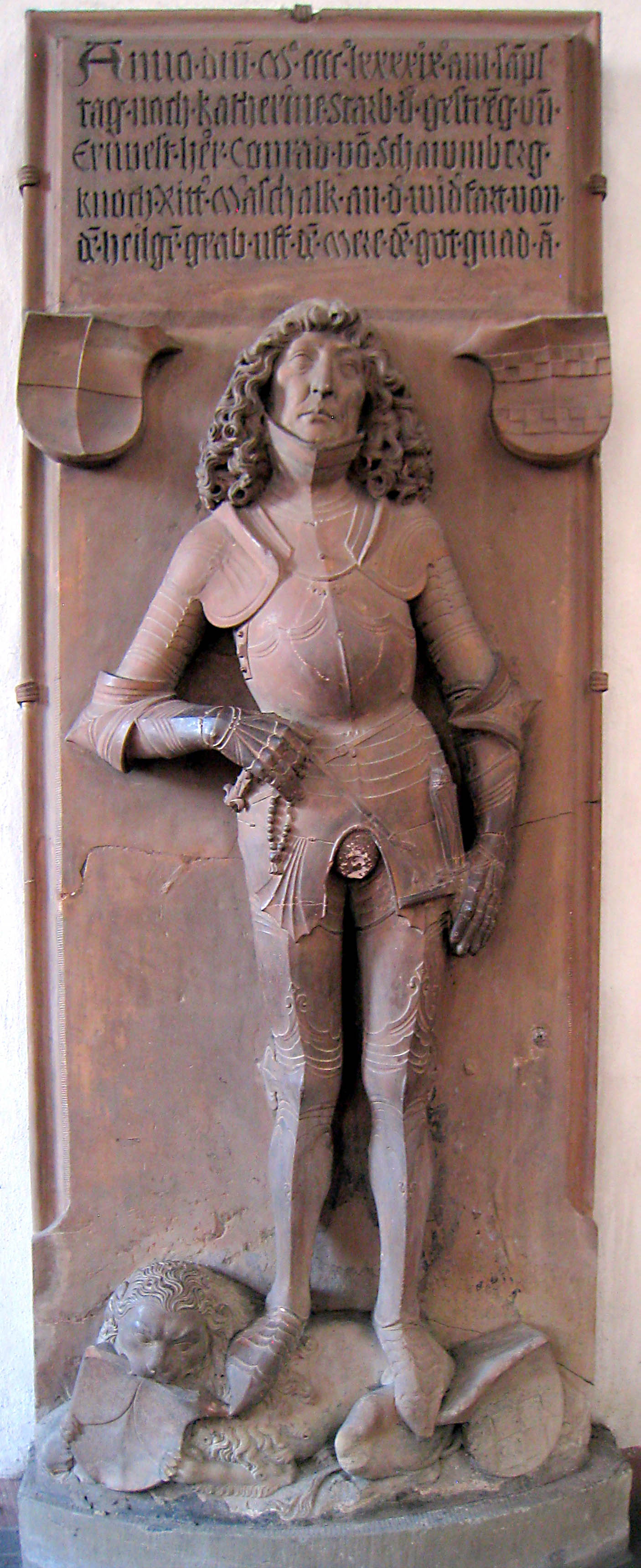
Tomb of Konrad von Schaumburg, by Tilman Riemenschneider

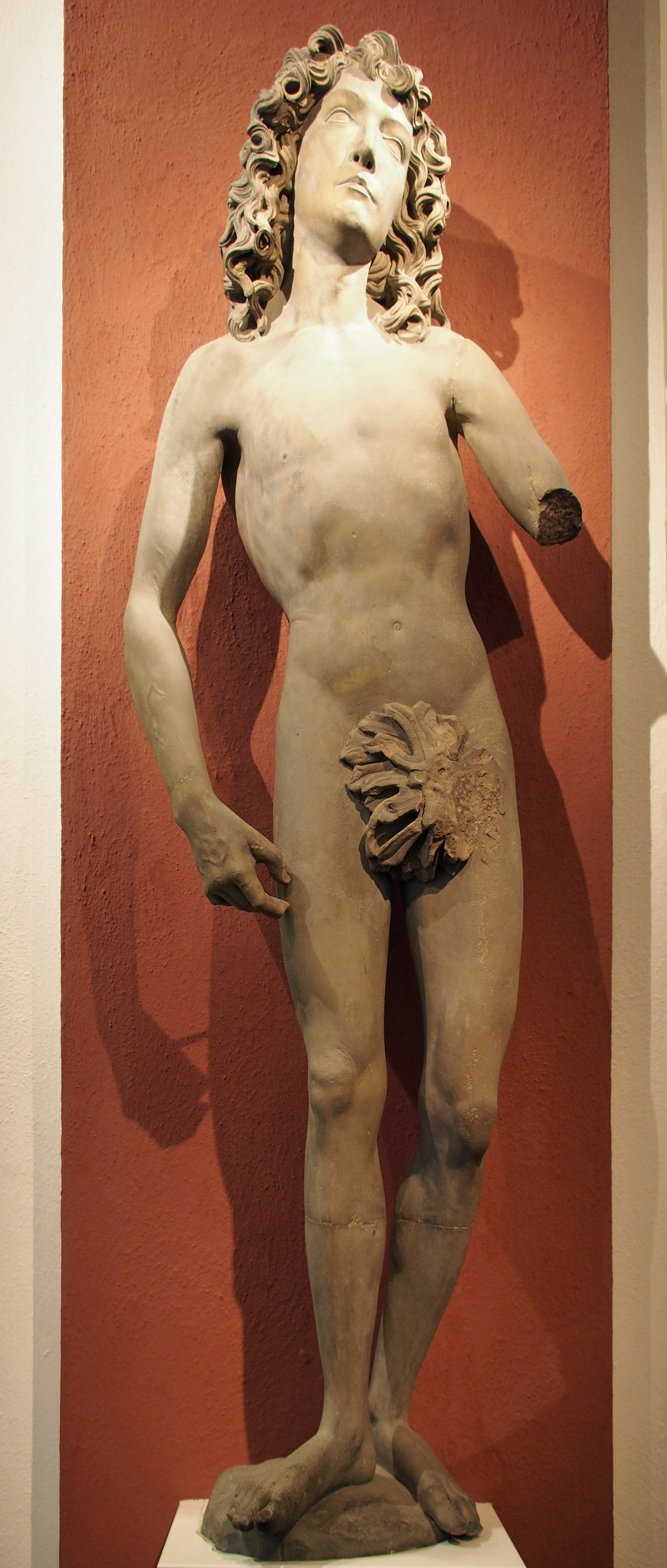
Original Adam by Riemenschneider, today in the museum at Marienberg Fortress.

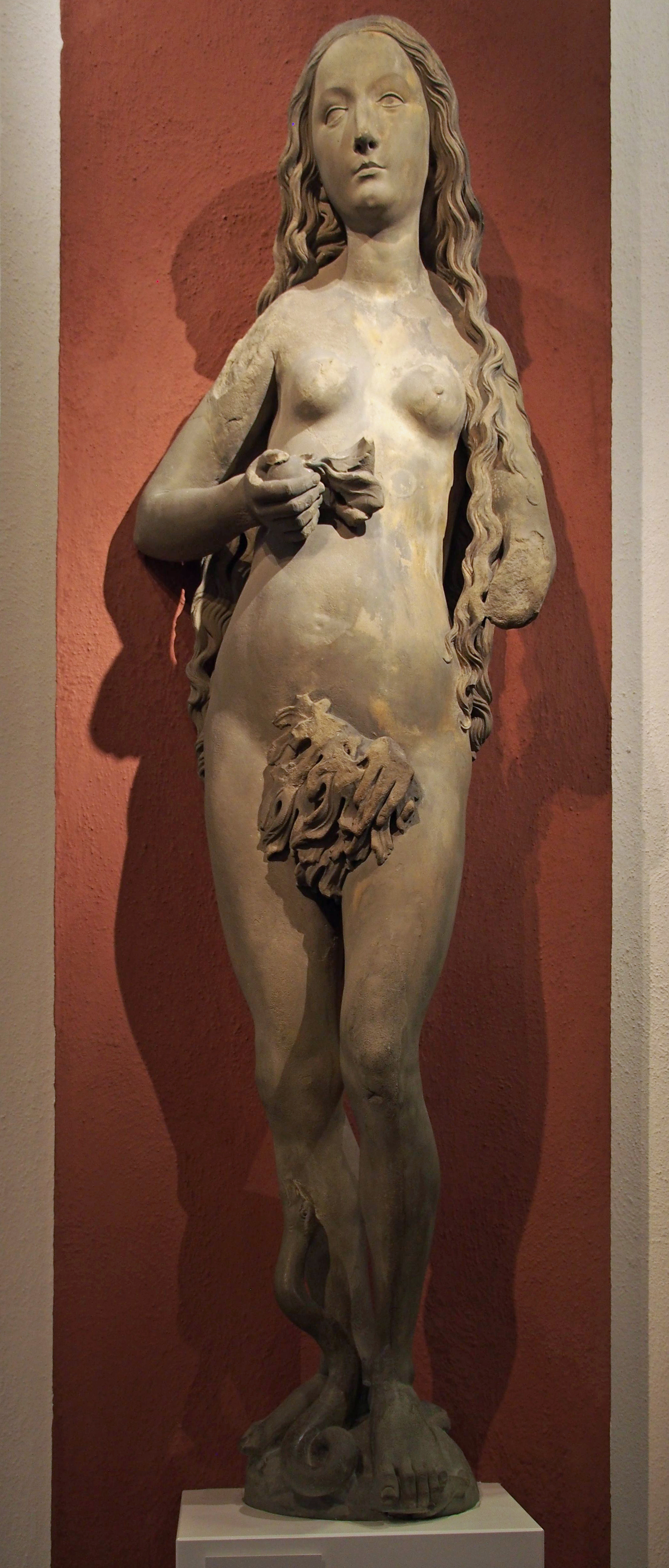
Original Eve by Riemenschneider

The chapel is a mixture between a basilica and a hall church that was popular in the late-Gothic period. It has three aisles and five bays. The middle aisle is only slightly higher than the side aisles. The roof rests on octagonal pillars. The eastern choir extends three bays. The proportions are somewhat skewed towards the vertical: on a plan of 26.5 meters by 18 meters the nave rises 21.5 meters in the center, 20 meters in the side aisles.

The church features three notable Gothic portals. The southern portal (Brautpforte) from 1430, is flanked by the sculptures of Adam and Eve. The tympanum shows the Coronation of the Virgin, with the Saints Barbara and Katharina. The western portal (Goldene Pforte), made after 1430, has a tympanum with the Last Judgment. The central pillar formerly held a stone Madonna (Schöne Madonna, ca. 1441) that is today located inside the church (replaced by a copy in its original setting). Finally, the northern portal from the early 15th century shows the Annunciation.

The Riemenschneider figures of Adam and Eve (delivered in 1493) were removed to the museum in 1894 (then the Luitpoldmuseum).

Most of the movable interior decoration was replaced in the Gothic Revival period in the 19th century and was destroyed in 1945. The current high altar (early 16th century) was brought here after the war from Neumünster; its previous provenance is not completely clear.

Although most of the sepulchral art was destroyed by the fire of 1945, the interior still features a number of tombs and epitaphs such as the epitaph for Jörg Schrimpf (d. 1556) by Peter Dell der Jüngere and the epitaph for Anna Külwein (d. 1563). Most notable is the grave of Konrad von Schaumburg (d. 1499) by Tilman Riemenschneider. This was ordered in 1500 and was originally colored, the armor was golden. This sculpture was also heavily damaged by fire in 1945 and restored after the war.

There was no contemporary monument for Balthasar Neumann, a key contributor to the design of Würzburg Residence, who was buried at the second column of the southern aisle. In the 1950s a bronze memorial plaque was added to commemorate him.

The top of the gold-covered Madonna crowning the tower rises 72 meters above the market square. Although it had survived the bombing of 16 March 1945 unharmed, it was subsequently damaged by repeated strafing from Allied aircraft during the fighting in the city. Post-war it was painstakingly reconstructed. Together with the globe at its feet, the statue measures 5.75 meters in height and weighs around 1,200 kg.
