= Johann Halbig =

German sculptor (1814–1882)

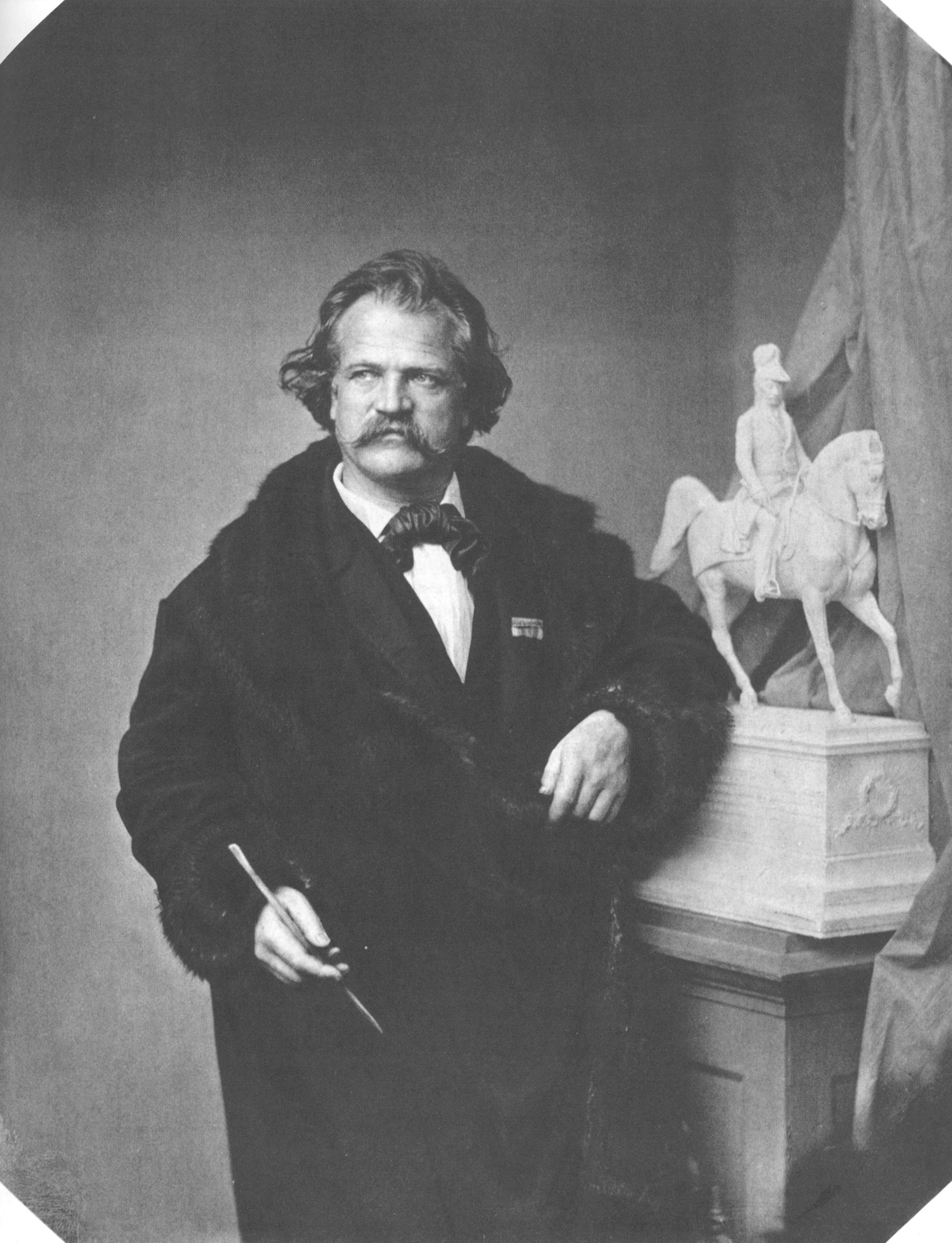
- Johann von Halbig
- Born: Johann Halbig; 13 July 1814; Donnersdorf, Kingdom of Bavaria
- Died: 29 August 1882 (aged 68); Munich, Kingdom of Bavaria, German Empire
- Known for: Sculpting
- Movement: Classicism

Johann Halbig (also Johann von Halbig) (13 July 1814 – 29 August 1882) was a German sculptor of the Classicism school.

== Biography ==
He was born at Donnersdorf in Lower Franconia and was educated at the Polytechnical School and at the Academy of Fine Arts in Munich. After the early death of his teacher and employer Ernst Mayer he became his successor as professor of sculpture at the Polytechnic School in Munich, where most of his works can be found. His work is characterized by its decorative quality. Johann Halbig died in Munich and was buried in the Alter Südfriedhof.

== Works ==
His most notable production was the colossal group of a quadriga and lions on the triumphal arch (1847). He also carved the lions of the Pinakothek and statues of Roma and Minerva in the palace gardens. He created 18 colossal statues representing the leading German provinces for the Befreiungshalle at Kelheim; 60 busts for the Pinakothek (Munich); a statue of King Maximilian II for Lindau (1854); a monument of Count Platen at Ansbach (1858); the monument of Marshal Cachahiba d'Argolo in Bahía, Brazil; a statue of King Ludwig I of Bavaria for Kelheim. Among his later works are a statue of Fraunhofer in Munich (1866); an equestrian statue of King William I of Württemberg for Cannstatt (1876); the "Emancipation" group of sculpture in New York (1867–1868); and the "Passion" group at Oberammergau (1875).

== Gallery ==
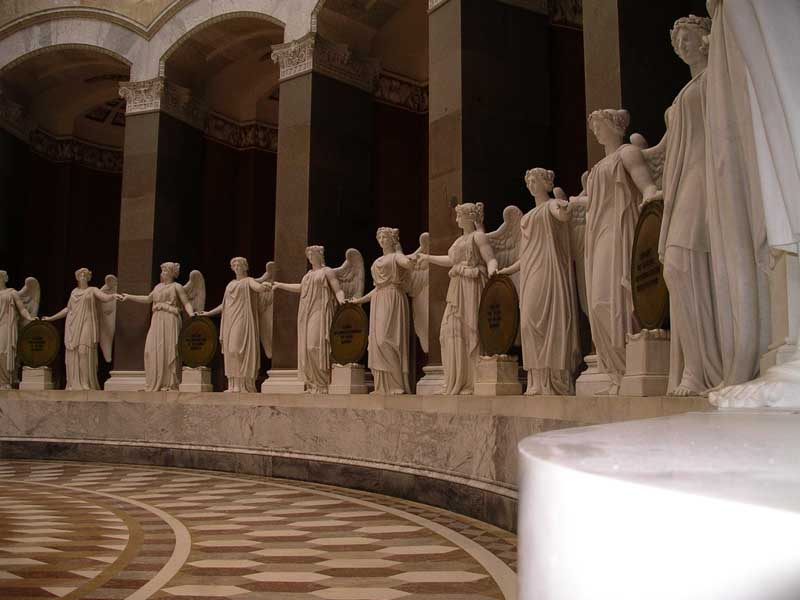
Hall of Liberty Kelheim

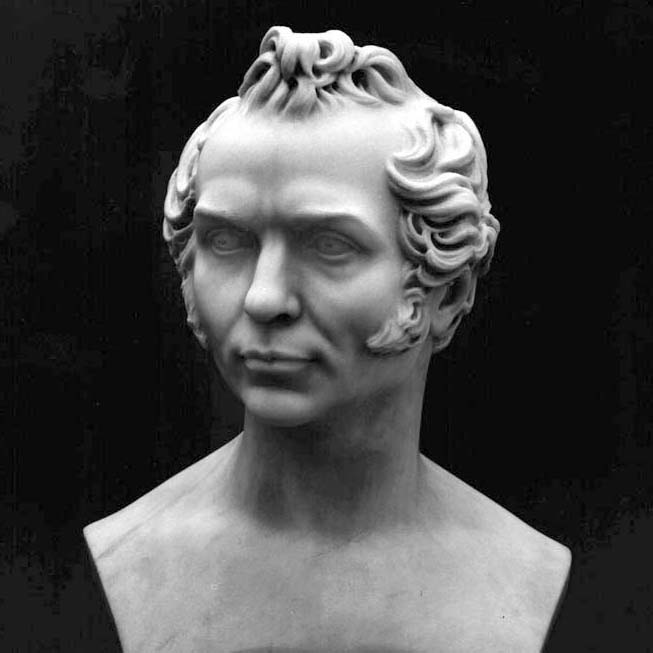
Bust of Halbig's teacher Ernst Mayer

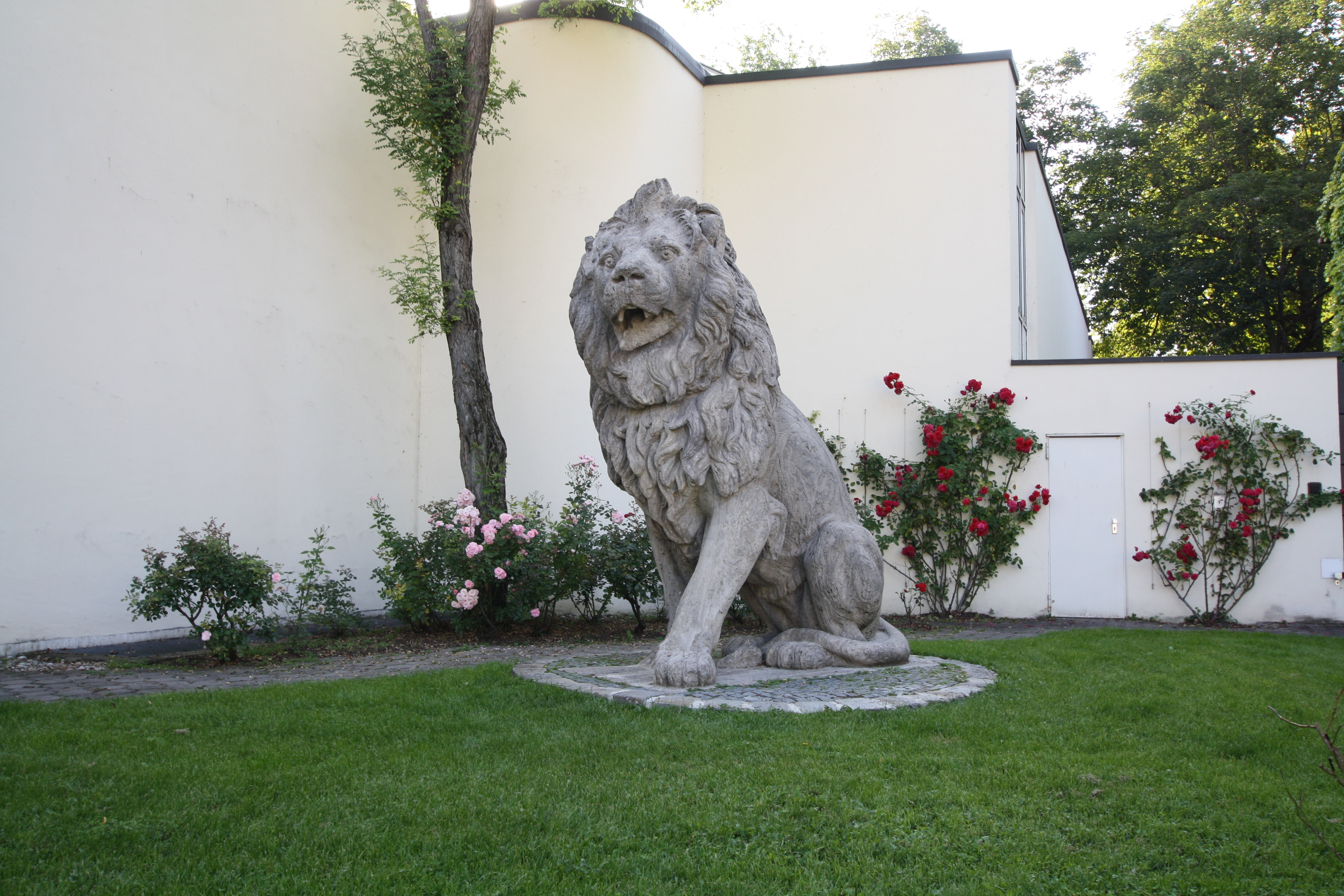
Lion in Munich

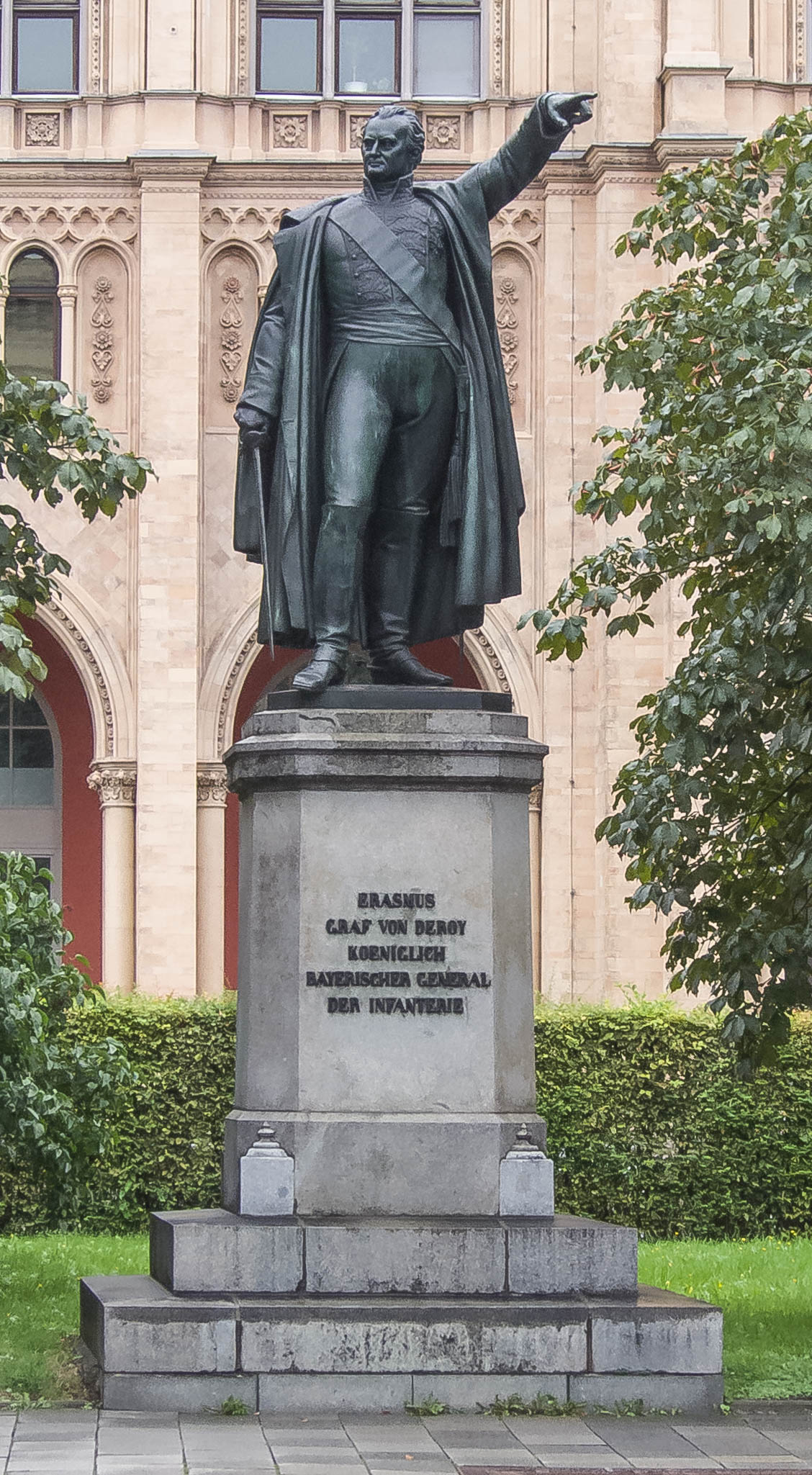
Bernhard Erasmus von Deroy, Royal Bavarian General of Infantry

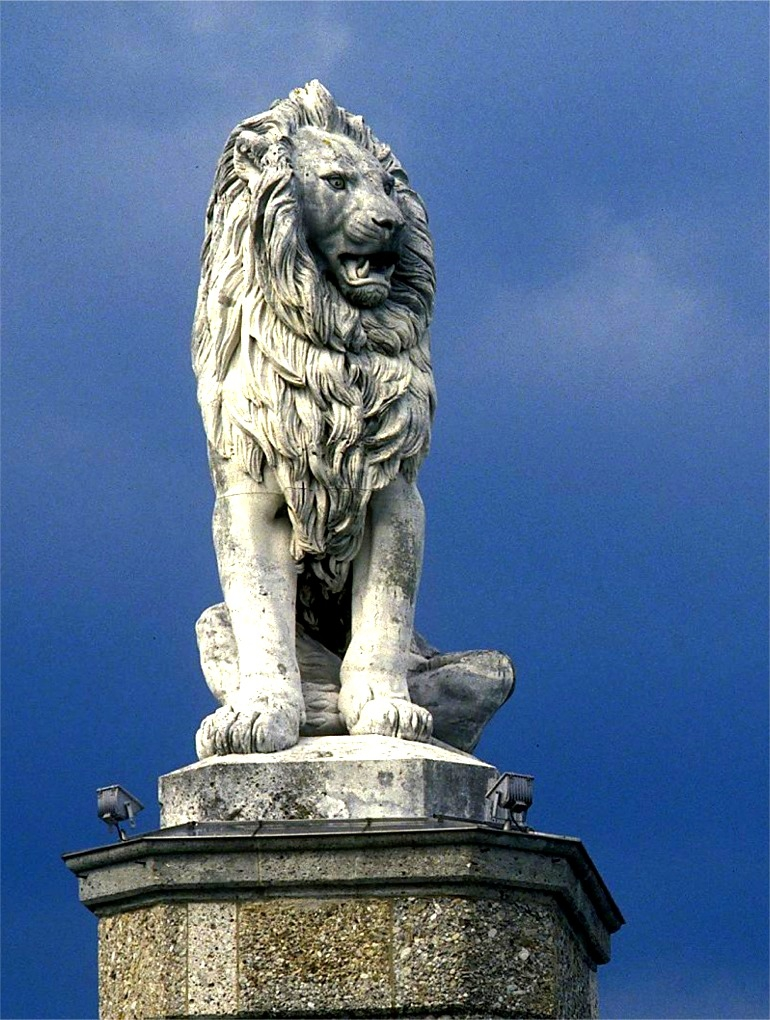
Halibig's lion at Lindau (Bodensee)

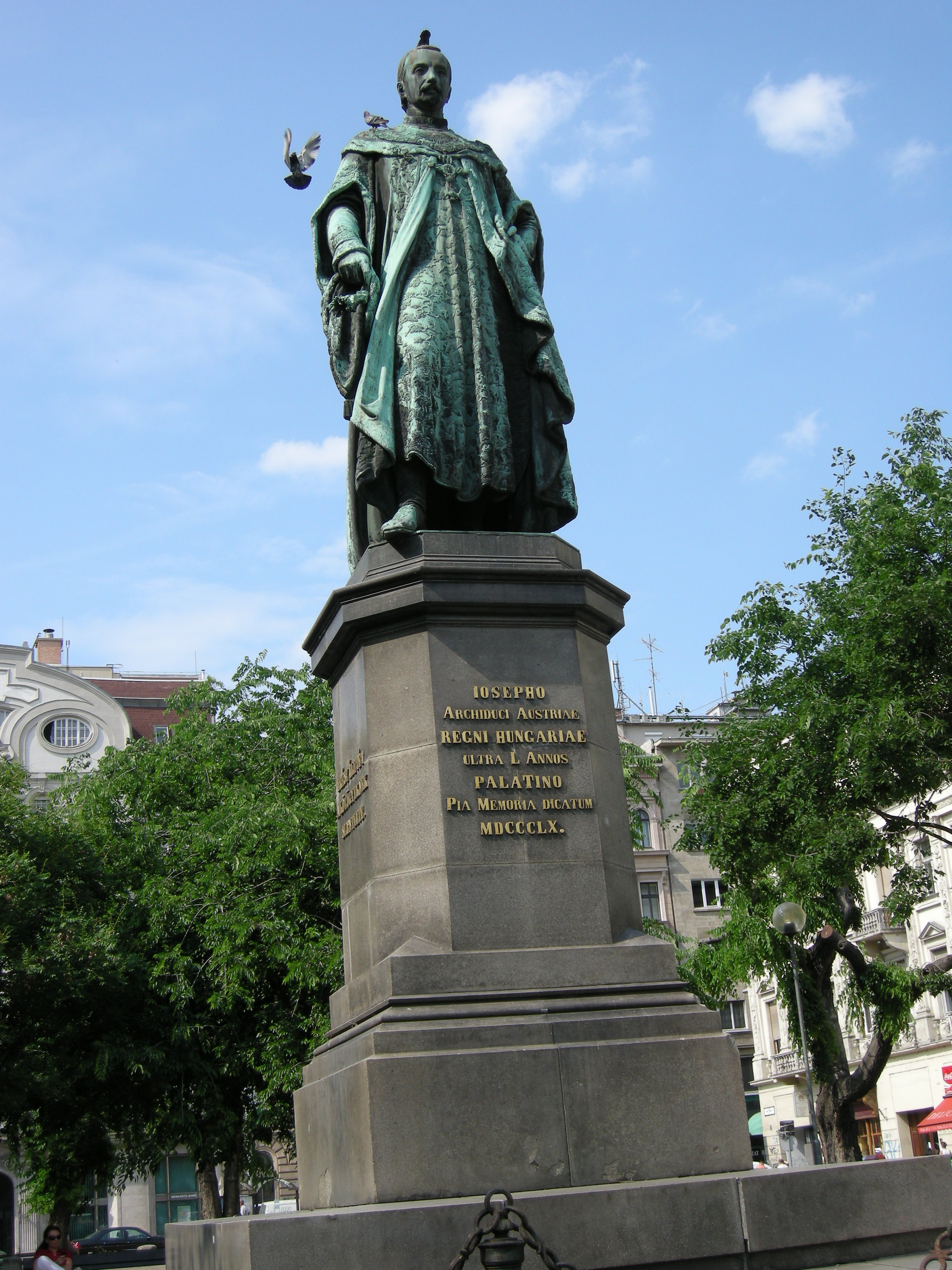
Budapest: statue of Archduke Joseph, Palatine of Hungary

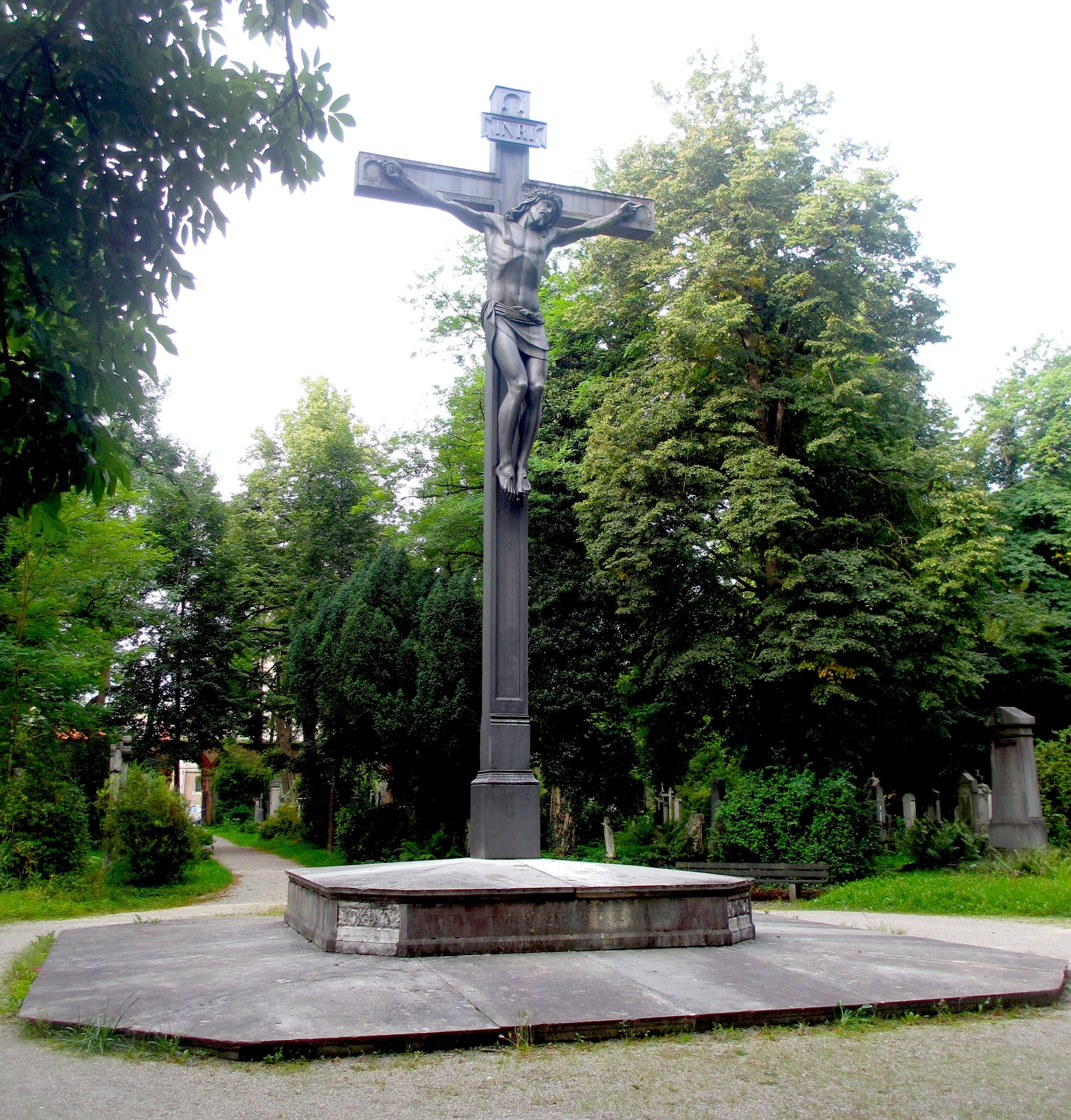
Crucifixion in bronze for centrum of Alter Südfriedhof (1850)

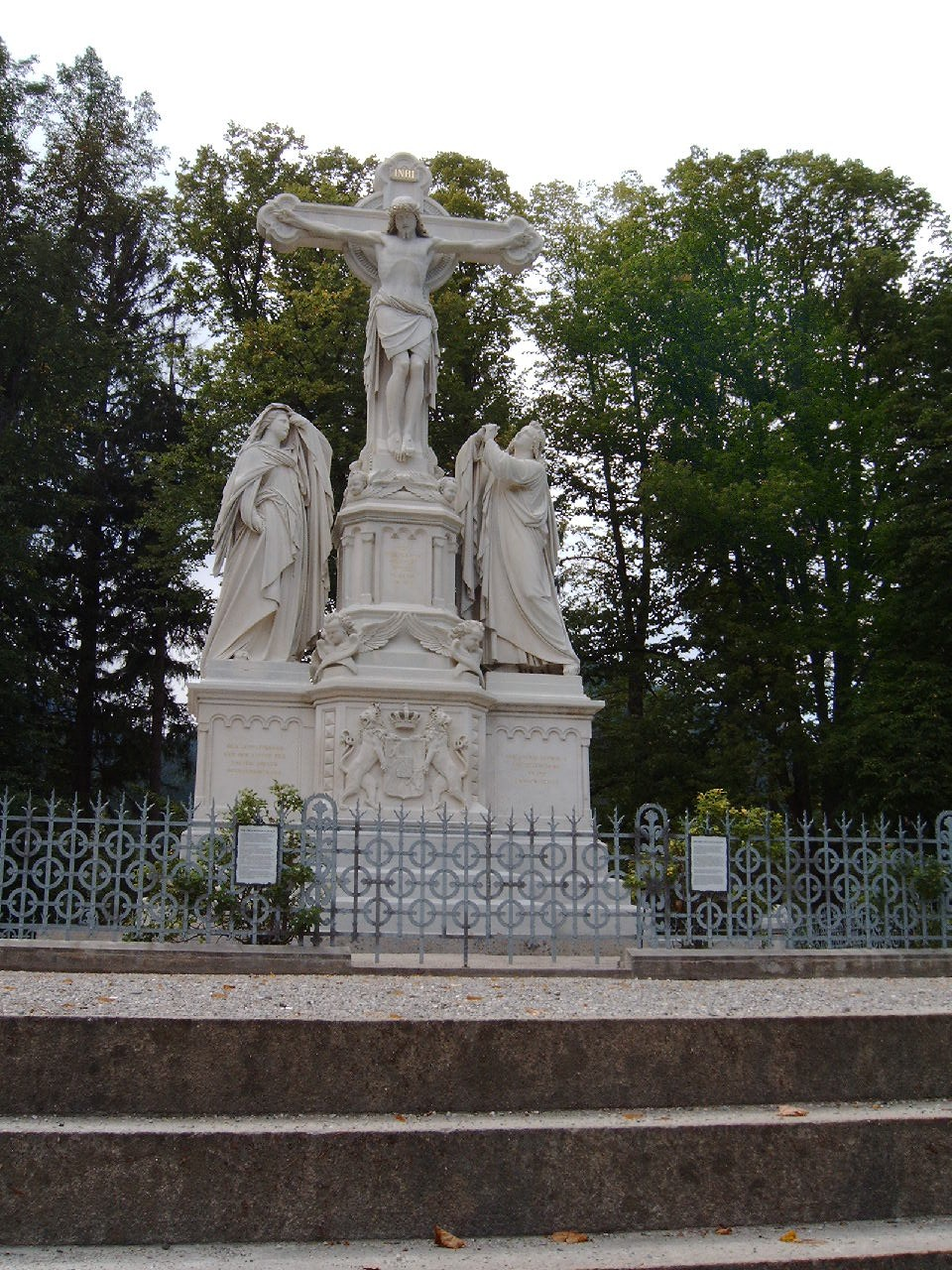
Colossal crucifixiongroup (12 m high) for Oberammergau commissioned by Ludwig II
