= Alejandro Próspero Révérend =

Physician

Alejandro Prospero Reverend (November 14, 1796 –December 1, 1881) was a French surgeon, doctor of Simon Bolivar from the arrival of the Venezuelan military and political leader to Santa Marta the night of December 1 of 1830 until his untimely death on 17 December 1830.
