= 1718 in music =

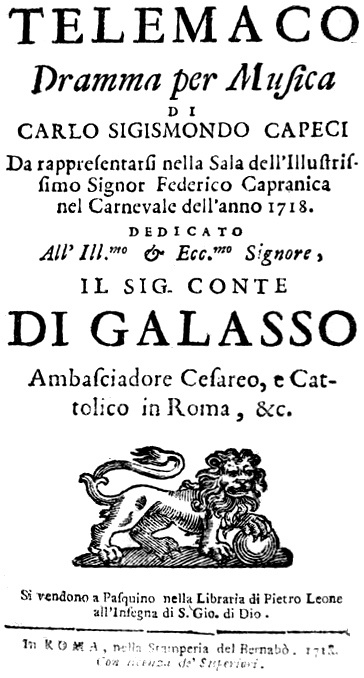
Alessandro Scarlatti, Telemaco, titlepage of the libretto, Rome, 1718

The year 1718 in music involved some significant events.

== Events ==
- Antonio Vivaldi tours Italy.
- Handel succeeds Johann Christoph Pepusch as Kapellmeister to the Duke of Chandos.
- Johann Joachim Quantz settles in Dresden.
- 14-year-old Carlos Seixas succeeds his father as organist at Coimbra Cathedral.

== Classical music ==
- Attilio Ariosti – Recueil de pièces
- William Babell – The Harpsichord Master Improved
- Johann Sebastian Bach
  - Lobet den Herrn, alle seine Heerscharen, BWV Anh.5
  - Herr Christ, der einge Gottessohn, BWV Anh.77
  - Der Himmel dacht auf Anhalts Ruhm und Glück, BWV 66a
  - Die Zeit, die Tag und Jahre macht, BWV 134a
  - Weichet nur, betrübte Schatten, BWV 202
  - Amore traditore, BWV 203
  - Vom Himmel hoch, da komm ich her, BWV 738
  - Violin Concerto in E major, BWV 1042
  - Concerto for 2 Violins in D minor, BWV 1043
  - Sinfonia in F major, BWV 1046a
  - Brandenburg Concerto No. 2 in F major, BWV 1047 (likely composed)
  - Brandenburg Concerto No. 3 in G major, BWV 1048
  - Orchestral Suite No. 1 in C major, BWV 1066
- Antonio Caldara – Il martirio di San Terenziano
- Pietro Castrucci – 12 Violin Sonatas, Op. 1
- Francesco Bartolomeo Conti – Amore in Tessaglia
- Jean-François Dandrieu – Les caractères de la guerre
- Johann Ernst Prinz von Sachsen-Weimar – 6 Violin Concertos, Op. 1
- Christoph Graupner – 8 Partitas
- George Frideric Handel
  - Esther (oratorio) HWV 50a
  - Dolc' è pur d'amor l'affanno, HWV 109b
  - L'aure grate, il fresco rio, HWV 121a
  - As Pants the Hart, HWV 251b
- Francesco Manfredini – 12 Concertos, Op. 3 (inc. No. 12 in C major "Christmas Pastorale")
- Pierre Danican Philidor
  - 4 Suites, Op. 2
  - 3 Suites, Op. 3
- Georg Philipp Telemann
  - 6 Suonatine per violino e cembalo (TWV 41)
  - 6 Trio Sonatas (TWV 42)
  - Concerto for 2 Recorders, TWV 52:a2
- Antonio Vivaldi – Qual in pioggia dorata, RV 686
- Giovanni Zamboni – Sonate d'intavolatura di leuto, Op. 1
- Jan Dismas Zelenka
  - Capriccio in G major, ZWV 183
  - Capriccio in F major, ZWV 184
  - Collectaneorum Musicorum, Book II (compilation of Poglietti and Frescobaldi scores compiled during Zelenka's time in Vienna)

== Opera ==
- Toussaint Bertin de la Doué – Le Jugement de Paris
- Antonio Maria Bononcini – Griselda
- Giuseppe Antonio Brescianello – Tisbe, Premiered Jan. 26 in Stuttgart
- Antonio Caldara – Ifigenia in Aulide
- George Frideric Handel – Acis and Galatea HWV 49
- Nicola Porpora – Berenice regina d'Egitto
- Domenico Natale Sarro – Arsace
- Alessandro Scarlatti
  - Cambise, R.356.64
  - Il trionfo dell'onore
  - Telemaco
- Gottfried Heinrich Stölzel – Diomedes (inc. aria "Bist du bei mir", later arranged by J.S. Bach as BWV 508)
- Antonio Vivaldi
  - Armida al campo d'Egitto, RV 699
  - Scanderbeg, RV 732
  - Tito Manlio, RV 738

== Theoretical Writings ==
- Jean-François Dandrieu – Principes de l'Acompagnement du Clavecin

== Births ==
- January 18 – Christoph Ludwig Fehre, organist and composer (died 1772)
- April 14 – Emanuele Barbella, Italian composer and violinist (died 1777)
- August 9 – Placidus von Camerloher, German composer (died 1782)
- September 25 – Nicola Conforto, composer (died 1793)
- November 8 – Joseph Aloys Schmittbaur, composer (died 1809)
- November 21 – Friedrich Wilhelm Marpurg, music critic and composer (died 1795)
- date unknown
  - Wenzel Raimund Birck, composer (died 1763)
  - Mademoiselle Duval (nom de plume) (died c.1775)
  - Richard Mudge, composer (died 1763)
  - Giuseppe Scarlatti (or 1723), composer (died 1777)
- December 3 – Richard Duke, violin maker (died 1783)

== Deaths ==
- February 27 – Václav Karel Holan Rovenský, composer (born 1644)
- March – Richard Brind, organist and composer
- March 13 – Friedrich Nicolaus Brauns, composer (born 1637)
- April 1 – Johann Burchard Freystein, hymn writer (born 1671)
- November 26 – Bernardo Sabadini, opera composer
