= Griselda (disambiguation) =

Griselda is a feminine given name.

Griselda may also refer to:

== Operas ==
- Griselda (Antonio Maria Bononcini), a 1718 opera
- Griselda (Giovanni Bononcini), a 1722 opera
- Griselda (A. Scarlatti), a 1721 opera by Alessandro Scarlatti
- Griselda (Vivaldi), a 1735 opera by Antonio Vivaldi
- Griselda, a 1701 opera libretto by Apostolo Zeno
- Griselda, a 1701 opera by Antonio Pollarolo, the first setting
- Griselda, a 1723 opera by Pietro Torri
- Griselda, a 1725 opera by Francesco Conti
- Griselda, a 1798 opera by Ferdinando Paer

== Other uses ==
- Griselda (folklore), a figure of medieval storytelling noted for patience and obedience
- Griselda Records, American hip hop collective and record label
- Griselda (miniseries), a Netflix show based on the life of Griselda Blanco
- "Griselda", a song from the 1976 album Have Moicy! by Peter Stampfel
