= Don Chisciotte in Sierra Morena =

- Opera by Francesco Bartolomeo Conti
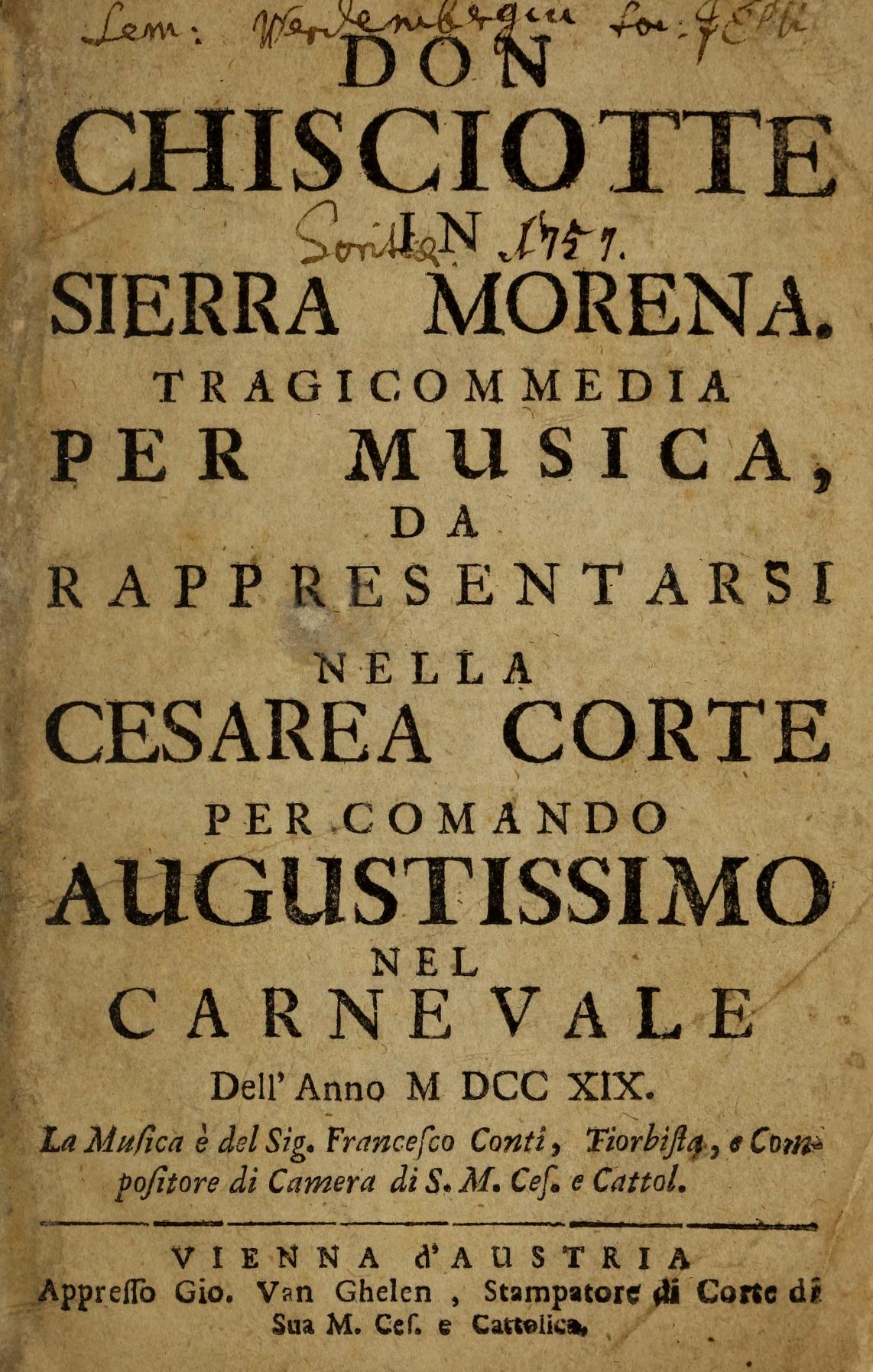
- Title page of the libretto (published for the premiere performance)
- Librettist: Apostolo Zeno; Pietro Pariati
- Based on: Don Quixote by Cervantes
- Premiere: 6 February 1719; Hoftheater, Vienna

Don Chisciotte in Sierra Morena is a tragicomic opera in five acts composed by Francesco Bartolomeo Conti to an Italian libretto by Apostolo Zeno and Pietro Pariati. The libretto is based on the episodes set in the Sierra Morena mountains of Spain in Book I of the Miguel de Cervantes novel Don Quixote. The opera premiered on 6 February 1719 at the Hoftheater in Vienna and proved to be one of Conti's most successful ones. It has had several revivals in modern times beginning in 1987 at the Buxton Festival.

== Background and performance history ==
The opera's librettists, Apostolo Zeno and Pietro Pariati, had written the librettos for many of Conti's Vienna operas, either individually or jointly. On this occasion they remained quite faithful to the text and basic story recounted Book I of Don Quixote where he travels to the Sierra Morena mountains and has a series of encounters with the wily inhabitants and two pairs of unhappy lovers. Described in the libretto as a tragicomedia per musica (tragicomedy in music), it is essentially a parody of the opera seria genre and its heroic arias.

Don Chisciotte in Sierra Morena premiered at 6 February 1719 at the court theatre of Charles VI, Holy Roman Emperor in Vienna. The title role was sung by Francesco Borosini, who created the leading tenor and baritone roles in many of Conti's operas. Although generally described as a tenor, Borosini had an extraordinarily wide vocal range spanning bass to tenor. Conti's wife, Maria Landini, sang the lead soprano role of Lucinda. The staging was designed by Giuseppe Galli Bibiena. The production also included two comic intermedi following Acts 2 and 4 and three ballets with music by Nicola Matteis, the Younger—Dance of the Peasants (at the end of Act 1), Dance of the Puppeteers (at the end of Act 3), and Dance of the Servants (at the end of Act 5).

The opera was an immediate success and was performed 25 times in Vienna between its premiere and 1737. It also had performances in Braunschweig in 1720, 1721, and 1738 and in Hamburg in 1720 and 1722. A shortened form of the libretto was used for a set of intermedi performed in Spain in 1728 and an anonymous libretto published in Germany in 1739 as Amor medico, o sia Don Chisciotte draws heavily on Zeno and Pariati's work. It is not known if the latter was ever performed.

The opera's first performance in modern times was at the Buxton Festival in 1987, where it was sung in English translation with Neill Archer in the title role. It was staged again at the 1992 Innsbruck Festival of Early Music with René Jacobs conducting and Nicolas Rivenq in the title role. On that occasion it was performed in the original Italian but like the Buxton production it was heavily cut. It has had several revivals since then, both staged and in concert version, including a fully staged production at the Caramoor Festival in 2004.

== Roles ==
Role	Voice type (Note: The voice types here are those used in 21st century performances. The original production made extensive use of castrati.)	Premiere cast 6 February 1719
Don Chisciotte (Don Quixote)	tenor	Francesco Borosini
Sancio (Sancho Panza), Don Chisciotte's squire	bass	
Fernando, an Andalusian prince, in love with Lucinda	castrato alto	
Cardenio, a young knight, also in love with Lucinda	castrato alto	
Dorotea, in love with Fernando	soprano	
Lucinda, in love with Cardenio	soprano	Maria Landini
Lope, Don Chisciotte's friend and relative	tenor	
Ordogno, a young man, Lope's companion	soprano	
Rigo, the barber	castrato	
Mendo, owner of the hotel in the Sierra Morena	baritone	
Maritorne, Mendo's servant woman	mezzo-soprano	
Pages, soldiers, hotel servants, officers of the law

== Synopsis ==
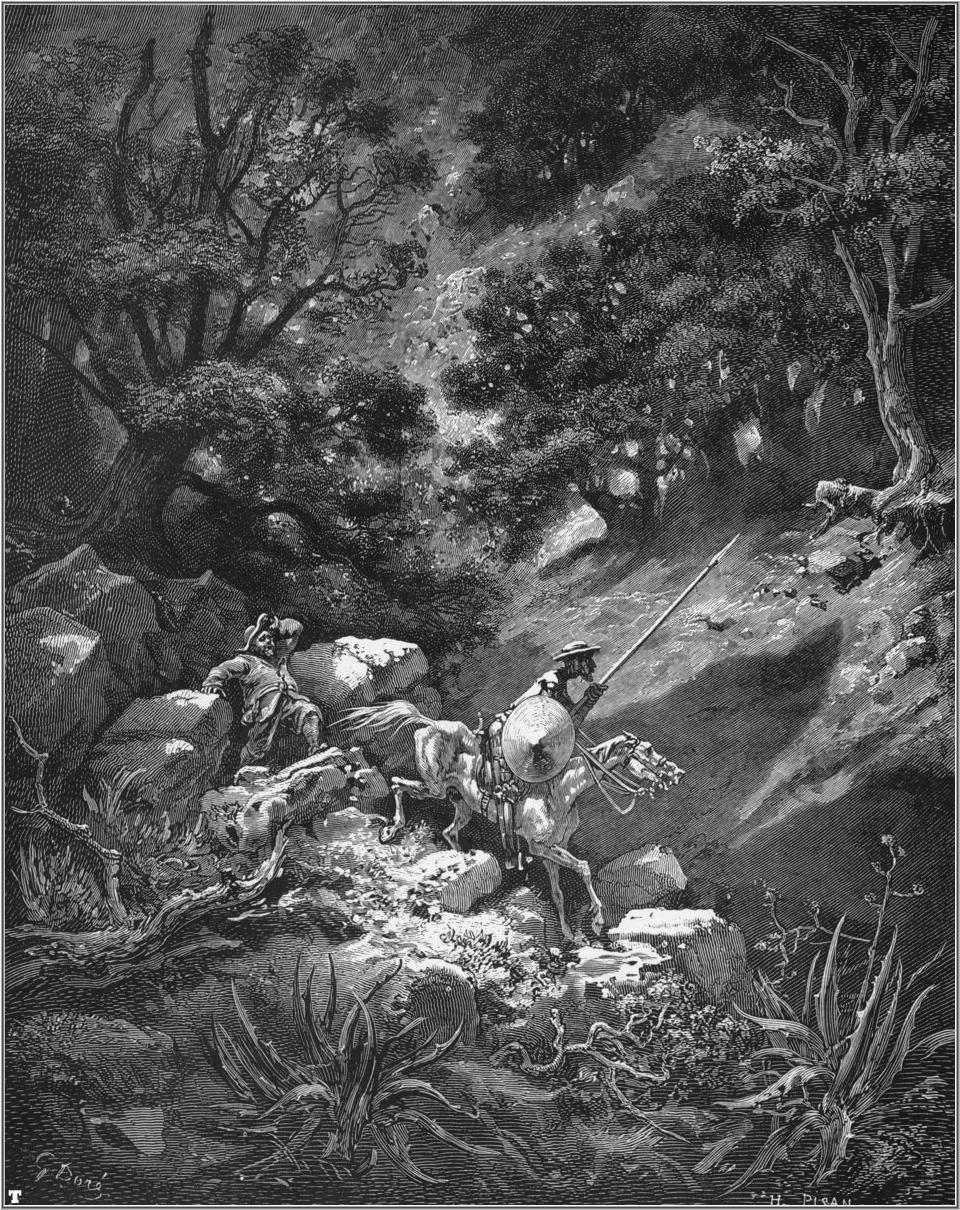
Doré's illustration of Don Chisciotte and Sancio in the Sierra Morena

Setting: The woods and a local inn in the Sierra Morena mountains of Spain during the 17th century.

Act 1

Don Chisciotte and Sancio are travelling through the Sierra Morena mountains. In the woods they encounter a rocky clearing with a cave and a fountain in front of it. It is the home of the young knight Cardenio who gone mad after his best friend Fernando stole his beloved Lucinda. Cardenio first attacks Sancio and then Don Chisciotte who he thinks is Fernando. Still pining for his idealized love Dulcinea, Don Chisciotte decides that he too should become mad from love and begins to act out scenes from Orlando Furioso. Don Chisciotte's friend Lope arrives with his companion Ordogno. They want to bring the Don home and convince Sancho to help them by making Don Chisciotte believe that Dulcinea is pining for him and wants him to return. Dorotea, who had been betrothed to Fernando before he fell in love Lucinda. laments his perfidy. However, Lope tells her that Lucinda had managed to escape from Fernando before the marriage could take place. Overjoyed, Dorotea and Cardenio promise to help Lope and Ordogno in their plan to bring Don Chisciotte home. The act ends with a dance of the Sierra Morena peasants.

Act 2

Fernando's guards have found Lucinda. He once again asks her to marry him but she refuses. Alone, Don Chisciotte sings of his love for Dulcinea and how he much he is suffering from their separation. Sancio arrives and recounts how with the aid of magic he was able to fly to Dulcinea who told him that she wants only one thing—Don Chisciotte's return. Lope confirms Sancio's story. Dorotea then appears disguised as the "Queen of Micomicona" accompanied by her "squire" (Ordogno in disguise) and her "tutor" (Cardenio in disguise). She asks Don Chisciotte's help to regain her throne which has been usurped by the giant "Pandafilando". The road to "Micomicona" will pass through Don Chisciotte's homeland, La Mancha. As a gesture of thanks for his help and a token of her "love", she will make him the lord of La Mancha. Don Chisciotte promises her his help but not his love. At a nearby inn, Sancio encounters the serving woman Maritorne who tries to seduce him, but he rejects her advances.

Act 3

Cardenio rejoices in his reunion with Lucinda but she urges caution. Still a prisoner of Fernando, she plans to escape that night. At the inn, Don Chisciotte meets Rigo the barber. He mistakes Rigo's shaving bowl for the magic helmet of Mambrino (a character in Orlando Furioso) and steals it. Rigo vows revenge. Mendo, the innkeeper, presents a puppet show involving a royal couple pursued by Moors. Don Chisciotte, upset by the couple's impending death, takes out his sword and cuts the heads off all the puppets. The act ends with a dance of the puppeteers.

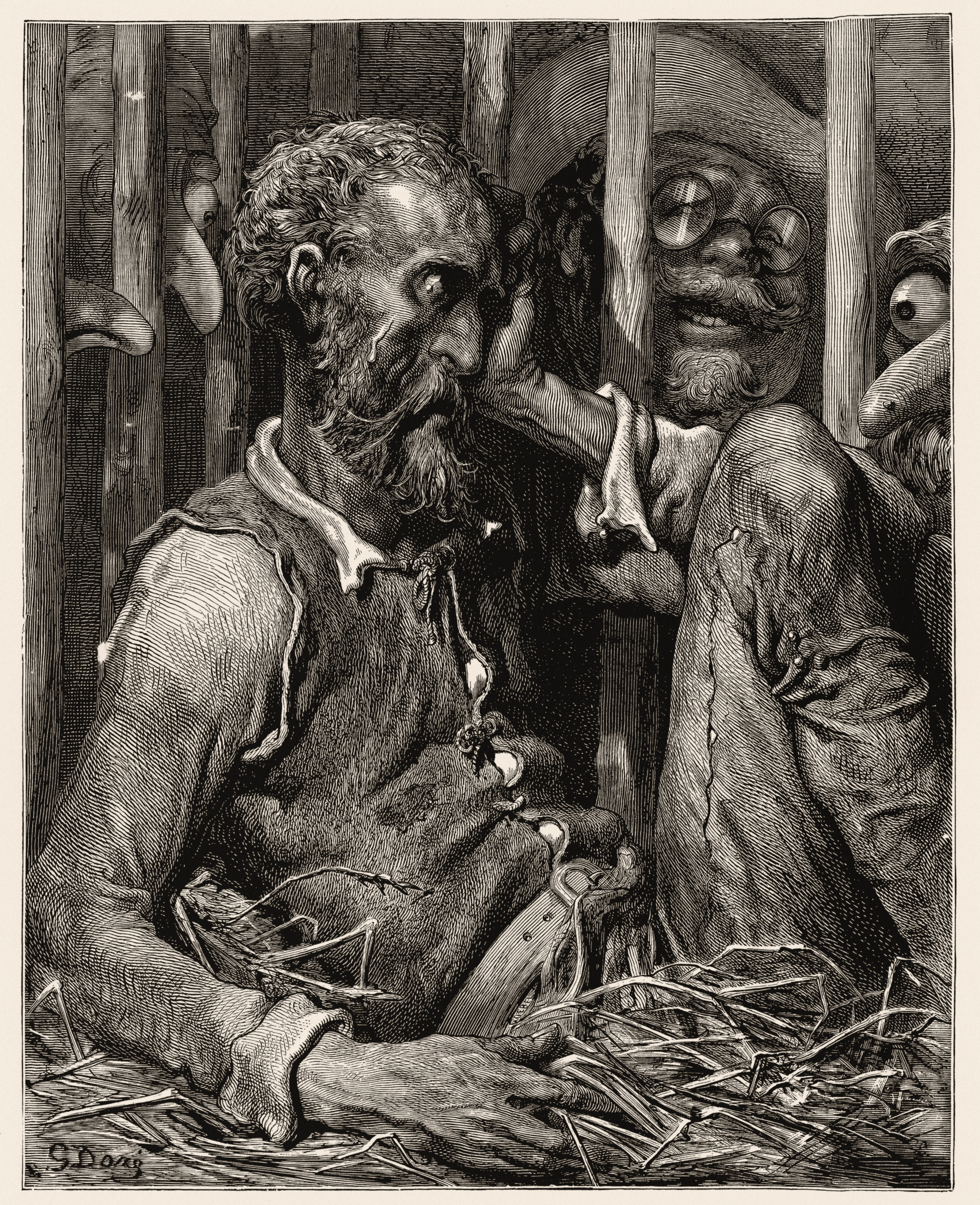
Doré's illustration of Don Chisciotte in his cage

Act 4

In a sleep-walking sequence Don Chisciotte believes he sees the giant Pandafilando. He takes out his sword and begins wildly destroying Mendo's bottles of red wine. He then shows Mendo the giant's severed head, which turns out to be a cooking pot. Don Chisciotte is now convinced that he has been the victim of sorcery. Lucinda escapes Fernando's guards and is reunited with Cardenio. Fernando bursts in an angrily draws his sword. Dorotea throws herself between him and Cardenio. Lucinda and Cardenio exclaim that they would rather die than be separated. Fernando is now torn between his love for Lucinda and a sense of duty and loyalty to Dorotea. Maritorne summons Don Chisciotte to his window and asks him to grasp her hand, otherwise she will die. He climbs on a stool to reach her but Rigo pulls it away leaving Don Chisciotte dangling desperately from the window.

Act 5

Dorotea tells Fernando to go ahead kill her so there will be no further obstacles to his passion for Lucinda. Dorotea's generosity reawakens Fernando's old love for her and he decides to marry her after all. Ordogno shows up disguised as Pandafilando and defeats Don Chisciotte in a duel. He sentences Don Chisciotte to return to La Mancha and shuts him up in a cage which will take him there. Don Chisciotte 's friends now explain their ruse to him, but he interprets everything that has happened as the result of sorcery. As he is taken away in his cage, the final chorus warns the audience not to make fun of him because there are many people even crazier than he. The act ends with a dance of the hotel servants dressed in various masks and disguises.

== Recordings ==
There are no complete commercial recordings of Don Chisciotte in Sierra Morena, but excerpts appear on the following:

- Three Baroque Tenors with Ian Bostridge and the English Consort conducted by Bernard Labadie (contains Don Chisciotte's aria "Qui sto appeso"). Label: EMI Classics
- Francesco Bartolomeo Conti: Sventurata Didone with the Neue Hofkapelle München conducted by Christoph Hammer (contains the opera's overture). Label: ORF
