= Griselda (folklore) =

Character from European folklore

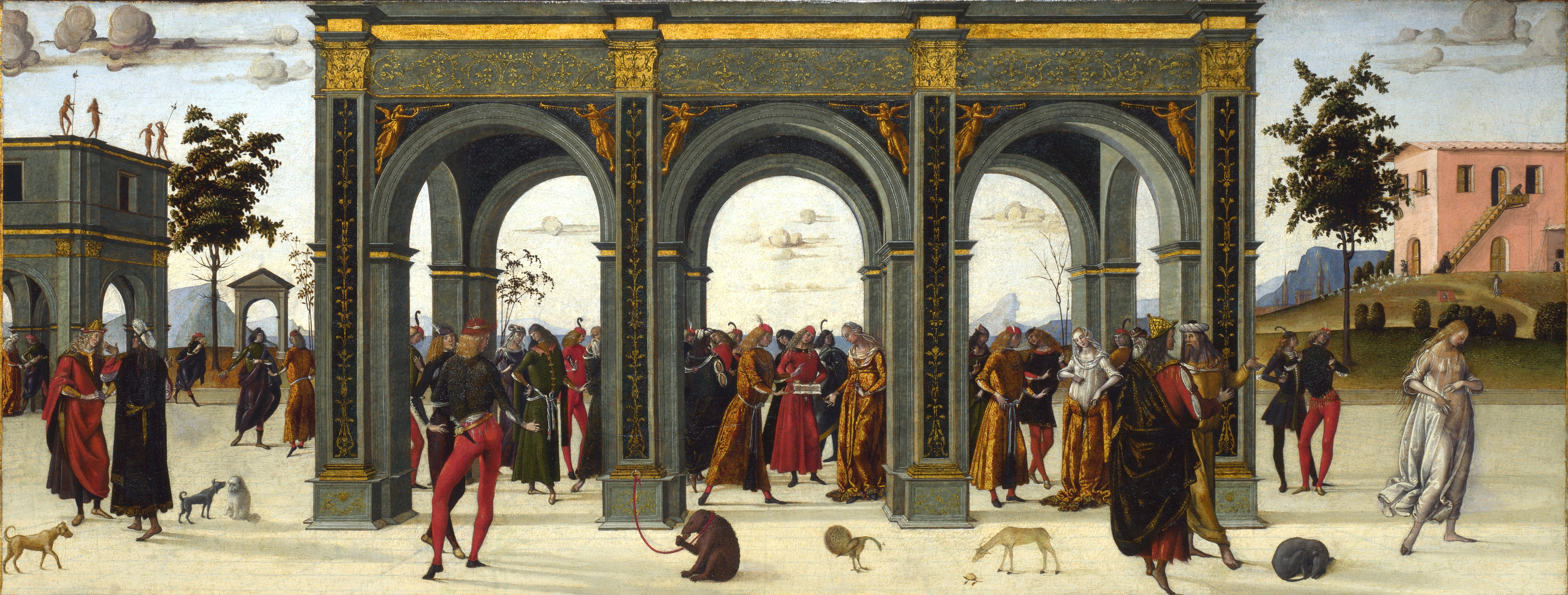
Griselda is sent away as her husband remarries, from a set of Sienese paintings in the National Gallery London (c. 1490, by the unnamed Master of the Story of Griselda)

Griselda (anglicised to Grizzel, Grissel, Grissela and similar forms) is a figure in European folklore noted for her patience and obedience.

== In literature ==
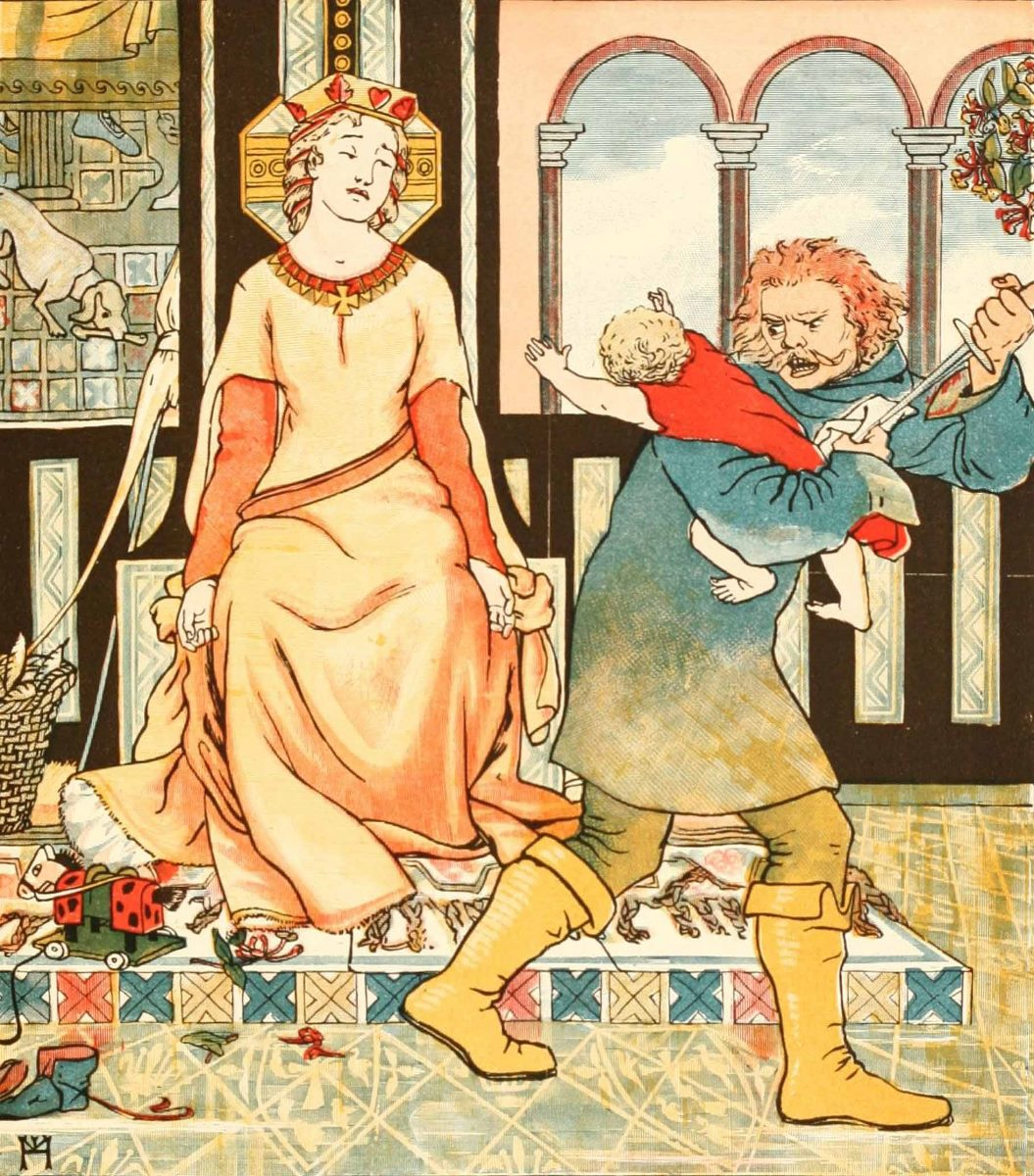
One of Griselda's children is taken away from her in an illustration from Eliza Haweis' 1882 book Chaucer for Children

In the most famous version of the Griselda tale, written by Giovanni Boccaccio c. 1350, Griselda marries Gualtieri, the Marquis of Saluzzo, who tests her by declaring that their two children—a son and a daughter—must both be put to death. Griselda gives both of them up without protest, but Gualtieri does not actually kill the children, instead sending them away to Bologna to be raised. In a final test, Gualtieri publicly renounces Griselda, claiming he had been granted papal dispensation to divorce her and marry a better woman; Griselda goes to live with her father. Some years later, Gualtieri announces he is to remarry and recalls Griselda as a servant to prepare the wedding celebrations. He introduces her to a twelve-year-old girl he claims is to be his bride but who is really their daughter; Griselda wishes them well. At this, Gualtieri reveals their grown children to her and Griselda is restored to her place as wife and mother.

Griselda appears in tales by Petrarch (died 1374, Historia Griseldis published 100 years later) and by Chaucer (The Clerk's Tale in The Canterbury Tales, late 1300s). She is also cited in Christine de Pizan's The Book of the City of Ladies. Patient Griselda is a tale by Charles Perrault (1691). John Phillip's play The Commodye of Pacient and Meeke Grissill (also known as The Plaie of Grissill) dates from 1565. Henry Chettle, Thomas Dekker and William Haughton collaborated on another dramatic version, Patient Grissel, first performed in 1599. There are operas named Griselda by Antonio Maria Bononcini (Griselda, 1718), Alessandro Scarlatti (La Griselda, 1721), Giovanni Bononcini (Griselda, 1722), and Antonio Vivaldi (Griselda, 1735). Also Jules Massenet's Grisélidis (1901) was inspired by the tale of Griselda.

William Shakespeare's play The Winter's Tale (1623) features many elements of the Griselda story. Anthony Trollope's high Victorian novel Miss Mackenzie (1865) is based on the Griselda theme. The Modern Griselda is a novel by Maria Edgeworth from 1804. Patient Griselda is one of a group of historical or legendary dinner-party guests in Caryl Churchill's 1982 play Top Girls. "Patient Griselda" is a 2015 short story by Steven Anthony George in the anthology Twice Upon A Time: Fairytale, Folklore, & Myth. Reimagined & Remastered, where the tale is retold as a late twentieth century horror story.

The tale of Griselda was re-imagined by Margaret Atwood in her short story "Impatient Griselda," which was published in The New York Times Magazine on July 12, 2020.

== In art ==
Boccaccio's story of Griselda is depicted in a set of three Sienese panel paintings dating from around 1490 which hang in the National Gallery in London. They are the work of an unnamed Italian artist known as the Master of the Story of Griselda.

== See also ==
- The Decameron – the most famous version of the Griselda tale
- Summary of Decameron tales
