= Giusto Fontanini =

Italian archbishop and archaeologist

Most Reverend Giusto Fontanini
- Titular Archbishop of Ancyra
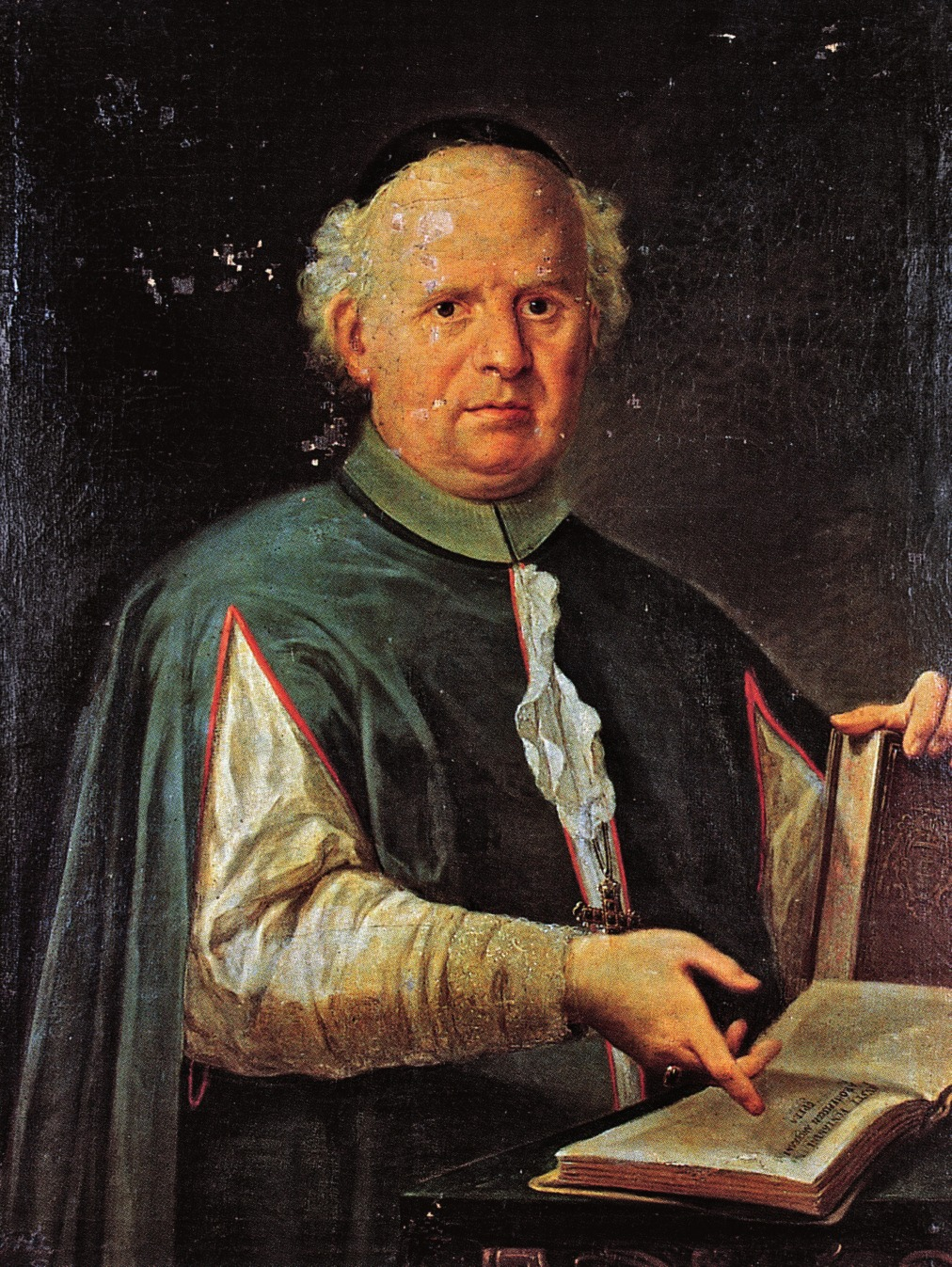
- Portrait of Giusto Fontanini, oil on canvas, 18th century (San Daniele, Biblioteca Guarneriana)
- Church: Roman Catholic Church
- In office: 1725–1736
- Predecessor: Raimondo Gallani
- Successor: Gaetano Calvani

Orders
- Ordination: 23 December 1690
- Consecration: 5 September 1725 by Pope Benedict XIII

Personal details
- Born: 30 October 1666 San Daniele del Friuli, Republic of Venice
- Died: 11 April 1736 (aged 69) Rome, Papal States

Giusto Fontanini (30 October 1666 in San Daniele del Friuli – 17 April 1736 in Rome) was an Italian Roman Catholic archbishop and historian.

== Biography ==
A prelate and attentive bibliophile, in 1697, he became a stubborn and reactionary defender of the Papal Curia. In 1708, he was a protagonist of a contentious controversy over the possession of the territory of Comacchio between the Papacy and the Este Dukes of Modena, along with their protector, the Austrian Habsburg Empire. In 1597, the then Duke of Ferrara Alfonso II d'Este died without heirs. While the Holy Roman Emperor Rudolf II recognised Cesare d'Este as heir to Alfonso, his dubious legitimacy led the Papal States to claim the Duchy of Ferrara, including Comacchio. Cesare and his successors were constrained to the Duchy of Modena. However, in 1708, an Austrian army claimed Commacchio by marching an army to occupy the town. While the Papacy gathered an army to confront the imperial garrison, the rival political and legal claims were trumpeted in competing scholarly treatises: the Este claim by the erudite Ludovico Antonio Muratori, while Fontanini defended the papal claim. With free access to Vatican papers, Fontanini relied on countless texts and composed equally erudite works such as De antiquitatibus Hortae coloniae Etruscorum (1708), Dissertatio de corona ferrea langobardorum, Delle masnade ed altri servi secondo l'uso dei Longobardi and several others. Ultimately, the papacy acquiesced to the occupation for some decades.

Fontanini's most important work is the "Library of Italian Eloquence" (1726), a bibliography of the letters, later corrected and supplemented by Apostolo Zeno, historian and poet (1753). The importance of this project is highlighted in the subtitle: Where are neatly arranged works printed in our vulgar language over the disciplines and the main subjects. A classification of knowledge, then, but with a revolutionary linguistic plan: the vulgar, now national language. The disciplines in which he shares his library of eloquence are: grammar, rhetoric, poetry, dramatic (theatre), lyricism, history, philosophy, and theology. There are both legitimate vulgar works and the vulgarisations of ancient works.

Sharp criticism by the intellectuals of the time for the many omissions and inaccuracies does not diminish the value of this Library, which is recognised as the first step in the arrangement of Italian works.

== Works ==
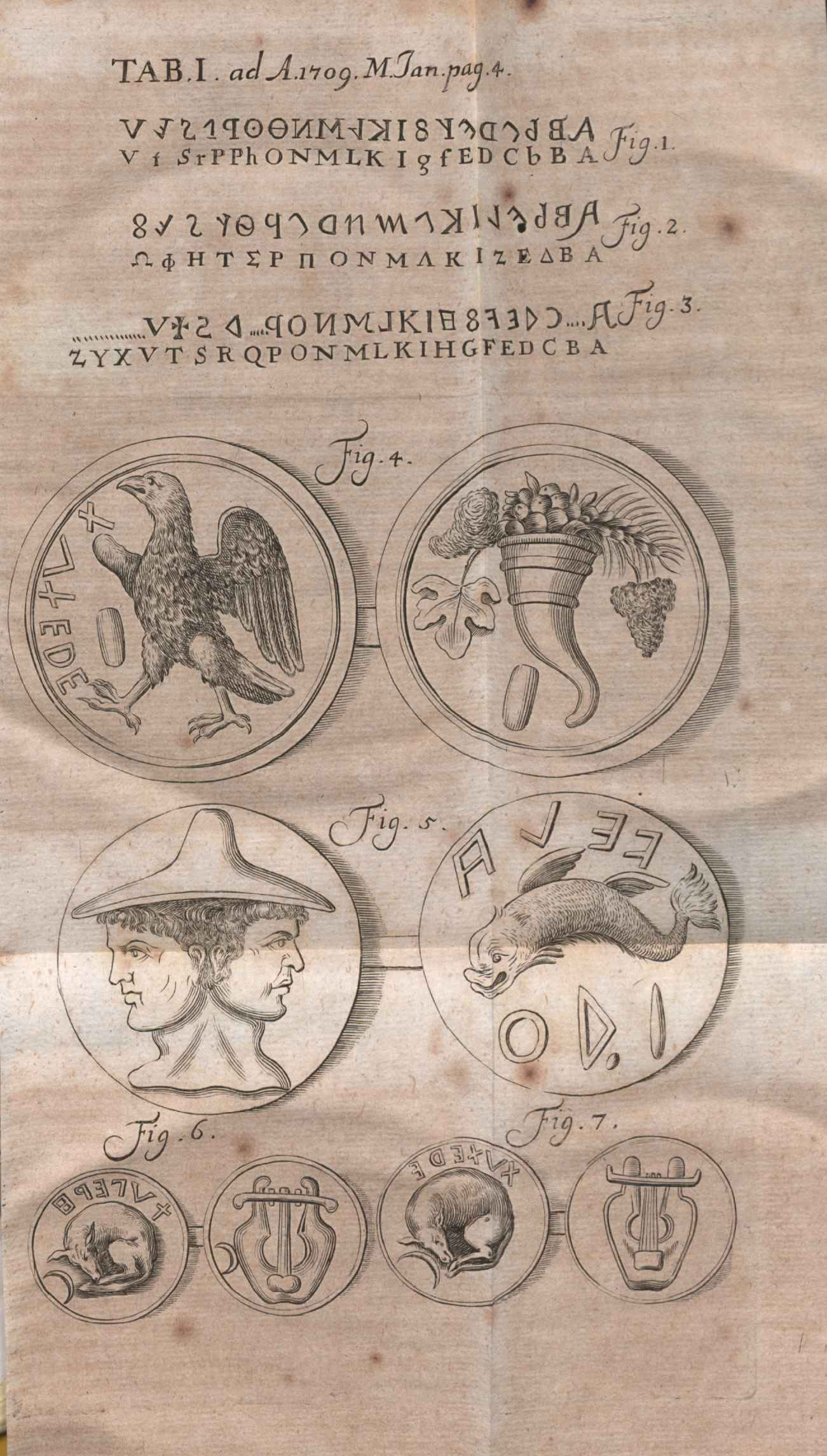
Illustration for the review of Justi Fontanini Forojuliensis De Antiquitatibus Hortae, Coloniae Etruscorum, libri duo, published on Acta Eruditorum, 1709.

=== In Latin ===
- Vindiciæ antiquorum diplomatum adversus Bartholomæi Germonii dissertationem, libri II. Romæ: per Franciscum Gonzagam. 1705.
- Bibliothecæ card. Imperialis catalogus, secundum auctorum cognomina, ordine alphabetico dispositus, Rome, 1711.
- De antiquitatibus Hortæ coloniæ Etruscorum, libri III, Rome, 1713; republished by Burmann in the VIII volume of his Thesaurus Antiquitatum Italicarum.
- Dissertatio de corona ferrea Longobardorum, Rome, 1717; republished by Burmann in the IV volume of his Thesaurus Antiquitatum Italicarum.
- Discus votivus argenteus commentariolo illustratus. Rome: Rocco Bernabò. 1728.
- Achates isiacus annularis commentariolo illustratus, Rome, 1728.
- De corpore S. Augustini Ticini reperto in confessione ædis S. Petri in Cœlo Aureo disquisitio, Rome 1728.
- De S. Petro Urseolo duce Venetorum dissertatio, Rome, 1730.
- Historiæ literariæ Aquilejensis lib. V; accedit dissertatio de anno emortuali S. Athanasii patriarchæ alexandrini, necnon virorum illustrium provinciæ Fori Julii catalogus, Rome, 1742.

=== In Italian ===
- Delle masnade ed altri servi secondo l’uso de' Longobardi. Venice: Girolamo Albrizzi. 1698.
- L’Aminta di Torquato Tasso difeso e illustrato, Rome, 1700; 2nd edition, Venice, 1730.
- Dell'eloquenza italiana, ragionamento steso in una lettera all'illustrissimo sig. marchese Gian Giuseppe Orsi, Rome, 1706; Cesena, 1724; Rome, 1726; Venice, 1727; Rome, 1736.
- Il Dominio temporale della Sede Apostolica sopra la città di Comacchio, colla difesa del medesimo dominio, Rome, 1709.
- Difesa seconda del Dominio temporale della Sede Apostolica sopra la detta città, Rome, 1711.
- Confutazione d'un libro italiano e francese sparso in Germania intorno a Comacchio, Rome, 1711.
- Risposta a varie scritture contro la S. Sede in proposito di Comacchio, Rome, 1720.
- Istoria del Dominio temporale della Sede Apostolica del ducato di Parma e Piacenza, Rome, 1720.

== Bibliography ==
- Busolini, Dario (1997). "FONTANINI, Giusto". Dizionario Biografico degli Italiani (in Italian). Vol. 48: Filoni–Forghieri. Rome: Istituto dell'Enciclopedia Italiana. ISBN 978-88-12-00032-6.
- Roberto Feruglio; Alberto Vidon, eds. (2024). Il carteggio tra Giusto Fontanini e Gian Domenico Bertoli (1718-1736). Udine: Forum Edizioni. ISBN 978-88-3283-483-3.
