= Dafne in lauro =

Dafne in lauro (Daphne as a laurel tree) is a chamber opera, a componimento per camera, composed by Johann Joseph Fux to a libretto by Pietro Pariati and performed for the imperial court before dinner on 1 October 1714 in the Favorita garden, Vienna, for the birthday of Emperor Charles VI. The opera is based on the myth of Apollo and Daphne, where Daphne pleads to Diana to be saved from Apollo's pursuit of her and is turned into a laurel tree.

== Roles ==
Role	Voice	Premiere Cast
Apollo	Castrato	Gaetano Orsini (1667–1750)
Dafne	Soprano	Maria Conti-Landini
Diana	Soprano	Regina Schoonjans
Amore	Castrato	Giovanni Vincenzi
Mercurio	Tenor	Silvio Garghetti

== Recordings ==
- 1990: Clemencic Consort & La Capella Vocal Ensemble, 2CD Nuova Era
- 2021: Alfredo Bernardini; Zefiro, Arcana.

== See also ==
- Dafne: Jacopo Peri
- La Dafne: Marco da Gagliano
- Dafne (Opitz–Schütz) Martin Opitz and Heinrich Schütz
