= Maria Landini =

Italian soprano

Maria Landini (Note: Landini is known by a variety of names in 18th-century sources, including Maria Landini di Chateauneuf, Maria Landini di Castelnovo, Maria Landini-Conti, Maria Landini-Contini, La Conti, La Contini, La Landini, and La Landina.) (c. 1668 – 22 June 1722) was an Italian soprano who began her career as a singer at the court of Queen Christina in Rome but was primarily active at the imperial court in Vienna from 1711 until her death. She created numerous soprano roles in operas and oratorios by Fux, Caldara, and her second husband, Francesco Bartolomeo Conti and was reputedly the highest paid musician in Vienna at the time.

== Life and career ==
Landini's mother, Francesca Portui, was the maid of Queen Christina of Sweden and married to Francesco Landini, the captain of Christina's guards. However, Francesco Landini was not her biological father. Maria was born from a relationship between her mother and the marquise Orazio Del Monte, Christina's chamberlain. According to 17th-century sources, she was born in Hamburg where Christina's court periodically sojourned, although the date of her birth has variously been given as 1667, 1668, and 1670. Maria spent her entire childhood and youth at the court of Queen Christina where she was trained as a singer and was known by the diminutive "Mariuccia". By the late 1680s there are records of her regularly performing in private musical evenings at Queen Christina's court in Rome. She often sang together with another favourite singer of the queen, Angela Voglia (known as "La Giorgina").

After Queen Christina's death in 1689, Landini entered the service of Sophia Charlotte of Hanover in Germany. She married an actor named "Chateauneuf" in Hannover in 1695 and sometimes appeared under the name "Landini di Chateauneuf" or its Italian version "Castelnovo". According to Francesco Conti's biographer Hermine Williams, Castelnovo was from an aristocratic family and his full name was Mallo di Castelnuovo. Their marriage would produce three children: Ferdinando, Francesca, and Caterina. Landini was active in the opera houses of Italy from 1698 when she was in the service of the Duke of Mantua. Her earliest appearance in Mantua was in 1698 in Giovanni Bononcini's Camilla. She also appeared in Venice, Genoa, Casale Monferrato, Livorno, Modena, and Bologna before moving to Vienna in 1710 where she became the prima donna of Emperior Charles VI's court theatre. In 1714, following the death of her first husband, Landini married Francesco Bartolomeo Conti in Vienna's Schottenkirche. In her will, written in the year prior to her death, she asked, if she should die in Vienna, to be buried in the Schottenkirche next to her first husband. But she eventually was not buried there, because she died outside of Vienna.

In 1725 Conti married Anna Maria Lorenzani who had succeeded Landini as the prima donna at the imperial court.

== Roles created ==
Roles created by Maria Landini include:

- Clori in Johann Joseph Fux's La decima fatica di Ercole, Habsburg court theatre, Vienna, 1710
- Merope in Francesco Gasparini's Merope, Teatro San Cassiano, Venice, 26 December 1711
- Dafne in Johann Joseph Fux's Dafne in lauro, Habsburg court theatre, Vienna, 1714
- Euridice in Johann Joseph Fux's Orfeo ed Euridice, Habsburg court theatre, Vienna, 1715
- Angelica in Johann Joseph Fux's Angelica, vincitrice di Alcina, Habsburg court theatre, Vienna, 1716
- Ifigenia in Johann Joseph Fux's Diana plaeata, Habsburg court theatre, Vienna, 1717
- Lucinda in Francesco Bartolomeo Conti's Don Chisciotte in Sierra Morena, Habsburg court theatre, Vienna, 6 February 1719
