= Master of the Story of Griselda =

Italian painter

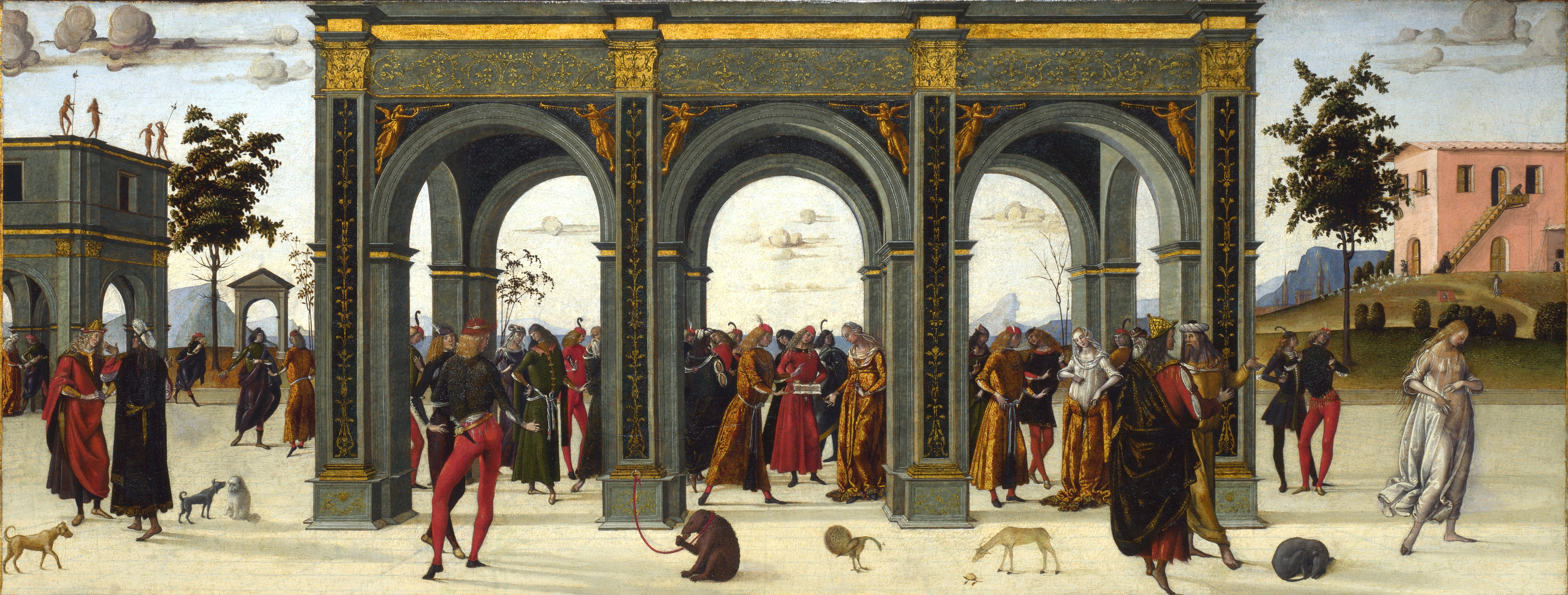
The Story of Griselda. Part II: Exile

The Master of the Story of Griselda was an Italian artist who specialized in panel paintings. He worked in Umbria around 1490 and probably spent time in Siena. There is no evidence of him after 1500.

== Works ==
He received his notname from a group of paintings depicting the story of Griselda, as recounted by Giovanni Boccaccio in his Decameron. The works are classified as spalliere and belonged to the Piccolominis or the Spannocchis. At that time, prominent families often commissioned panel paintings for their private rooms; or to celebrate weddings and births. His work appears to match the type of paintings that would be desired.

He painted in the style of Pinturicchio, to whom these paintings were originally attributed. The influence of Luca Signorelli is also very noticeable. In fact, a cycle of famous men and women, originally believed to be Signorelli's, are now credited to the Master. Taken together, it is almost certain that he spent time working in Siena, although he is only documented in nearby Umbria.

His three known panels on Griselda are at the National Gallery in London. The cycle of famous people consisted of eight panels; four of which were by the Master. They have been separated: Artemisia is in the Museo Poldi Pezzoli (Milan), Alexander the Great is in the Barber Institute of Fine Arts (Birmingham), Joseph is in the National Gallery of Art (Washington D.C.) and Tiberius Gracchus is in the Szépművészeti Múzeum (Budapest).
