= Anton Karl Richter =

Anton Karl Richter (1690 – 10 November 1763) was a Baroque composer and organist from the Holy Roman Empire. He was first a student and court musician at the Wiener Hofmusikkapelle before serving as a court organist there from 1718 to 1751.

== Biography ==
Anton Karl Richter was born in Vienna in 1690. In 1699 he was admitted to the Vienna court chapel as a music student of his father, the court organist and composer Ferdinand Tobias Richter. He also worked as musician in the music ensemble of the Wiener Hofmusikkapelle (WH) from 1699 on. Johann Joseph Fux was also his teacher.

From 1718 to 1751 Anton was a court organist of the WH; initially working in the position of sixth organist, the lowliest post in the WH. He held the higher post of second organist of the WH from 1741 to 1751. He died in Vienna on 11 November 1763. The Department of Music at the Austrian National Library holds original music manuscripts by Richter for a suite and two character pieces for keyboard. According to the Oesterreichisches Musiklexikon claims that he was also the composer referred to as Richter that was at Gerber are questionable.

Anton Karl Richter died in Vienna on 10 November 1763.
