= Wiener Hofmusikkapelle =

Musical ensemble

The Wiener Hofmusikkapelle was an establishment of musicians employed at the Habsburg's Imperial court in Vienna (Wien). The Hofmusikkapelle was established in 1498 under Maximilian I, Holy Roman Emperor. It survived more than 420 years until its dissolution in 1922.

== History ==
Prior to the establishment of the Hofmusikkapelle under Maximillian I, there were already a number of professional vocal and instrumental musicians providing music for what is now termed the Burgundian-Habsburg court. Most notable among them was the organist Paul Hofhaimer and the composer and singer Pierre de la Rue. In 1490 Maximilian conquered the territory of the Tyrol and Vienna, although not setting up his court in Vienna until 1498. This was the year the Hofmusikkapelle was founded. The first music director was George Slatkonia who was already a chaplain and cantor at the court in Vienna, being also the canon and provost of the Diocese of Ljubljana. In 1498 he was appointed as the first singing master of the Hofmusikkapelle and two years later became the Hofmusikkapelle's master. Besides the singing master, two bass players and six boys were employed.

Under Emperor Ferdinand I most of the musicians of the Hofmusikkapelle were Flemish and under Ferdinand II most came from Italy. The Hofmusikkapelle flourished under subsequent emperors until about 1740, after which Maria Theresa and Joseph II restricted its role solely to liturgical music. Antonio Salieri, who taught Beethoven, was for many years in charge of music at the Imperial court.

After World War I and the end of Habsburg rule, the court musicians fell under the aegis of Austria's Ministry of Education. Boy singers were replaced by ladies of the Vienna State Opera until the Hofmusikkapelle was finally disbanded in 1922.

In 1924 music returned to the chapel building (Hofburgkapelle) when the Vienna Boys' Choir (Wiener Sängerknaben) was established there.

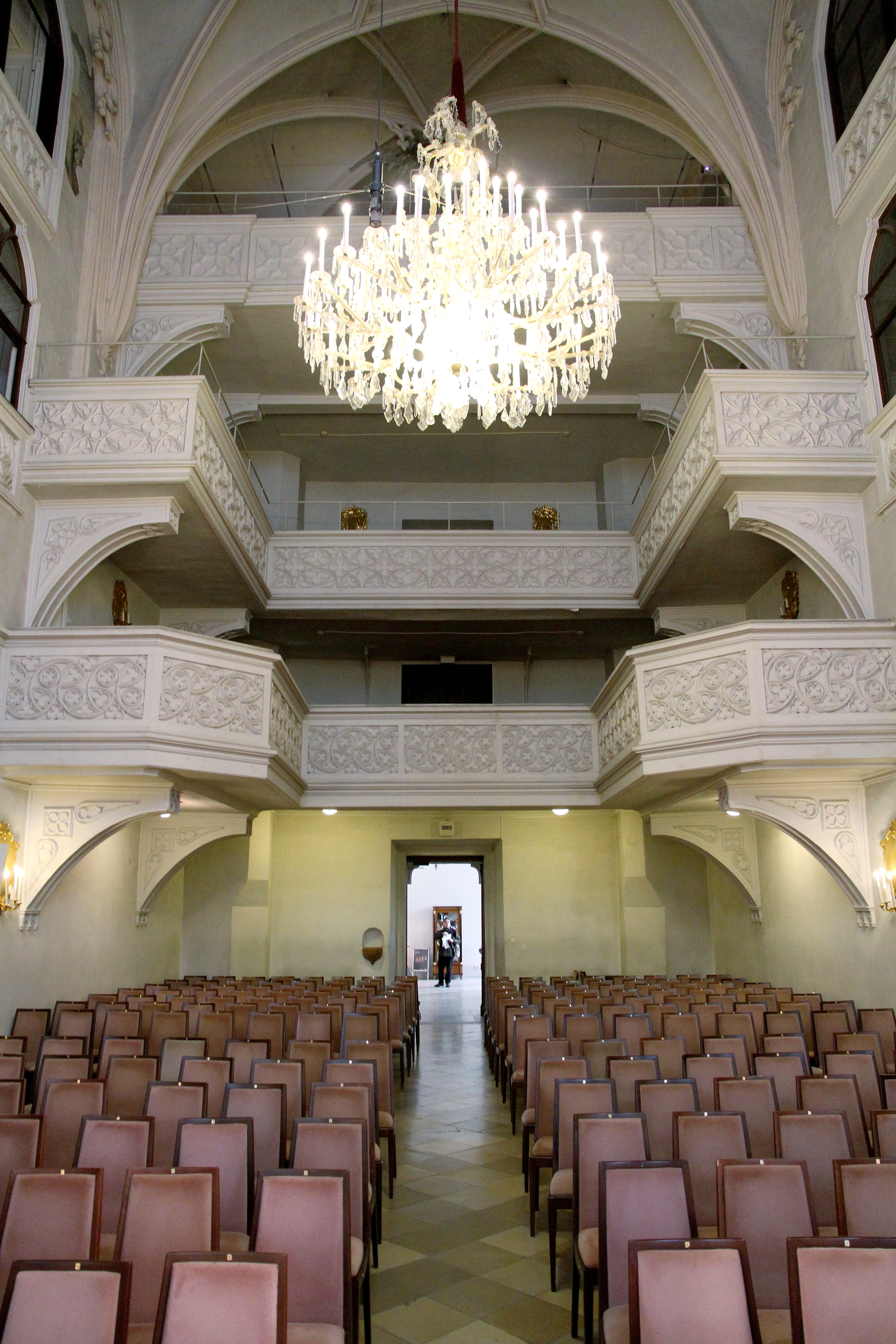
Hofburgkapelle, looking west

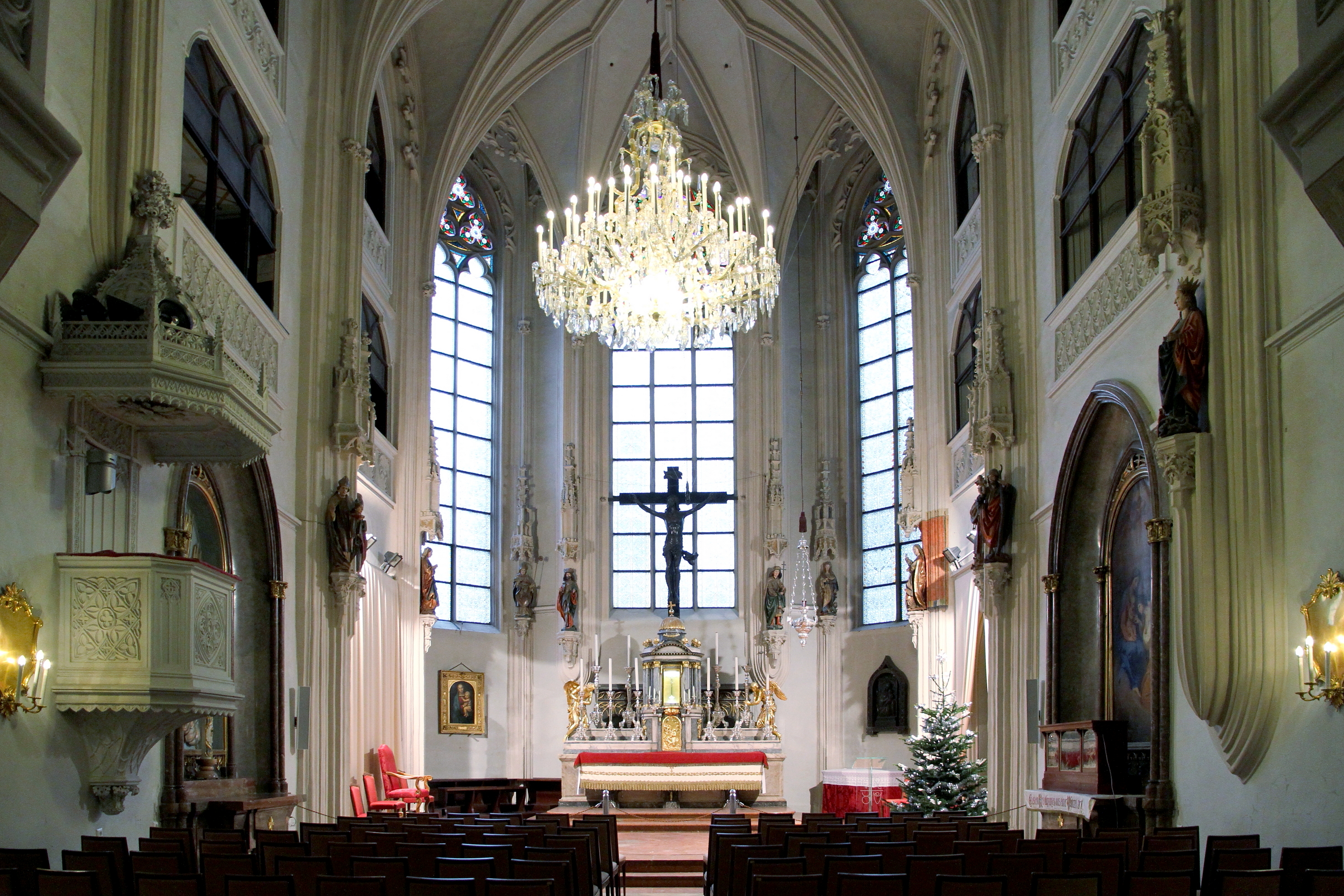
Hofburgkapelle, looking east

Today the spirit of the Hofmusikkapelle flourishes within the confines of the Imperial chapel building (Hofburgkapelle) which is still home to the Vienna Boys' Choir. The Vienna Boys Choir regularly performs there for church services and concerts, with the participation of male singers from the chorus of the Vienna State Opera and members of the Vienna Philharmonic.

== Hofburgkapelle ==
An imperial chapel building was first created in Vienna in around 1287 by Albert I, built in the late Romanesque style. The building was enlarged under Albert II between 1423 and 1426. Between 1447 and 1449 it was rebuilt in a Gothic style by Frederick III. In the mid eighteenth-century Maria Theresa arranged for the chapel building to be redesigned in a late Baroque style.

=== Organs ===
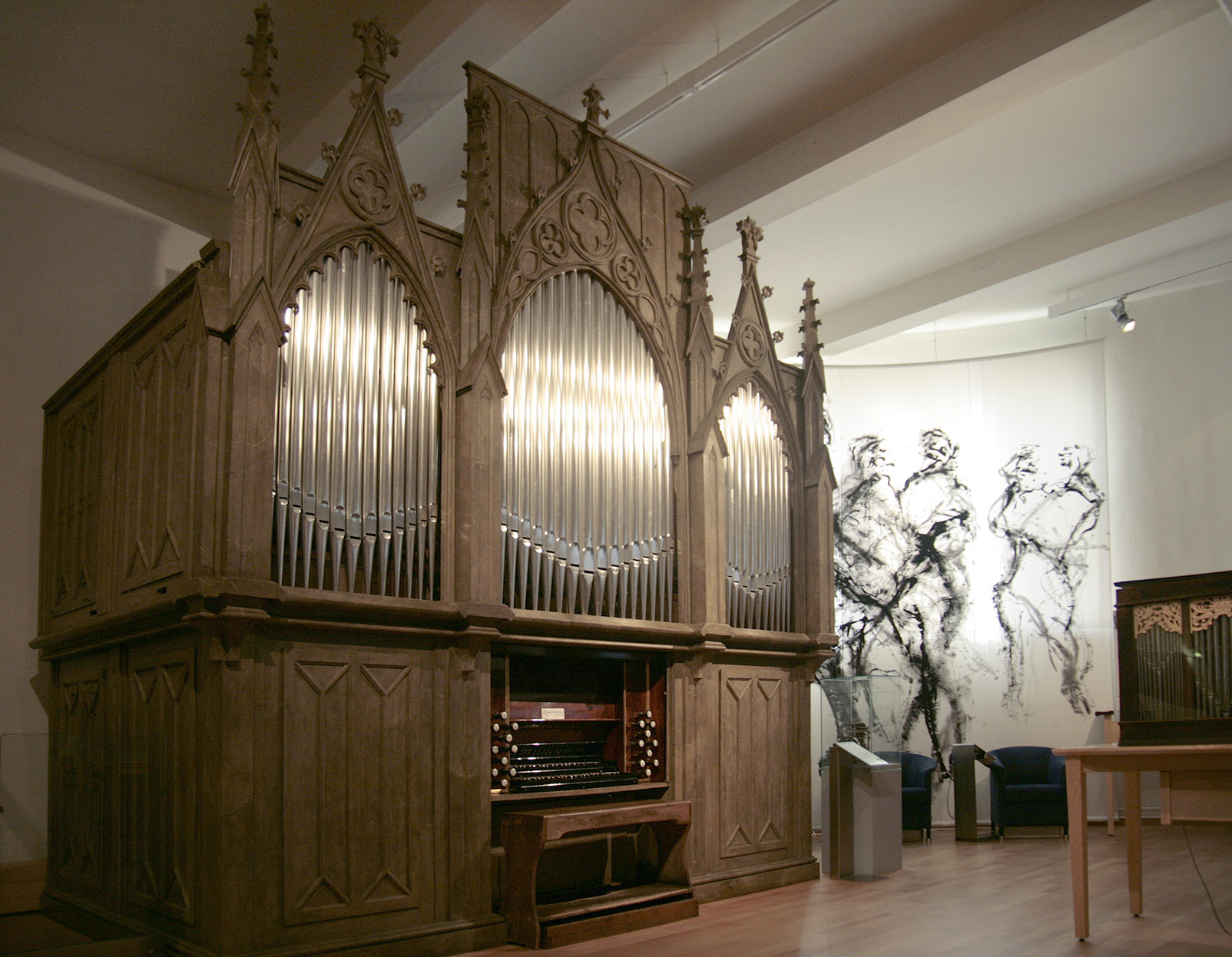
1862 organ by Buckow, now in the Vienna Technical Museum

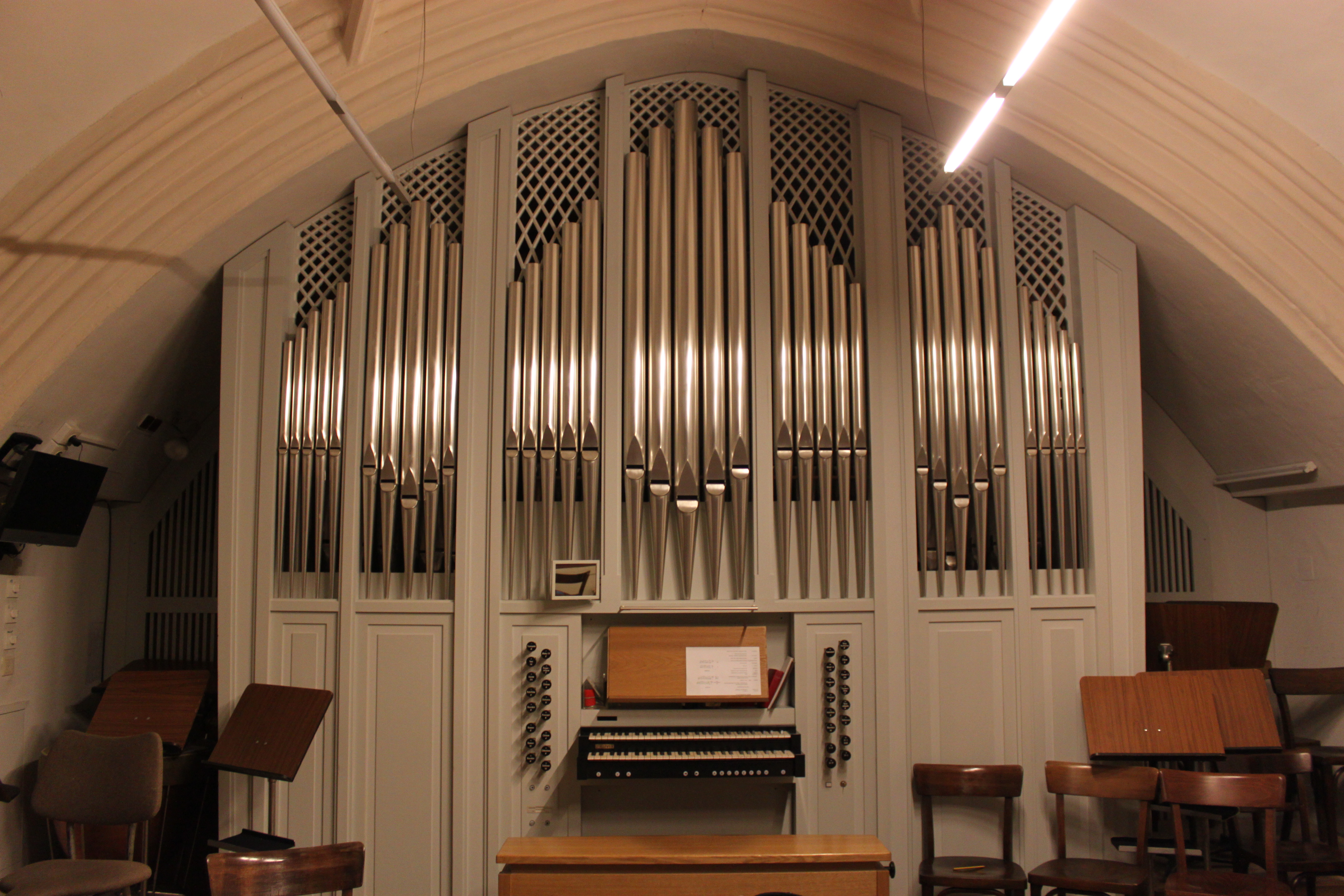
2001 Kühn organ

- 1629: by ? No details.
- 1763: by J. F. Ferstl. 18 stops, 2 manuals. The instrument was placed on the left side of the lower gallery. The instrument was repaired in 1795 and 1798 by Johann Wimola.
- 1802/3: by Johann Joseph Wiest, the court organ builder. This new organ was placed on the rear wall of the gallery, incorporating old pipes. The instrument had 20 stops, distributed across the Hauptwerk, Rückpositiv, and Pedal. The organ, inspected by Salieri in 1803, was soon criticized for being so "feeble that it resembled more a positive than what it was meant to be," and despite frequent maintenance, it was constantly out of tune.
- 1823: by Christoph Erler. The severe space constraints on the lower gallery led to unusual solutions for the division of the organ with the console on the music gallery and the organ pipes and bellows on the middle gallery. The stoplist was the work of Johann Henneberg (1768–1822; court organist 1818 until 1822). This instrument was described by Vincent Novello as one of the best small organs he had ever heard. Thirty years later, this was no longer the case; court conductor Ignaz Assmayr (court organist from 1825 until 1846) judged it harshly: "The organ of the Imperial and Royal Court Parish Church has become so outdated and worn over the years that it can be said with considerable certainty that no less usable organ can be found in any parish church in Vienna..."
- 1862: by Carl Friedrich Ferdinand Buckow|de (1801–64). 16 stops, 2 manuals and pedal. The Buckow organ, however, conflicted with the performance requirements of the Hofmusikkapelle, and the organ debate resumed. In 1940, a contract was signed with the Göttingen firm Paul Ott for a new organ with 28 stops across three manuals. Large tin pipes from the old organ were destroyed in a bombing raid on Göttingen, and the new organ was never built. Due to space limitations, the old organ was moved to the tower arch in 1951; the neo-Gothic case was removed, a "dummy" zinc façade erected, and the action and wind-chests inadequately repaired.
- 1962: by Walcker Orgelbau. 26 stops, 2 manuals and pedal. The dismantled Buckow organ was handed over to the Vienna Technical Museum in 1968, where it remains on display. In due course the Walcker organ required monthly repairs just to remain functional. Tuning the mixture stops was no longer possible, the voicing was uneven, and the sound was broad and inhomogeneous. A full restoration was out of the question, and in 2001, the contract for a new organ was awarded to Orgelbau Kuhn.
- 2003: by Orgelbau Kuhn; 27 stops, 2 manuals and pedal. Mechanical key action, dual stop action, electronic combination system (2,650 presets). Total of 1,654 pipes, including 92 wooden pipes.

=== Organists ===
- Hans Buchner (1483–1538).
- Hans Grauendorfer (Court Organist 1544–1545).
- Christoph Khräll (Court Organist 1546–1564).
- Jacobus Buus (Paus) (c. 1500–1565; Organist in Venice 1541; Court Organist 1553–1564).
- Wilhelmus Formellis (c. 1541–1582; Court Organist 1564–1582).
- Wilhelm van Mülen (d. 1598; Assistant Organist 1567–1585).
- Paul van Winde (d. 1596; Court Organist 1570–1593).
- Hanns Berger (Court Organist 1573–1596).
- Carl Luython (1557–1620; Court Organist 1582–1612).
- Hanns Lemmens (Court Organist 1594–1599).
- Liberalis Zanchi (1570–after 1621; Court Organist 1596–1612).
- Kaspar Raickerroy (Raykheroi, Remkheroi) (Court Organist 1607–1612).
- Jakob Haßler (Hälsler) (1566–1622; Court Organist 1602–1612).
- Christoph Strauß (c. 1575–1631; Court Organist 1612–1619).
- Thomas Podenstein (Court Organist 1612–1619).
- Mathias Platzer (Court Organist 1619).
- Giovanni Valentini (1582/83–1649; Court Organist 1619–1626).
- Alessandro Tadei (Todey) (c. 1585–1667; Court Organist 1619–1628).
- Alessandro Bontempo (Assistant Organist 1619).
- Johann Albrecht Platzer (Court Organist 1637–1641).
- Giovanni Giacomo Arrigoni (Court Organist 1637).
- Wolfgang Ebner (1612–1665; Court Organist 1637–1665).
- Johann Jakob Froberger (1616–1667; Court Organist: 1637, 1641–1645, 1649, 1653–1657).
- Carl Ferdinand Simonelli (Court Organist 1640–1653)
- Paul Neidlinger (Court Organist 1654–1659).
- Marcus Ebner (1626–1681; Court Organist 1655–1680).
- Alessandro Poglietti (Court Organist 1661–1683).
- Carlo Cappellini (Court Organist 1665–1683).
- Johann Kaspar Kerll (1627–1693; Court Organist 1680–1692).
- Ferdinand Tobias Richter (1649–1711; Court Organist 1683–1711).
- Franz Mathias Techelmann (c. 1649–1713; Court Organist 1685–1711).
- Carlo Domenico Draghi (1669–1711; Court Organist 1698–1711).
- Leopold Rammer (Römer) (1664–1730; Court Organist 1700–1730).
- Georg Reutter the Elder (1656–1738; Court Organist 1700–1738).
- Johann Georg Reinhardt (1676/77–1742; Court Organist 1708–after 1740).
- Johann Franz Neubauer (1669–1732; Court Organist 1713–1732).
- August Gottlieb Muffat (1690–1770; Court Organist 1717–1763).
- Anton Karl Richter (1690–1763; Court Organist 1718–1751).
- Johann Baptist Payer (Peyer) (1678?–1733; Court Organist 1721–1733).
- Franz Rusovsky (d. 1763; Court Organist 1726–1740; "reactivated" 1750–1763?).
- Anton Werndle (1700?–1754; Court Organist 1733–1741).
- Wenzel Birck (1718–1763; Court Organist 1739–1763).
- Matthias Karl Reinhardt (1711–1767; Court Organist 1739–1762).
- Ferdinand Arbesser (1719–1794; Court Organist 1772–1791).
- Johann Georg Albrechtsberger (1736–1809; Court Organist 1772–1793).
- Georg Summer (1742?–1809; Court Organist 1791–1809).
- Wenzel Ruzicka (1758–1823; Court Organist 1793–1823).
- Franz Teyber (1756–1810; Court Organist 1810).
- Sebastian Oehlinger (1785–1818; Court Organist 1811–1818).
- Johann Henneberg (1768–1822; Court Organist 1818–1822).
- Johann Hugo Woricek (Vorisek) (1791–1825; Court Organist 1823–1825).
- Simon Sechter (1788–1867; Court Organist 1823–1867).
- Ignaz Assmayer (1790–1862; Court Organist 1825–1846).
- Gottfried Preyer (1808–1901; Court Organist 1846–1862).
- Ludwig Rotter (1810–1895; Court Organist from 1862).
- Pius Richter (1828–1893; Court Organist 1863?–1893)Rudolf Bibl (1832–1902; Court Organist 1863–1901).
- Anton Bruckner (1824–1896; Court Organist 1878–1892).
- Robert Fuchs (1847–1927; Court Organist 1902–1905).
- Georg Valcker (d. 1929; Court Organist 1894–1921).
- Rudolf Dittrich (1861–1919; Court Organist 1901–1919).
- Josef Labor (1842–1924; "Imperial and Royal Court Organist" from 1904).
- Louis Dité (1891–1969; Court Organist 1917–1957).
- Heinrich Müller (d. 1947; Court Organist from 1918).
- Josef Julius Böhm (1907–1984; Organist at the Hofmusikkapelle "with conducting duties" 1947–1972).
- Alois Forer (1909–2001; Organist at the Hofmusikkapelle 1957–1974).
- Herbert Tachezi (1930–2016; Organist at the Hofmusikkapelle since 1974-2012).
- Martin Haselböck (b. 1954; Organist at the Hofmusikkapelle 1978-2019).
- Alfred Halbartschlager (b. 1943, Organist at the Hofmusikkapelle 1984-2012).
- Jeremy Joseph (b. 1978, Organist at the Hofmusikkapelle since 2012).
- Wolfgang Kogert (b. 1980, Organist at the Hofmusikkapelle since 2012).
