= Sesostri re di Egitto =

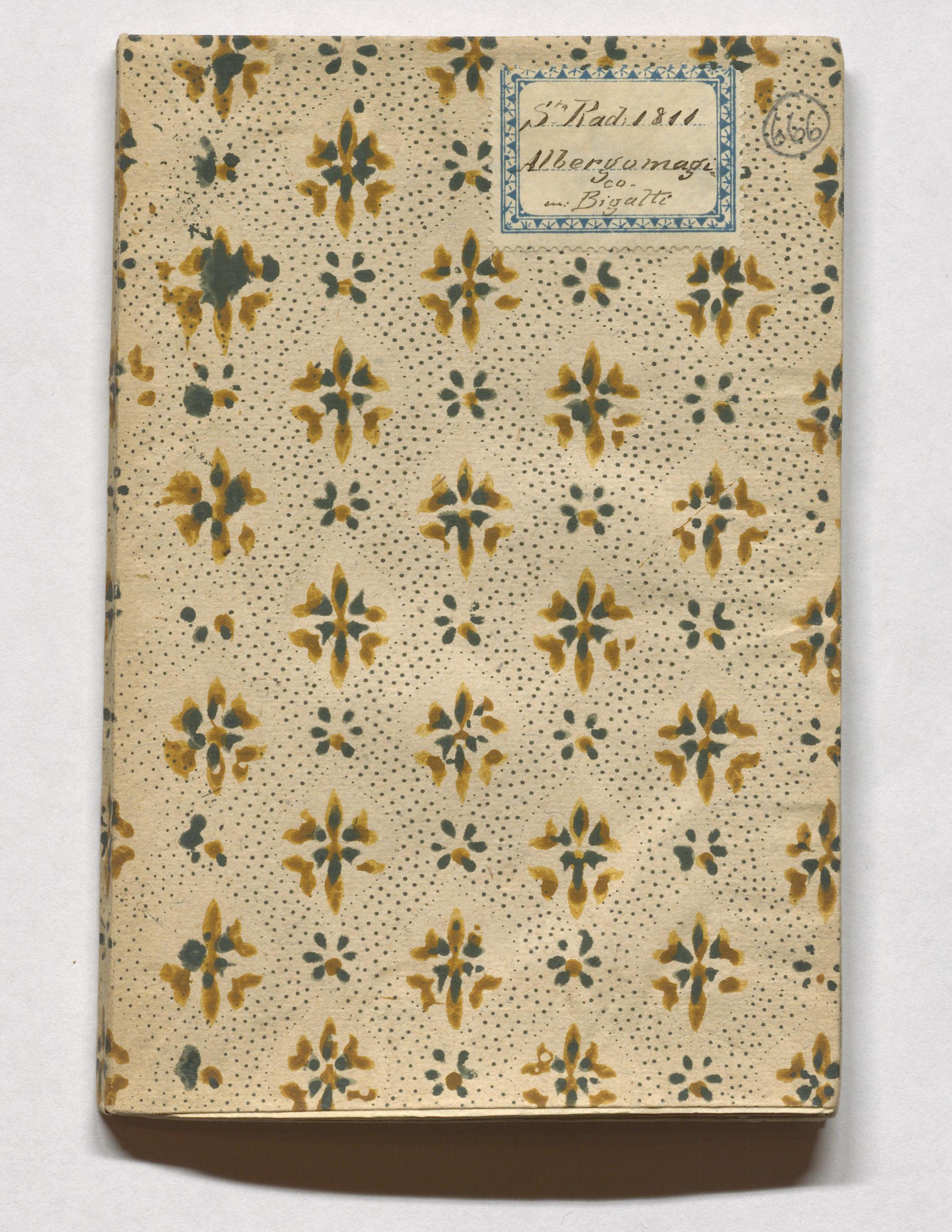
Sesostri, re di Egitto, decorated libretto cover (1716)

Sesostri re di Egitto (IAB 13) (Sesostris, King of Egypt) is a three-act melodramma/opera composed by Italian composer Antonio Maria Bononcini in 1716, composed for seven voices and a seven-instrument orchestra. The Italian language libretto, written by Apostolo Zeno and Pietro Pariati, was published the same year in Milan by publisher Marc'Antonio Pandolfo Malatesta. The work premiered at the Teatro Regio Ducale on 2 February 1716. The opera is dedicated to Prince Eugene of Savoy and Piedmont, and tells the story about the mythical king Sesostris of Egypt.

The original manuscript is currently being held at the Saxon State Library in Dresden, Germany. There is currently no contemporary recording or performance of the work.

== Roles ==
There are seven characters in the work.

Roles and descriptions
Role	Description
Sesostri	The son of Aprius, former king of Egypt, lover of Artenice and believed to be Osiris the natural son of Amasis
Amasi	A tyrant, killer of Aprio and lover of Artenice
Artenice	The daughter of Phanetes, lover of Sesostri
Canopo	The son of Amasi
Nitocri	The widowed queen of Aprio
Fanete	One of the main satraps of the kingdom, father of Artenice, confidant of Amasis but also his enemy
Orgonte	The captain of the royal guards, also a confidant of Amasi, but connected with Fanete

== Instrumentation ==
The opera is scored for

- Violins I & II
- Viols
- Oboe
- Cellos
- Bassoons
- Double Bass
- Harpsichord
