= Pietro Pariati =

Italian librettist and poet (1665-1733)

Pietro Pariati (Reggio Emilia, 27 March 1665-Vienna, 14 October 1733) was an Italian poet and librettist. From 1714-1729 he was Metastasio's predecessor at the Vienna court of Charles VI, Holy Roman Emperor.

== Biography ==
Born in Reggio Emilia, was initially secretary to Rinaldo d'Este (1655–1737), Duke of Modena. Then from 1699 to 1714, he made his living as a poet in Venice, initially writing librettos with Apostolo Zeno, then independently. In 1714 he moved to Vienna, where he was appointed imperial poet.

== Works ==
The author of prose tragedies, comic intermezzi, verses of various kinds, and pastoral fables, he is mainly known for his libretti, of which he composed at least ten as sole author, and many more in collaboration with the more famous Apostolo Zeno; the most successful of these, performed in theatres up to the end of the century, were Sesostri re di Egitto (1709) and Arianna e Teseo (1726).

== Librettos ==
Apart from many oratorio librettos, his most popular opera librettos included:

- Flavio Anicio Olibrio (with Zeno, 1708), set by Gasparini, Porpora and Jommelli
- Astarto (with Zeno, 1708), set by Albinoni and Caldara
- Sesostri re di Egitto (1710), set by Gasparini and Galuppi
- Il Giustino (after Beregan, 1711), set by Albinoni, Vivaldi and Händel
- Costantino (1711), set by Gasparini and Lotti/Caldara
- Teseo in Creta (1715), set by Porpora, Händel and Galuppi
- Orfeo ed Euridice (1715), set by Johann Joseph Fux
- Don Chisciotte in Sierra Morena (with Zeno, 1719), set by Conti and Holzbauer
