= Girolamo Albrizzi =

Girolamo Albrizzi (c. 1662 – 1713) was an Italian printer and publisher active in Venice, founder of the Albrizzi typographic and editorial enterprise, which became one of the leading publishing houses in the Republic of Venice between the late 17th and mid-18th centuries.

== Biography ==
Girolamo Albrizzi descended from a noble family originating from Bergamo, formerly known as Alberici. From the final decades of the 17th century, he established himself in Venice as the initiator of the Albrizzi printing and publishing firm, laying the foundations for a family enterprise that would later flourish under his descendants.

Albrizzi acquired the book stocks of the Contarini press at Piazzola sul Brenta and expanded his activities beyond book printing to include the publication of serial and periodical works intended for an urban and literate readership.

== Publishing activity ==
Among Albrizzi's earliest editorial projects were several periodicals of civic and cultural interest, including the Protogiornale Veneto perpetuo, published intermittently between 1673 and 1716, the short-lived Pallade Veneta (1687), and the Giornale Veneto de’ Letterati.

His most influential undertaking was the Galleria di Minerva, overo notizie universali di quanto è stato scritto da’ letterati d’Europa, issued in seven volumes between 1696 and 1717. Albrizzi acted as its principal director, and the work functioned in practice as the printed organ of the Accademia della Galleria di Minerva, an intellectual society founded by him. Contributors included prominent scholars such as Vincenzo Maria Coronelli, Apostolo Zeno, and Antonio Vallisneri.

A near-complete record of Albrizzi's typographic production is preserved in the Catalogus alphabetice dispositus, published in Venice in 1720, which documents the breadth of his editorial activity.

== Legacy ==
The Albrizzi press became one of the most important cultural institutions of its kind in Venice. Under Girolamo's initiative and later through the work of his successors, particularly his son Giambattista, the firm contributed significantly to the dissemination of scholarly, geographic, and historical knowledge. The Albrizzi editions were notable for their visual quality and for their collaboration with leading engravers and artists of the period.

The family's later publications included major illustrated works such as Lo stato presente di tutti i paesi e popoli del mondo, the Italian translation of Thomas Salmon’s Modern History. Although often attributed to Salmon, the engraved maps and perspective views in these volumes reused and expanded cartographic material previously issued by the Albrizzi press.
