= Cambise =

Opera by Alessandro Scarlatti

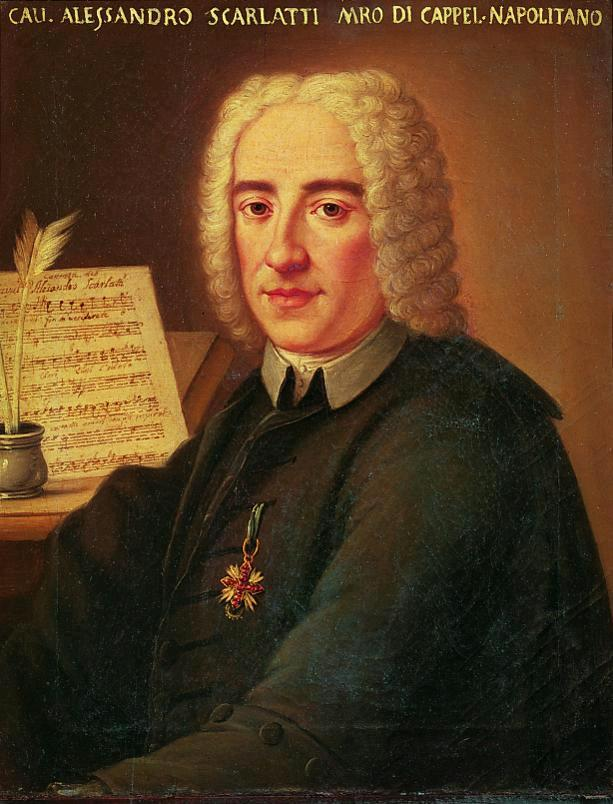
Alessandro Scarlatti

Il Cambise is an opera by Alessandro Scarlatti to a libretto by Domenico Lalli. It was first performed on 4 February 1719 at the Teatro San Bartolomeo in Naples. It was the composer's 111th opera and his last for Naples.

== Selected recordings ==
- Sinfonia "doppo che sia alzata la tenda", Arias "Io parto vincitor". "In quelle luci belle" "Mi cinga la fama" Daniela Barcellona (mezzo) Concerto de Cavalieri, Marcello Di Lisa DHM
- "Tutto appoggio il mio disegno" Max Cencic Il Pomo D'Oro, Maxim Emelyanychev Decca 2015
- "Quando vedrai", "Mi cinga la fama" Carlo Vistoli (countertenor) I Talenti Vulcanici, Stefano Demicheli. Arcana 2017
