= Christoph Ludwig Fehre =

German composer and organist

Christoph Ludwig Fehre (18 January 1718 – 28 October 1772) was a German composer and organist. He was the brother of David Augustin Fehre.

Fehre was born in Zehren, Electorate of Saxony. As a child, he studied at the Lyceum in Chemnitz and took his first music lessons from his uncle Johann Christian Gerstner (1675–1753). Then from 1727 till 1734, he attended the Anne School in Dresden. In 1742, he made an unsuccessful bid for the post of organist at the Frauenkirche, Dresden. On 26 February 1754, he became a trainee organist of Anne's Church, Dresden, then organist from August 1757. On 20 July 1760, Anne's Church was destroyed, and for the next nine years Fehre was organist at interim services at St. Bartholomew's Church and in the electoral Malersaal on the Ostra-Allee. On 8 October 1769, he was the organist to celebrate the inauguration of the newly built Anne's Church. He died, aged 54, in Dresden.

== Works ==
- Passion Oratorio 1748
- Cantata Der Schulmeister for bass and boys choir – July 1751 performance for the 50th anniversary of service for J. G. Gerstner
- Kantate „Nur fort ins Feld ihr tapfern Brüder"
