= Johann Joseph Fux =

Austrian composer (1660–1741)

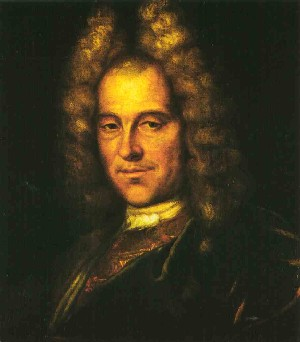
Johann Joseph Fux

Johann Joseph Fux (German: [ˈjoːhan ˈjoːzɛf ˈfʊks]; c. 1660 – 13 February 1741) was an Austrian composer, music theorist and pedagogue of the late Baroque era. His most enduring work is not a musical composition but his treatise on counterpoint, Gradus ad Parnassum, which has become the single most influential book on the Palestrinian style of Renaissance polyphony.

== Life ==
Fux's exact date of birth is unknown. He was born to a peasant family in Hirtenfeld, Styria, Austria. Relatively little is known about his early life, but likely he went to nearby Graz for music lessons. In 1680 he was accepted at the Jesuit Ferdinandeum University there, where his musical talent became apparent. From 1685 until 1688 he served as organist at St. Moritz in Ingolstadt. Sometime during this period he must have made a trip to Italy, as evidenced by the strong influence of Corelli and Bolognese composers on his work of the time.

By the 1690s he was in Vienna, and attracted the attention of Emperor Leopold I with some masses he composed; the emperor was sufficiently impressed by them to assist him with his career after this point. In 1698, Leopold hired him as court composer. Fux traveled again to Italy, studying in Rome in 1700; it may have been here that he acquired the veneration for Palestrina which was so consequential for music pedagogy.

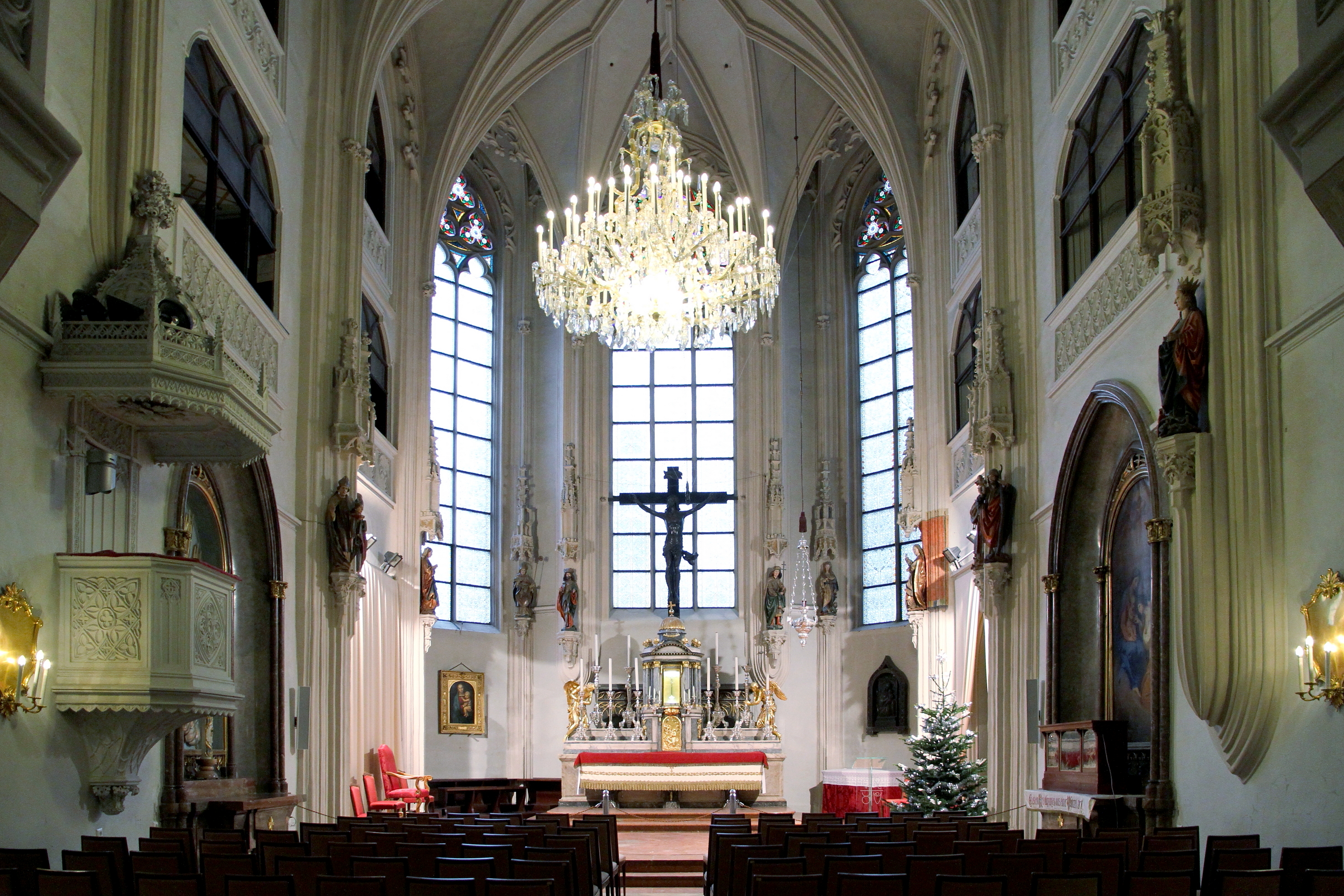
Modern image of Wien - Hofburgkapelle

Fux became the Hofkapellmeister (head musician of the Wiener Hofmusikkapelle) in 1715, along with Antonio Caldara as his vice-Kapellmeister, and F.B. Conti as the court composer. One of his students at the Wiener Hofmusikkapelle was the organist and composer Anton Karl Richter.

Fux served Leopold I until the latter's death, and two more Habsburg emperors after that: Joseph I, and Charles VI, both of whom continued to employ him in high positions in the court. Fux was famous as a composer throughout this period, and stood out among his contemporaries as the highest ranking composer in the Holy Roman Empire. However, this renown gradually became eclipsed later in the 18th century as the Baroque style died out. Although his music until recently never regained favor, his mastery of counterpoint influenced countless composers through his treatise Gradus ad Parnassum (1725). Haydn largely taught himself counterpoint by reading it and recommended it to the young Beethoven. Mozart had a copy of it that he annotated.

== Gradus ad Parnassum ==
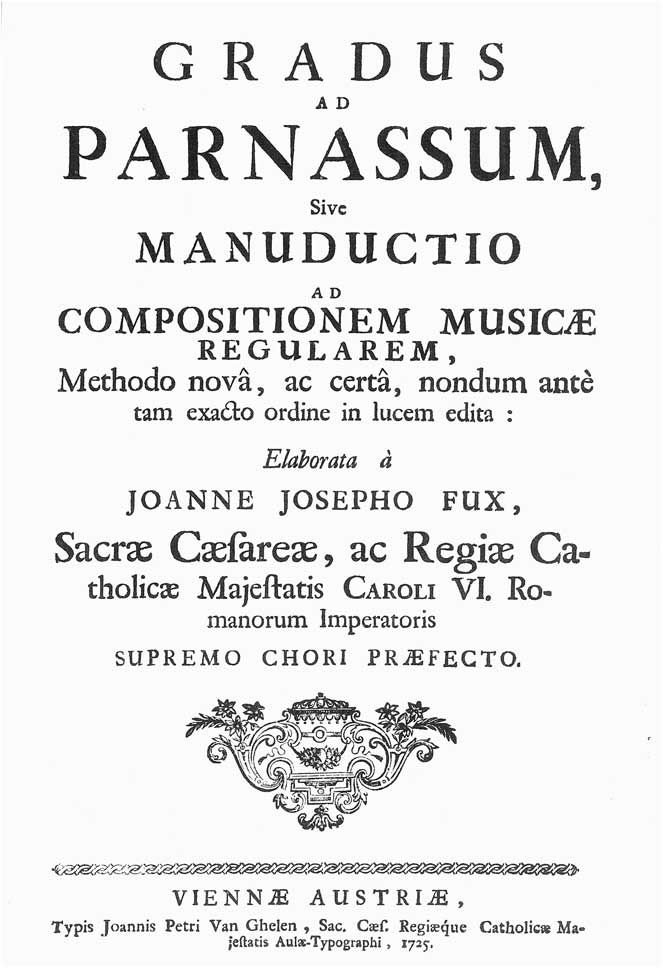
Gradus ad Parnassum, title page

The Gradus ad Parnassum (Steps or Ascent to Mount Parnassus) is a theoretical and pedagogical work written by Fux in Latin in 1725, and translated into German by Lorenz Christoph Mizler in 1742. Fux dedicated it to Emperor Charles VI.

The work is divided into two major parts. In the first part, Fux presents a summary of the theory on Musica Speculativa, or the analysis of intervals as proportions between numbers. This section is in a simple lecture style, and looks at music from a purely mathematical angle, in a theoretical tradition that goes back, through the works of Renaissance theoreticians, to the Ancient Greeks. Fux explains that intervals in exact mathematical proportions result in larger and smaller half tones, and he also mentions that some organists added extra keys (split halves to use smaller and bigger half tones), but that adding extra keys on a keyboard was problematic and for this reason they divided every note in "zwei gleiche Theile" (two equal parts), resulting in equal temperament. He continues:

Da man aber erfahren, daß solches in Zahlen nicht angeht, ist das Ohr zu hülfe genommen worden, indem man von dem einem Theil einem fast gar nicht mercklichen Theil weggenommen, und dem andern zugesetzet.
[Because experience told us that one cannot do this by means of figures, the ear was called in to help, by taking away an almost non-detectable amount from one note and adding it to the others.]

The works of Mersenne, Cicero and Aristotle are among the several references quoted by Fux in this section.

The second part, on Musica Pratica, is the section of this treatise where the author presents his instruction on counterpoint, fugue, double counterpoint, a brief essay on musical taste, and his ideas on composing sacred music, writing in the a cappella and in the recitativo style. This part is in the form of a dialog, between a master (Aloysius, Latin for Luigi, who is meant to represent Palestrina's ideas) and a student, Josephus, who represents Fux himself, a self-admitted admirer of Palestrina. At the outset, Fux states his purpose: "to invent a simple method by which a novice can progress, step by step, to attain mastery in this art." and gives his opinion of contemporary practice: "I shall not be deterred by the most ardent haters of school, nor by the corruptness of the times." He also states that theory without practice is useless, thus stressing practice over theory in his book.

While Gradus ad Parnassum is famous as the origin of the term "species counterpoint", Fux was not the first one to invent the idea. In 1610, Girolamo Diruta, a composer of the Venetian school, published Il Transilvano, which presented the Renaissance polyphonic style as a series of types: one note against one note, two notes against one note, suspensions, and so forth. Fux's work repeated some of Diruta's, possibly coincidentally, since he is not known to have had a copy.

In species counterpoint, as given in Fux, the student is to master writing counterpoint in each species before moving on to the next. The species are, in order, note against note; two notes against one; four notes against one; ligature or suspensions (one note against one, but offset by half of the note value); and florid counterpoint, in which the other species are combined freely. Once all the species are mastered in two voices, the species are gone through again in three voices, and then in four voices. (Occasionally, in modern counterpoint textbooks, the third and fourth species are reversed with suspensions being taught before four notes against one.) Fux expressed the intention of adding sections on how to write counterpoint for more than four parts, indicating that rules in this area were to be "less rigorously observed". However, citing his poor health as a result of gout and age, he chose to conclude the book as it stood.

Modern counterpoint education is greatly indebted to Gradus ad Parnassum, and Fux presented the ideas with such clarity and focus that both subsequent and modern counterpoint texts continue to cite his work, from the book by Albrechtsberger (Gründliche Anweisung zur Komposition) to 20th century examples such as the book by Knud Jeppesen (Counterpoint: The Polyphonic Vocal Style of the Sixteenth Century). Furthermore, Gradus ad Parnassum is a noteworthy historical document in that it clearly delineates the stylistic distinction of the entire baroque era between an antique and sacred style and a more modern and largely secular style.

The Latin edition of Fux's Gradus ad Parnassum from the year 1725, translated by Lorenz Christoph Mizler, is the only surviving book of J.S. Bach's personal library of theoretical works. As Mizler was a student of J.S. Bach, musicologist Christoph Wolff has suggested that Bach may have played some part in persuading Mizler to translate the treatise.

== Works ==
In addition to writing Gradus ad Parnassum, Fux also composed numerous sacred and secular works. Fux's compositions were catalogued by Ludwig Ritter von Köchel who also catalogued Mozart's works.

== Sacred compositions ==
Fux's sacred works include masses (such as Missa canonica, Missa Corporis Christi,), requiems, oratorios (including Santa Dimpna, Infanta d'Irlanda, K 300a (1702), Il fonte della salute, K 293 (1716)), litanies, Vespers settings, motets, graduals, offertories, Marian antiphons (consisting of 21 settings of Alma Redemptoris mater, 22 settings of Ave Regina, 9 of Regina coeli, and 17 of Salve regina), settings of the text "Sub Tuum Praesidium", hymns (many of which are lost), Sequences, Introits, Communion hymns, German sacred songs (all lost), and other sacred works.

Some of Fux's masses (along with Caldara and others) utilized the canon (imitative counterpoint in its strictest form) as a compositional technique, one of the telltale signs of the stile antico. Other indications of the stile antico include large note values (whole, half, or quarter notes).

However, while most associate Fux with composing in the stile antico, referring to him as the "Austrian Palestrina", due to his treatise Gradus ad Parnassum, he also had the ability to compose in the stile moderno as well, evident in his oratorios, such as Santa Dimpna, Infanta d'Irlandia. For instance, many of the movements in the second half of Santa Dimpna make use of da capo aria form, and the eight (surviving) arias demonstrate the baroque concept of the "affect", as demonstrated by the vocal coloratura and instrumental figures.

Fux, along with other composers, such as Hofer, Biber, and Caldara established a solid repertory of Catholic church music in southern Germany and Austria, despite the presence of the better-known Protestant church music in northern Germany.

== Secular compositions ==
Besides sacred works, Fux was a composer of vocal and instrumental music. His works include 19 operas, 29 partitas, 10 oratorios, and about 80 masses. Fux's instrumental compositions include 50 church sonatas, Concentus musico-instrumentalis (1710), and keyboard works. Fux's compositions for Clavier include five Partitas, a 20-minute Capriccio, a Ciaccona, an Harpeggio Prelude and Fugue, an Aria Passaggiata, and a set of twelve Minuets.

The Concentus musico-instrumentalis is a cycle of seven partitas scored for woodwind, brass, and string instruments. This cycle, published in 1701, was to Joseph, King of Rome. Its cosmopolitan admixture of French, Italian, and German movements and its festive characteristics can be found in Fux's keyboard suites, which are heavily ornamented and treble-dominated. Most Italian operas of that period were concentrated on the solo aria. Whereas, Fux's operas employ an ensemble of solo singers and the large arias often use a concertizing solo instrument. Fux's emphasis on contrapuntal structures was conservative and represented the older manner of treating musical texture.

Fux's early operas show characteristics of the late 17th century such as using arioso passages in recitatives. His style is primarily a combination of his preference for contrapuntal textures, a vivid mastery of vocal and instrumental rhetoric and Italianate ornamentation, and colorful use of obbligato scoring. Compared to his Italian contemporaries, it is Fux's manipulation of the da capo aria that represents his exceptional sense of dramma per musica: his scoring, texture, and motivic-thematic integration allow an individual style to arise while the idealized passions of the Affektenlehre attain dramatic life.

Most of his dramatic operas were premiered at the Hoftheater, Vienna; otherwise given below. List of Fux's 19 operas:

- Il fato monarchico, festa teatrale (18 Feb. 1700; music not extant)
- Neo-exoriens phosphorus, id est neo-electus et infulatus praesul Mellicensis, Latin school opera (1701; music not extant)
- L'offendere per amare ovvera La Telesilla, dramma per musica (25 June 1702; music not extant)
- La clemenza d' Augusto, poemetto drammatico (15 Nov. 1702; music not extant)
- Julo Ascanio re d'Alba, poemetto drammatico (19 March 1708)
- Pulcheria, poemetto drammatico (21 June 1708)
- Il mese di Marzo, consecrato a Marte, componimento per musica (19 March 1709)
- Gli ossequi della note, componimento per musica (15 July 1709)
- La decima fatica d'Ercolo, ovvero La Sconfitta di Gerione in Spagna, componimento pastorale-eroico (1 Oct. 1710)
- Dafne in lauro, componimento per camera (1 Oct. 1714)
- Orfeo ed Euridice, componimento da camera per musica (1 Oct. 1715)
- Angelica vincitrice di Alcina, festa teatrale (14 Sept. 1716)
- Diana placate, componimento da camera (19 Nov. 1717)
- Elisa, festa teatrale per musica (Laxenburg, 28 Aug. 1719)
- Psiche, coponimento da camera per musica (19 Nov. 1720)
- Le nozze di Aurora, festa teatrale per musica (6 Oct. 1722)
- Constanza e Fortezza, festa teatrale (Prague, 28 Aug. 1723) – his notable opera
- Giunone placata, festa teatrale per musica (19 Nov. 1725)
- La corona d'Arianna, festa teatrale (28 Aug. 1731)

The festive opera Constanza e Fortezza (Constancy and Strength), with a libretto by Pietro Pariati (1665–1733), was Fux's most notable opera. It was performed twice in a specially designed open-air theatre in Prague Castle on the occasion of the coronation of Charles VI as King of Bohemia in 1723. The set was designed by the court theatre architect Giuseppe Galli-Bibiena (1696–1756). This work is regarded as a festive coronation opera because both performances of this opera took place a few days before the coronation of Charles VI as King of Bohemia and of his consort Elisabeth Christina as Queen. There was an issue of the double celebratory function of this opera – coronation of Charles VI and Elisabeth Christina's birthday.

== Selected discography ==
- The Dresden Album. Johannes Pramsohler. Ensemble Diderot. (Audax Records ADX 13701, 2014)
- Concentus musico instrumentalis...1701. Concentus Musicus Wien, Nikolaus Harnoncourt (Telefunken SAWT 9563/64-B, 1970)
- Concentus musico instrumentalis...1701 K352 – 358. Neue Hofkapelle Graz, Lucia Froihofer and Michael Hell (CPO 777 980-2, 2016)
- Kaiserrequiem K51-53. Clemencic Consort, René Clemencic (Arte Nova 74321 27777 2, 2012)
- Alla Turca. Matthias Maute, Monika Mauch, and Ensemble Caprice. (ATMA Classique ACD2 2347, 2007)
- Complete Music for Harpsichord. Performed by Filippo Emanuele Ravizza. (Brilliant Classics 95189, 2017)

== See also ==
- List of Austrians in music

== Notes ==
Sources

- Fux, Johann Joseph; Mann, Alfred; Edmunds, John (1965). The Study of Counterpoint from Johann Joseph Fux's Gradus ad parnassum. New York: W. W. Norton. ISBN 0-393-00277-2. OCLC 494781. LCC MT40 F83 1965
