= Il trionfo dell'onore =

Opera by Alessandro Scarlatti

- Comic opera by Alessandro Scarlatti
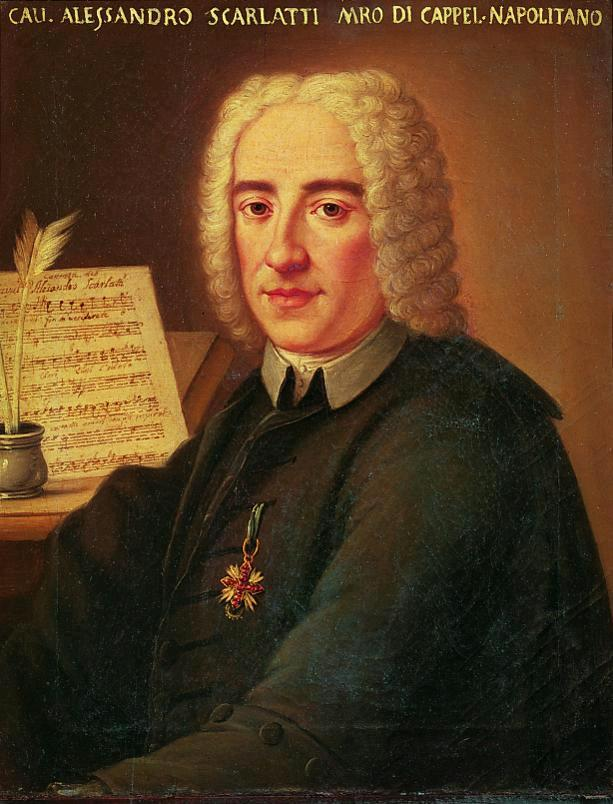
- Alessandro Scarlatti
- Translation: The Triumph of Honour
- Librettist: Francesco Antonio Tullio
- Language: Italian
- Premiere: 26 November 1718; Teatro dei Fiorentini, Naples

Il trionfo dell'onore (The Triumph of Honour) is an operatic 'commedia' in three acts by the Italian composer Alessandro Scarlatti, with a libretto by Francesco Antonio Tullio. It was first performed at the Teatro dei Fiorentini, Naples, on 26 November 1718. It is Scarlatti's only known comic opera.

== Roles ==
Roles, voice types, premiere cast
Role	Voice type	Premiere cast
Riccardo Albenori	soprano (en travesti)	Caterina Testi
Leonora Dorini	contralto	Petronilla Micheli
Erminio	soprano castrato	Biagio Stabile
Doralice Rosetti	soprano	Costanza Posterla
Flaminio Castravacca	tenor	(not known)
Cornelia Buffacci	tenor (en travesti)	Simone De Falco
Rosina Caruccia	contralto	Marianna Monti
Capitan Rodimarte Bombarda	bass	Giacomo D'Ambrosio

== Synopsis ==
=== Act 1 ===
Ricardo Albenori, a dissolute young man, and his friend, the soldier Rodimarte Bombarda, arrive in Pisa, having escaped from Lucca where they had run into trouble with the law. In Lucca, Riccardo had also seduced Leonora Dorini before rejecting her in favour of Doralice Rossetti. Leonora has followed him and takes refuge with Cornelia Buffacci, Doralice's aunt. Doralice, too, is still pursuing Riccardo, who manages to convince her he loves her.

=== Act 2 ===
Erminio, Leonora's brother who is in love with Doralice, arrives in Pisa. Leonora tells him how Riccardo, Erminio's friend, seduced her. He vows to avenge her. Leonora and Doralice quarrel over Riccardo.

=== Act 3 ===
Riccardo plans to elope with Doralice but Erminio finds him and challenges him to a duel. Riccardo is wounded, repents his dissolute life and accepts Leonora's hand in marriage.
