= Antonio Maria Bononcini =

Italian cellist and composer

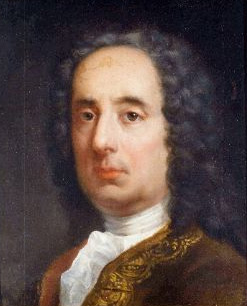
Antonio Maria Bononcini

Antonio Maria Bononcini (18 June 1677 – 8 July 1726) was an Italian cellist and composer, the younger brother of the better-known Giovanni Bononcini.

Bononcini was born and died at Modena in Italy. Like his brother, he studied with Giovanni Paolo Colonna. Between 1690 and 1693, he played in the orchestra of Cardinal Pamphili. In 1698, he composed an allegory, La fama eroica, for performance in Rome. He worked for some years with his brother, and joined him in the court orchestra at Vienna, where in 1705, he became Kapellmeister to the future Holy Roman Emperor Charles VI.

In 1713, he returned to Italy, where he worked in Milan, Naples and Modena. In 1721, he became the maestro di cappella in Modena, where he remained for the rest of his life. In addition to his stage works, he composed over 40 cantatas (most of them for solo voice and harpsichord), as well as sacred music including a Mass in G minor, a Stabat Mater in C Minor, and a Salve Regina.

== Operas ==
- Tigrane, re d'Armenia (1710)
- I veri amici (1715)
- Il tiranno eroe (1715)
- Sesostri re d'Egitto (1716)
- La conquista del vello d'oro (1717)
- Astianatte (1718)
- Griselda (1718)
- Nino (1720)
- Merope (1721)
- Endimione (1721)
- Rosiclea in Dania (1721)
