= Griselda (Antonio Maria Bononcini) =

1718 opera

- Opera by Antonio Maria Bononcini
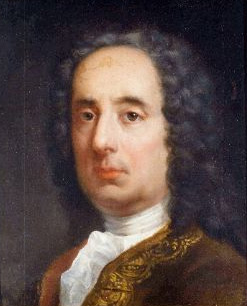
- The composer
- Librettist: Apostolo Zeno
- Language: Italian
- Based on: Boccaccio's The Decameron (X, 10, "The Patient Griselda")
- Premiere: 19 January 1718; Teatro Regio Ducale, Milan

Griselda is an opera (dramma per musica) in three acts composed by Antonio Maria Bononcini. The opera uses a slightly revised version of the 1701 Italian libretto by Apostolo Zeno that was based on Giovanni Boccaccio's The Decameron (X, 10, "The Patient Griselda"). The opera was dedicated to Prince Maximilian Karl von Löwenstein, the Austrian governor of Milan, who died during the opera's world première on 26 December 1718 at the Teatro Regio Ducale in Milan. Nevertheless, Bononcini's opera was well received and enjoyed several revivals during the eighteenth century.

His brother, Giovanni Bononcini, wrote an even more popular version of his own to Zeno's libretto in 1722.

== Roles ==
Roles, voice types, premiere cast
Role	Voice type	Premiere cast 26 December 1718
Griselda, wife of Gualtiero	soprano	Aurelia Marcello
Gualtiero, King of Thessaly	contralto (originally a castrato)	Domenico Tempesti
Roberto, brother of Corrado	soprano (en travesti)	Eleonora Scio
Corrado, Prince of Apulia	tenor	Giovanni Battista Pinacci
Costanza, missing daughter of Griselda and Gualtiero	contralto	Agata Landi
Ottone, a Sicilian nobleman	bass	Luca Mingoni

== Synopsis ==
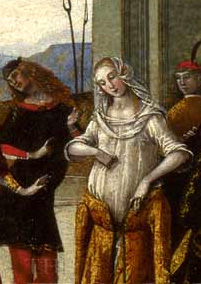
Detail from The Story of Patient Griselda, painted circa 1500

=== Act 1 ===
Years before the action begins, Gualtiero, King of Sicily, had married a poor shepherdess, Griselda. The marriage was deeply unpopular with the king's subjects and when a daughter, Costanza, was born, the king had to pretend to have her killed while secretly sending her to be brought up by Prince Corrado of Apulia. Now, faced with another rebellion from the Sicilians, Gualtiero is forced to renounce Griselda and promises to take a new wife. The proposed bride is in fact Costanza, who is unaware of her true parentage. She is in love with Corrado's younger brother, Roberto, and the thought of being forced to marry Gualtiero drives her to despair.

=== Act 2 ===
Griselda returns to her home in the countryside where she is pursued by the courtier Ottone, who is in love with her. She angrily rejects his advances. Gualtiero and his followers go out hunting and come across Griselda's cottage. Gualtiero foils an attempt by Ottone to kidnap Griselda and allows her back to the court, but only as Costanza's slave.

=== Act 3 ===
Ottone still resolutely pursues Griselda and Gualtiero promises him her hand as soon as he himself has married Costanza. Griselda declares she would rather die and, moved by her faithfulness, Gualtiero takes her back as his wife. He reveals the true identity of Costanza and allows her to marry Roberto.
