= Francesco Bartolomeo Conti =

Italian composer

Francesco Bartolomeo Conti (20 January 1682 – 19 July 1732) was an Italian composer and player of the mandolin and theorbo.

Little is known about the biography of Conti. He was born in Florence, Italy. By 1700, he was already known as a theorbist not only in his native Florence, but also in other cities such as Ferrara and Milan. The fame he enjoyed by 1701 enabled him to obtain appointment as an auxiliary theorbist at the Habsburg court in Vienna with the same salary as the main theorbist, Orazio Clementi. At the 1706 carnival, he made his debut as an opera composer with Cleotide, and in 1713, he was appointed as a court composer.

In 1708, with the death of Clementi, Conti was promoted senior theorbist, a position he held until 1726. In the same year, he was elected a member of the Accademia Filarmonica of Bologna and in 1711, he was appointed vice-Kapellmeister (vice-maestro di cappella) in Vienna. In April of that year, after the death of his first wife, Theresia Kugler, Conti remarried to the prima donna Maria Landini, at that time the highest-paid singer in Vienna. She sang the main soprano roles in Conti's operas from 1714 and 1721, but died in 1722. After her death, Anna Maria Lorenzani was appointed prima donna and performed in three more of Conti's operas. She became his third wife in April 1725.

On 28 August 1723, Conti, as theorbist, took part in the first performance of the festival opera Costanza e Fortezza by Johann Joseph Fux. In 1726 and again during 1729 to 1732, Conti visited Italy because of health problems. He returned to Vienna in 1732, where he staged two new operas but in July of the same year he died. He was succeeded by his son Ignazio Conti (Vienna 1706-1759).

Although Il mio bel foco (Quella fiamma) has long been attributed to Venetian composer and statesman Benedetto Marcello (1686-1739), some now identify Conti as the likely composer of this lovely song.

Conti was also a supreme player of the 4- and 5-course baroque mandolino, and wrote one of the earliest sonatas for the instrument ("Sonata al mandolino solo dal Signor Francesco Contini"), which is now preserved at the Lobkowicz Library & Archive, in Nelahozeves (Czech Republic). His works composed between 1714 and 1725 were primarily written for the carnival season or to celebrate birthdays and name days of the members of the Imperial family.

Handel reused some of Conti's music for Cleotide in his pasticcio Ormisda (1730) performed at the Queen's Theatre. His music was also appreciated by Johann Sebastian Bach, and Conti's cantata Languet anima mea, survives in a manuscript version from 1716 as arranged by Bach (BWV deest 1006).

In 1739, Mattheson in his Der vollkommene Capellmeister, Part I, Chapter six, Nr.48 writes about him:

Excerpt from a Letter from Regensburg of October 19, 1730. "On September 10 in Vienna the Imperial Compositore di Musica, Francesco Conti, was expelled from St. Stephan's Cathedral by virtue of an excommunication pronounced on him by the local Consistorio. His Imperial Majesty had reduced the imposed standing from thrice to once out of innate kindness; but since then the man behaved very badly the first time, in the view of many hundreds of persons, as he did the second time on September 17 when placed before the doors of said church for an hour in a long hairy coat, called a coat of penance, between twelve guards who formed a circle around him while he held a burning black candle in his hand; the same thing is also to occur on the 24th. His food is bread and water as long as he remains under the ecclesiastical authority; after transfer to the secular he is to pay the priest who was beaten by him 1,000 guilders in compensation as well as expenses, then remain in jail for four years and subsequently be banned from Austria forever: since as he stood in front of the church doors the first time he used a very uncivil and vexatious effrontery (i.e., he used his art of gesticulation in a most wicked manner). The said court-Compositeur has been sentenced to such punishment because he laid violent hands on a priest and beat him up severely.

The following epigram has been made about him:

"It is not good Muse, nor Music, which you have composed Conti, for that was a heavy touch: And the bass is too heavy, and the key is not harmonious: Hence as a result you bear black marks forever."

== Works ==
16 operas, including:

- Cleotide (1706)
- Don Chisciotte in Sierra Morena (1719)
- Teseo in Creta.

His other stage works are: Il trionfo dell'amicizia e dell'amore(1711), Circe fatta saggia(1713), Alba Cornelia(1714), I Sattiri in Arcadia(1714), Ciro(1715), Il finto Policare(1716), Sesostri, re di Egitto(1717), Vespetto e Milo(intermezzo 1717), Amore in Tessaglia(1718), Astarto(1718), Galatea venedicata(1719 revised in 1724), Cloris und Thyrsis(1719), Alessandro in Sidone(1721), La via del saggio(1721), Archelao, Re di Cappadocia(1722), Pallade Triofante(1722) Creso(1723), Il trionfo della fama(1723), Penelope(1724) Meleagro(1724), Griselda(1725), Il contrasto della Belezza e el Tempo(1726), Issicratea(1726), L'ammalato immaginario(intermezzo 1727) and Issipile(1732)

9 oratorios, including:

- Il David perseguitato da Saul (1723) libretto by A. di Avanzo.
- David (1724) azione sacra per musica.

50 cantatas

== Selected recordings ==
- Oratorio: David. Marijana Mijanovic, Simone Kermes, Birgit Christensen, Sonia Prina, Furio Zanasi, Vito Priante, Il Complesso Barocco, dir. Alan Curtis. Virgin Classics, 2006
- Cantatas: Sventurata Didone. Fra cetre e fra trombe. Overtures. Ulrike Hofbauer, Neue Hofkapelle München, dir. Hammer ORF, 2005
- Cantatas: Lontananza dell'amato. Ride il prato. Con più lucidi candori. Vaghi augelletti. Bernarda Fink, Ars Antiqua Austria, dir. Letzbor. Arcana.
- Cantatas: Lontananza dell'amato. Ride il prato. Con più lucidi candori. Vaghi augelletti. Rossana Bertini. Tactus.
