= Wenzel Raimund Birck =

Austrian composer

Wenzel Raimund Johann Birck (also spelled "Pirck", "Birk", "Birckh", "Pirckh", "Pürk", and "Pürck") (1718–1763) was one of the early proponents of Symphonic music in Vienna, along with Georg Christoph Wagenseil and Georg Matthias Monn, and an early tutor for Mozart. Birck also, along with Georg Christoph Wagenseil tutored a young Joseph Haydn. He was the court organist for Maria Theresia and the music teacher for emperor Joseph II.

== See also ==
- Wolfgang Amadeus Mozart
- Symphony
