= Apostolo Zeno =

Venetian poet (1668–1750)

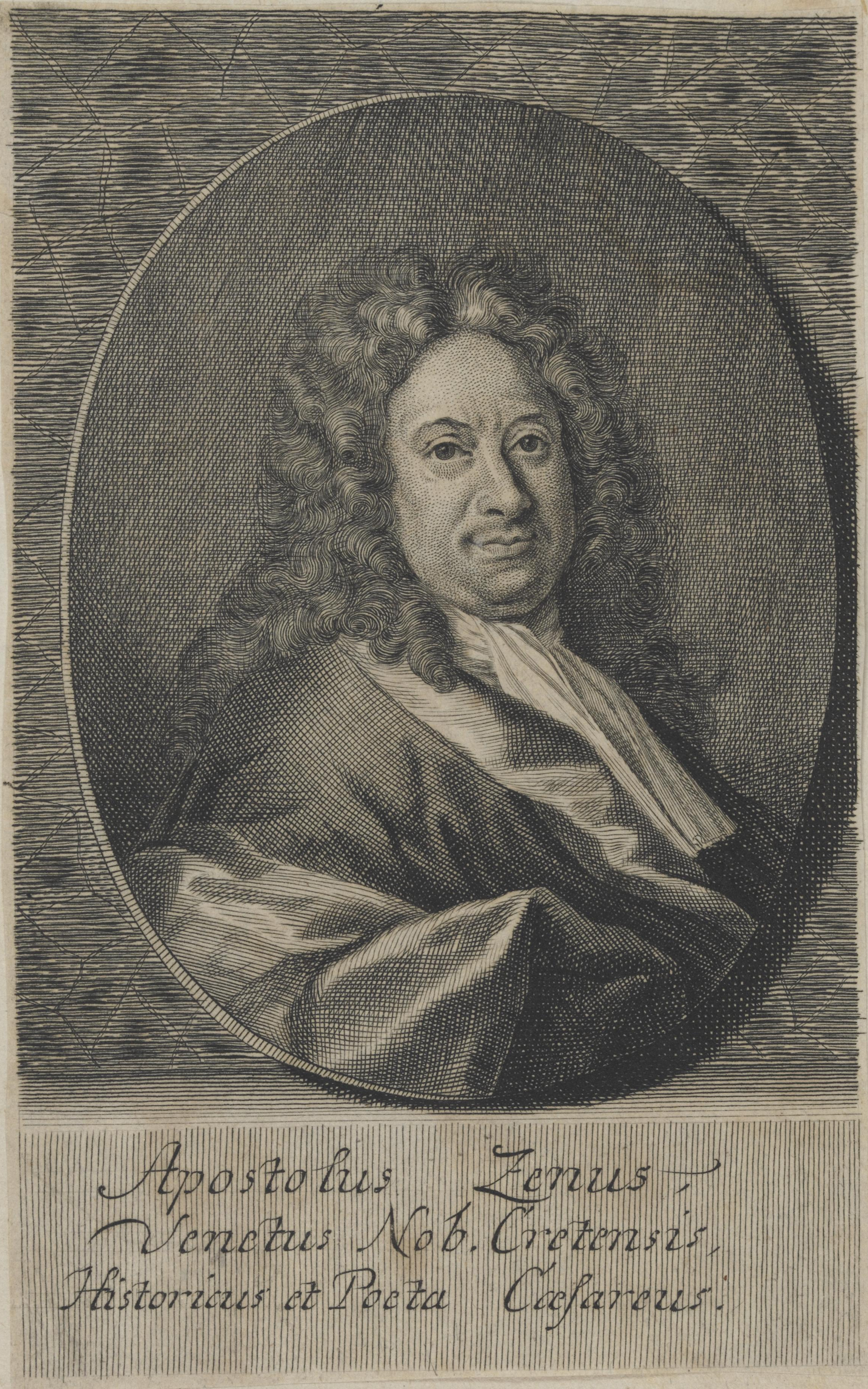
- Zeno by Martin Bernigeroth, 1721
- Born: 11 December 1668; Venice, Republic of Venice
- Died: 11 November 1750 (aged 81); Venice, Republic of Venice
- Burial place: Gesuati
- Occupations: Poet, librettist, journalist, numismatist and man of letters
- Known for: Reform of melodrama
- Spouse: Ludovica Mondonovo (m. 1705)
- Parent(s): Pietro Zeno and Caterina Zeno (née Sevastò)
- Family: Zeno family

Academic background
- Education: Collegio di Castello
- Influences: Euripides; Racine

Academic work
- Influenced: Muratori; Gozzi; Metastasio; Goldoni; Gamerra

Apostolo Zeno (11 December 1668 – 11 November 1750) was a Venetian poet, dramatist and scholar, known for his contributions to the development of opera seria and his role in the early eighteenth-century Italian literary scene.

== Early life ==
Apostolo Zeno was born in Venice to a colonial branch of the Zeno family, an ancient Venetian patrician family. His family had been transplanted from Venice to the Kingdom of Candia in the 13th century in order to maintain Venetian order and suppress any rebellious subjects. Following the assault on the island by the Ottoman Empire, the remaining members of his family returned to Venice. Upon return, they were not readmitted to the patrician class, but were only able to obtain status as ordinary citizens. His father was Pietro Zeno, a doctor of medicine, and his mother, Caterina Sevasto, belonged to an illustrious and powerful family from Candia, Crete. Having lost his father at an early age, he was left to the care of his mother, who remarried to Venetian senator Pier Antonio Cornaro. His education was entrusted to the Somaschi Fathers.

Zeno was in 1691 among the founders of the Accademia degli Animosi. In 1695, he composed his first libretto, Gli inganni felici, which obtained great success, making him a fashionable librettist. He earned the praise of the crowds of Venetian and foreign visitors who heard his dramas performed during carnival at the theatres of San Cassian and San Giovanni Grisostomo. His compositions were all greeted with repeat performances all over Italy. From 1705, he worked with Pietro Pariati, keeping the theatrical scenes for himself and leaving to Pariati the composition of the libretti.

In 1718, Zeno was called to Vienna to serve as the poet laureate for the Habsburg court. He remained in Vienna until 1729, at which point he was replaced by Pietro Metastasio. After his return to Venice, he dedicated himself to works of erudition and to numismatics. In his later years, he published several important scholarly works, most notably the Dissertazioni vossiane, additions and corrections to Gerardus Vossius' De historicis latinis. Zeno died in Venice on 11 November 1750. His Annotazioni to Giusto Fontanini's Biblioteca dell'eloquenza italiana were published posthumously in 1753. Zeno's rich library was bequeathed to the Dominicans of the Gesuati on the Zattere in Venice, and on the suppression of that monastery in 1810, it passed to the Biblioteca Marciana.

== Works ==
=== Journalism ===
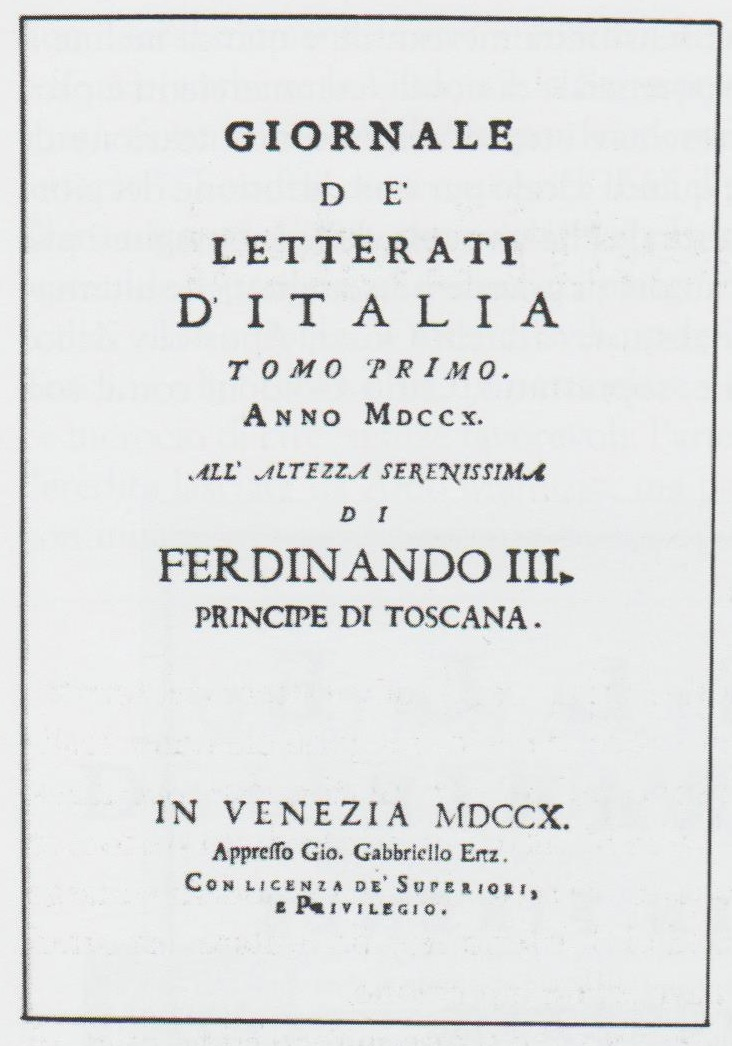
Title page of the first volume of the Giornale de' letterati d'Italia

A polymath and a bibliophile, Zeno wrote prolifically on many topics, translated classics into Italian and composed poetry and opera libretti. He began work as a literary journalist for the Galleria di Minerva, also taking upon executive responsibilities, but distanced himself when he realised that he had not succeeded in making the impact upon the publication that he intended.

In 1710, together with Scipione Maffei, Antonio Vallisneri and his brother, Pier Caterino Zeno, he founded the Giornale de' letterati d'Italia (The Journal of Italian Letters), maintaining that it was necessary that "Italians themselves make their own newspaper... revealing that good sense, erudition and ingenuity never were lacking among us, and now more than ever are they flourishing." The tri-monthly publication had prestigious contributors such as Eustachio Manfredi, Ludovico Antonio Muratori, Giovanni Battista Morgagni, Giovan Battista Vico, Bernardino Ramazzini. Motivated above all by the desire to improve Italian learning, it enjoyed considerable success.

When Apostolo Zeno was called to duty as poet laureate to the imperial court of Vienna in 1718, his brother, Pier Caterino, took over the direction until 1732, publishing the periodical annually.

=== Historical works ===
Zeno was thoroughly familiar with all the latest contributions to diplomatics made by Mabillon, Dom Thierry Ruinart, Étienne Baluze, Adrien de Valois and Ezekiel Spanheim as well as those by Bacchini and Muratori. In 1700, he provided a translation of Pierre Le Lorrain de Vallemont's Les éléments de l'histoire (1696) for the benefit of Italians. In the preface of his translation, he called for a return to the historiographical models that had been authoritative during the Renaissance: namely, Machiavelli and Guicciardini.

In 1702, Zeno found the perfect opportunity to put his theories into practice. The Mappamondo istorico or universal history of Jesuit rhetorician and historian Antonio Foresti had been left unfinished at its author's death in 1692. One of the most thorough works of its kind, it had already run into 6 volumes, covering ancient Greece, Rome, Persia, the popes and the Holy Roman Empire. That made it far more comprehensive than such recent one-volume essays in the genre as Walter Raleigh's History of the World (1652), Georgius Hornius's Orbis politicus (1668), Samuel von Pufendorf's Einleitung zu der Historie der vornehmsten Reiche (1684) or Peter Heylyn's Cosmography (1689). It was even longer than the last important Italian essay, Giovanni Tarcagnota's five-volume Delle istorie del mondo (1580). Now it was to be completed and republished by the Venetian firm of Girolamo Albrizzi.

Adopting the approach of Tarcagnota's early seventeenth-century editors, later repeated by William Temple in 1695 for a History of England, Albrizzi assigned the new sections to a team of expert writers. He gave Egypt to Domenico Suarez of Mantua, China to Vittore Silvio Grandi of Venice; and he gave England, Scotland, Denmark, Sweden, the Duchy of Holstein and the counties of Guelders to Apostolo Zeno. The finished work promised to fill an important gap in popular historiography and to achieve considerable sales among educated readers.

In scholarship, Zeno far outdid Foresti, who was not above repeating the popular myth about the fall of Belisarius (already rejected by the sixteenth-century historian Crinitus). He also outdid the rest of the collaborators. Unlike them, he followed the Renaissance humanists in discarding the awkward Christianized version of the Book of Daniel's four-monarchy scheme, which divided universal history into the periods of Babylon, Persia, Greece, and Rome, distantly succeeded by the kingdom of heaven. He didn't treat the Holy Roman Empire as the logical extension of Rome into the modern world, so he could quietly divide the section on the third monarchy into separate volumes on each of the Northern kingdoms. And in order to avoid the dizzying complexities of a straight narrative presentation of hundreds of years of documented history, he followed Renaissance historian Paolo Emilio – who wrote on France – in adopting the Suetonian model of a series of biographies.

=== Libretti ===
Zeno wrote the libretti for 36 operas with historical and mythological themes, including Temistocle (1701), Ambleto (1706), Teuzzone (1719), Merope (1734) and Sesostri re d'Egitto (Prague edition 1760) as well as 17 oratorios, including Giuseppe (1722), Gioaz (1726), David umiliato (1731). The total number of librettos written by him is 71; they were collected and edited by Gasparo Gozzi as Poesie drammatiche di Apostolo Zeno (10 vols., Venice, 1744; reprinted in 11 vols., Orléans, 1785-86).

== Critical evaluation ==
From the condemnation of the unrealistic and exaggerated elements of melodrama a demand was born for greater verisimilitude in plots and for literary dignity in texts. Zeno was the first to undertake reform to make melodrama more sober, according to the Arcadian principles, developed further by Metastasio. Inspired by French tragedians, he respected, as they did, the rule of the unity of time and space. He reduced the number of characters and scenes and eliminated comic roles, constructing his works so that they could be presented also without music.

Francesco de Sanctis, referring to Metastasio, wrote that "if we look at the structure, his drama is constructed in the fashion which Apostolo Zeno already demonstrated. But the structure is only a simple skeleton. Metastasio breathed into that skeleton the grace and the romance of a happy and harmonious life. He was the poet of melodrama; Zeno was the architect."

== Sources ==
- Bettoni, Nicolò (1822). Vite e ritratti di uomini celebri di tutti i tempi e di tutte le nazioni. Vol. X. Milan: Per Nicolò Bettoni.
- Zeno, Apostolo (1929). Drammi scelti. Scrittori d'Italia Laterza. Vol. 117. Bari: Laterza.
- Maylender, Michele (1926). Storia delle accademie d'Italia (PDF). Vol. 1. Bologna: Licinio Cappelli. pp. 205–8.
- "Zeno, Apostolo". Baker's Biographical Dictionary of Musicians. New York: G. Schirmer. 1958. pp. 1843–4.
- Freeman, Robert (1968). "Apostolo Zeno's Reform of the Libretto". Journal of the American Musicological Society. 21 (3): 321–41. doi:10.2307/830538. JSTOR 830538.
- Corrigan, Beatrice (1977). "Reform and Innovation: The Libretti of Apostolo Zeno". Italica. 54 (1): 3–11. doi:10.2307/478116. JSTOR 478116.
- Generali, Dario (1990). "Pier Caterino Zeno e le vicende culturali del «Giornale de'letterati d'Italia» attraverso il regesto della sua corrispondenza". In Maria Vittoria Predaval Magrini (ed.). Scienza, filosofia e religione tra '600 e '700 in Italia. Ricerche sui rapporti tra cultura italiana ed europea. Milan: Franco Angeli. pp. 119–202.
- Dooley, Brendan Maurice (1991). Science, Politics, and Society in Eighteenth-century Italy: The Giornale De' Letterati D'Italia and Its World. New York: Garland.
- Raizen, Karen T. (2016). "Apostolo Zeno and the "Tre Corone": Old Heroes for the New Stage". Italica. 93 (4): 677–92. JSTOR 44504612.
- Bizzarini, Marco (2020). "ZENO, Apostolo". Dizionario Biografico degli Italiani (in Italian). Vol. 100: Vittorio Emanuele I–Zurlo. Rome: Istituto dell'Enciclopedia Italiana. ISBN 978-88-12-00032-6.
