= List of works premiered at the Teatro Capranica =

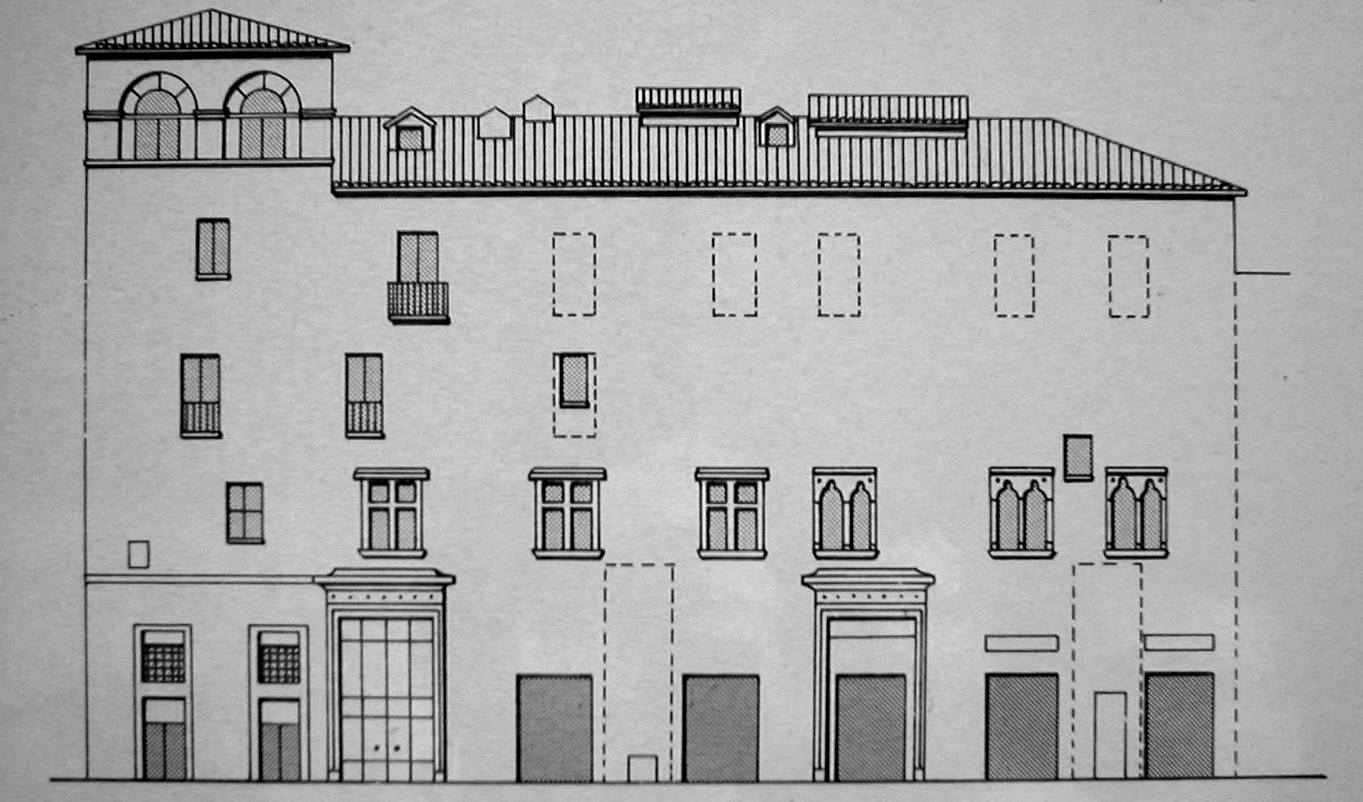
Facade of the Palazzo Capranica, the 16th-century palace in which the theatre was housed

This is a chronological list of works known to have premiered at the Teatro Capranica in Rome. While the vast majority are operas, the list also includes oratorios, cantatas, and plays. The Capranica was originally built as a private theatre in 1679 and converted into a public theatre in 1694. The theatre was closed from 1699 to 1711 when there was a papal ban on public secular performances in Rome. There were other shorter periods of closure in the 18th and 19th centuries, and it definitively ceased operating as a full-scale theatre and opera house in 1881. In a much altered state, it now serves as a conference and event venue.

== Premieres ==
=== 17th century ===
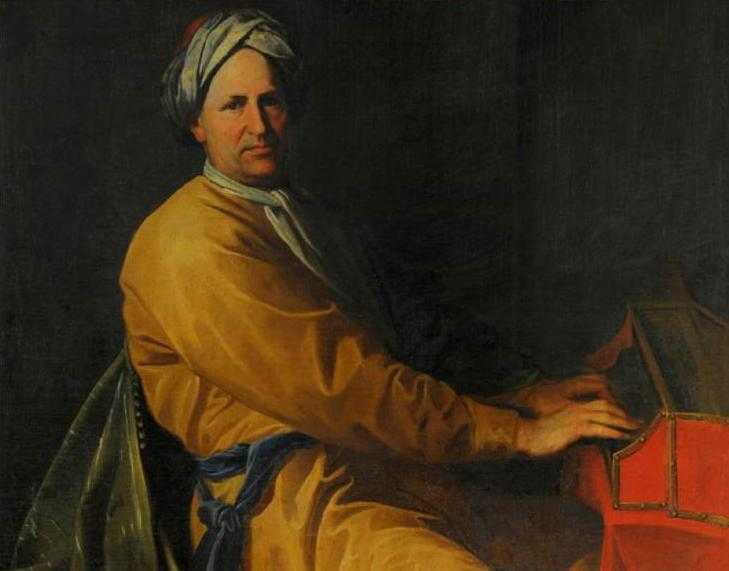
Portrait of Bernardo Pasquini by Andrea Pozzo. Pasquini's opera Dov'è amore è pietà inaugurated the Teatro Capranica in 1679.

- Bernardo Pasquini's Dov'è amore è pietà; opera (dramma per musica); libretto by Cristoforo Ivanovich; 6 January 1679
- Alessandro Scarlatti's Gli equivoci nel sembiante ovvero L'errore innocente; opera (dramma pastorale) in 3 acts; libretto by Domenico Filippo Contini; 5 February 1679 (first public performance)
- Bernardo Pasquini's L'Idalma, overo Chi la dura la vince; opera (commedia per musica); libretto by Giuseppe Domenico de Totis; 6 February 1680
- Francesco Gasparini's Amor vince lo sdegno ovvero L'Olimpia placata; opera (dramma per musica) in 3 acts; libretto by Aurelio Aureli; 9 February 1692
- Alessandro Scarlatti's Il nemico di se stesso; opera (dramma per musica) in three acts; libretto anonymous; 24 January 1693
- Alessandro Scarlatti's La Teodora Augusta (revised version), opera (dramma per musica) in 3 acts; libretto by Adriano Morselli; 4 January 1693
- Lulier, Gaffi, and Cesarini's Clearco in Negroponte, opera (dramma per musica) in 3 acts; libretto by Novello de Bonis; 18 January 1695
- Alessandro Scarlatti's Il Flavio Cuniberto; opera (dramma per musica) in 3 acts; libretto by Matteo Noris; Carnival season, 1696
- Bernardo Sabadini's L'Eusonia overo La dama stravagante; opera (dramma per musica) in 3 acts; libretto by Matteo Noris, Carnival season, 1697

=== 18th century ===
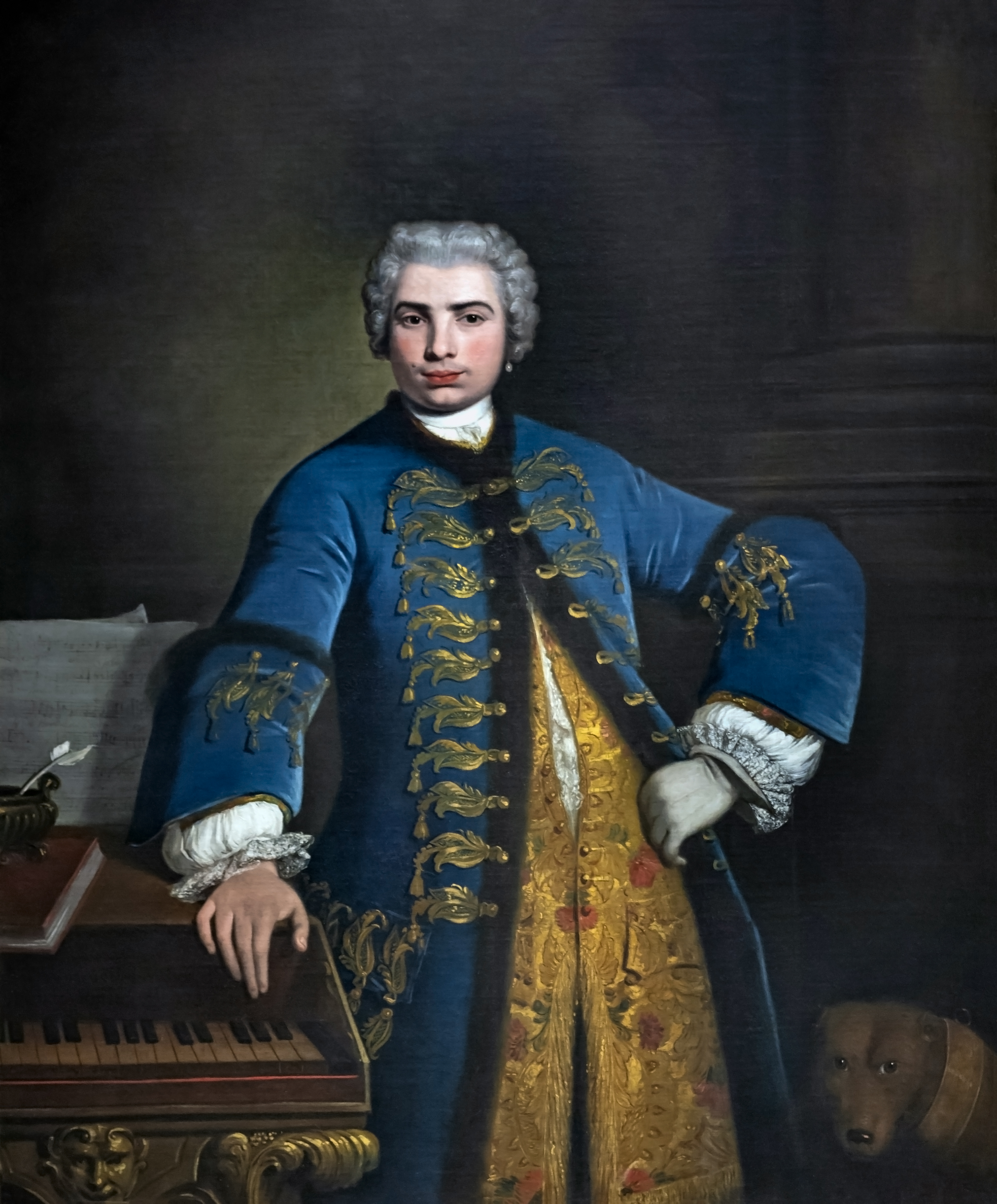
Portrait of the celebrated castrato singer Farinelli by Bartolomeo Nazari. Farinelli sang many times at the Capranica, including the 1728 premiere of L'isola di Alcina composed by his brother Riccardo Broschi.

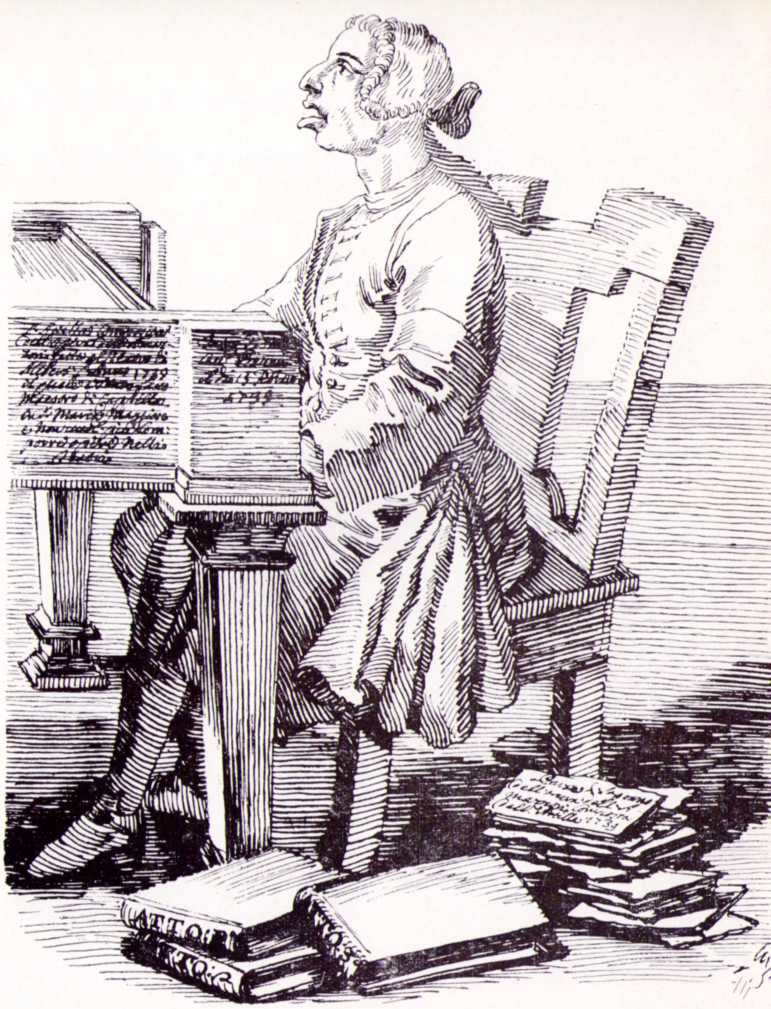
Caricature of Gaetano Latilla by Pier Leone Ghezzi. Latilla's Tito Manlio was one of the last in the opera seria genre to be premiered at the Capranica. He was the uncle of Niccolò Piccinni, several of whose comic operas premiered at the Capranica in the late 1760s.

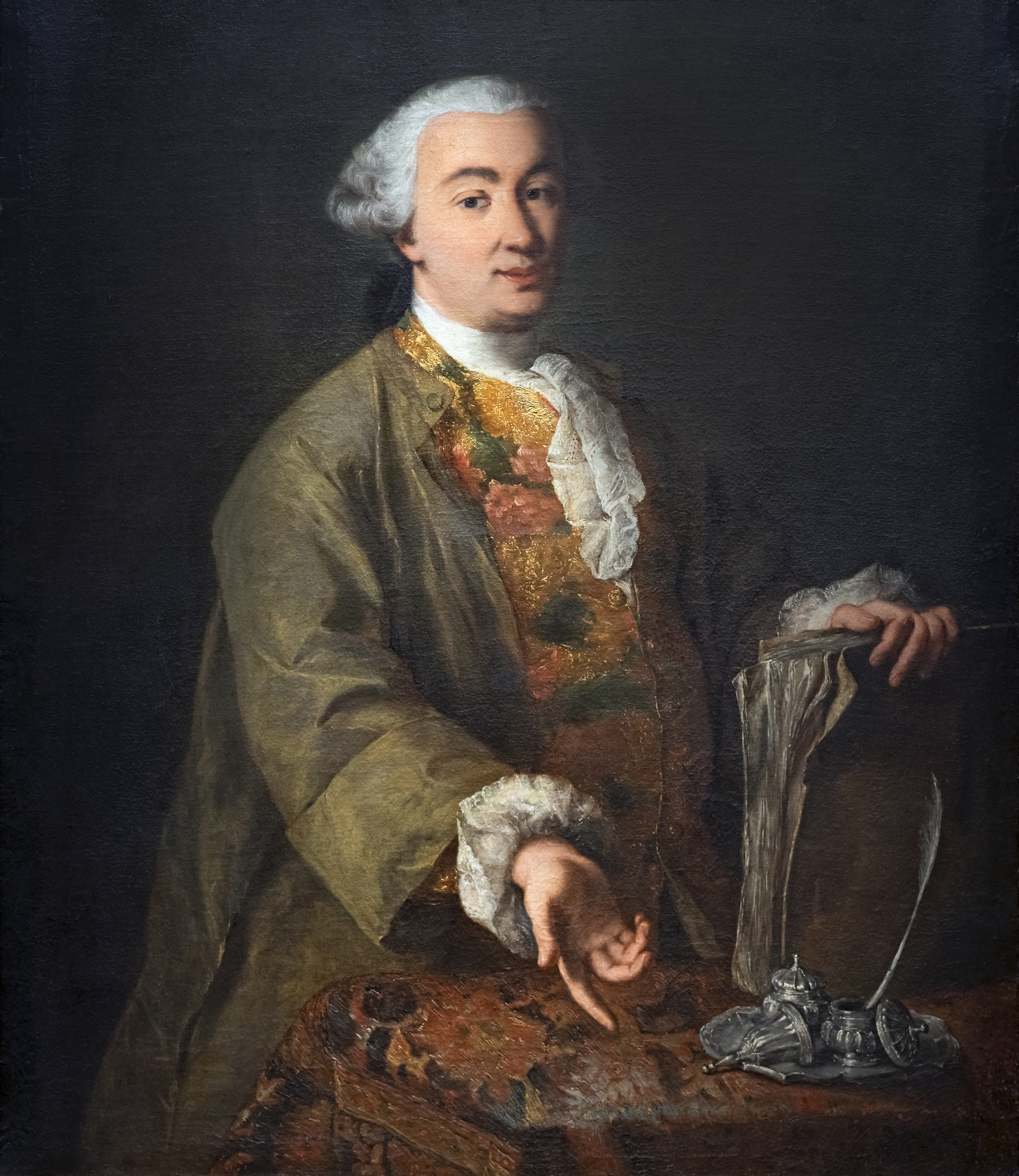
Portrait of Carlo Goldoni by Alessandro Longhi. Goldoni wrote his 1760 play Pamela Maritata expressly for the Capranica

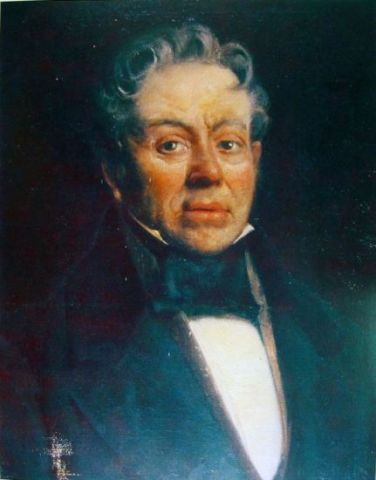
Portrait of Valentino Fioravanti by Achille Talarico. Fioravanti's comic operas, three of which premiered at the Capranica, were typical of the theatre's operatic repertoire in the late 18th century.

- Antonio Caldara's Tito e Berenice; opera (dramma per musica) in 3 acts; libretto Carlo Sigismondo Capece; 10 January 1714
- Francesco Gasparini's Lucio Papirio; opera (dramma per musica) in 3 acts; libretto by Antonio Salvi; 27 January 1714
- Alessandro Scarlatti's Telemaco; opera (dramma per musica) in 3 acts; libretto by Carlo Sigismondo Capece; Carnival season, 1718
- Alessandro Scarlatti's Talor per suo diletto; cantata, 28 April 1718,
- Alessandro Scarlatti's Su la sponda fiorita di limpido ruscello; cantata; 20 August 1718
- Alessandro Scarlatti's Marco Attilio Regolo; opera (dramma per musica) in 3 acts; libretto by Matteo Noris; Carnival season, 1719
- Alessandro Scarlatti's La gloriosa gara tra la Santità e la Sapienza; oratorio; 13 June 1720
- Alessandro Scarlatti's Matilde, alma mia, se udiste mai; cantata; 3 July 1720
- Alessandro Scarlatti's Benedicta et venerabilis es; motet for 4 voices and strings; 4 July 1720
- Alessandro Scarlatti's Regie soglie, alte moli; cantata; 18 October 1720
- Alessandro Scarlatti's Non più contrasti, no; cantata; 6 October 1721
- Alessandro Scarlatti's Dolce sonno, oblio dei malicantata; cantata; 16 November 1721
- Alessandro Scarlatti's Griselda; opera (dramma per musica) in 3 acts; libretto by Francesco Maria Ruspoli; January, 1721
- Giuseppe Maria Orlandini's Nino; opera (dramma per musica) in 3 acts; libretto by Ippolito Zanelli; 7 January 1722
- Benedetto Micheli's Oreste; opera (dramma per musica) in 3 acts; libretto by Giovanni Gualberto Barlocci; 28 December 1722
- Antonio Vivaldi's Ercole su'l Termodonte; opera (dramma per musica) in 3 acts; libretto by Giacomo Francesco Bussani; 23 January 1723
- Tommaso Redi's In passioni Domini; cantata; 23 March 1723
- Antonio Vivaldi's Giustino; opera (dramma per musica) in 3 acts; libretto by Nicolò Beregan; Carnival season, 1724
- Leonardo Leo's Il trionfo di Camilla, regina dei Volsci; opera (dramma per musica) in 3 acts; libretto by Silvio Stampiglia; 8 January 1726
- Tomaso Albinoni's La Statira; opera (dramma per musica) in 3 acts; libretto by Apostolo Zeno and Pietro Pariati; Carnival season, 1726
- Tommaso Albinoni's Malsazio e Fiammetta opera (intermezzo); libretto anonymous; (premiered with La Statira) Carnival season, 1726
- Giovanni Battista Costanzi's L'amor generoso; opera (dramma per musica) in 3 acts; libretto by Giuseppe Polvini after Apostolo Zeno; 7 January 1727
- Leonardo Leo's Il Cid; opera (dramma per musica) in 3 acts; libretto by Giovanni Giacomo Alborghetti, 10 February 1727
- Riccardo Broschi's L'isola di Alcina; opera (dramma per musica) in 3 acts; libretto by Antonio Fanzaglia; 31 January 1728
- Giovanni Fischietti's La costanza; opera (commedia per musica) in 3 acts; libretto by Bernardo Saddumene; 7 February 1729
- Nicola Porpora's Mitridate (2° version); opera (dramma per musica) in 3 acts; libretto by Filippo Vanstryp; 7 January 1730
- Michele Caballone's Adone re di Cipro; opera (dramma per musica) in 3 acts; libretto by Filippo Vanstryp; 8 December 1730
- Geminiano Giacomelli's Annibale; opera (dramma per musica) in 3 acts; libretto by Filippo Vanstrypp; 27 January 1731
- Johann Adolph Hasse's Cajo Fabricio; opera (dramma per musica) in 3 acts; libretto by Filippo Vanstryp; 12 January 1732
- Giuseppe Scarlatti's La Santissima Vergine Annunziata; oratorio; 12 March 1739
- Giuseppe Scarlatti's Merope; opera (dramma per musica) in 3 acts; libretto by Apostolo Zeno; 23 January 1740
- Giuseppe Sellitto's Sesostri, re d'Egitto opera (dramma per musica) in 3 acts; libretto by Pietro Pariati after Apostolo Zeno; 2 January 1742
- Giuseppe Arena and Giuseppe Sellitto's Farnace, opera (dramma per musica) in 3 acts; libretto by Antonio Maria Lucchini; 23 January 1742
- Nicola Conti's Berenice; opera (dramma per musica) in 3 acts; libretto by Bartolomeo Vitturi; 7 January 1743
- Rinaldo di Capua's Turno Heredonio Aricino; opera (dramma per musica) in 3 acts; libretto by Silvio Stampiglia after Metastasio; 11 December 1743
- Baldassarre Galuppi's Evergete; opera (dramma per musica) in 3 acts; libretto by Francesco Silvani and Giovanni Boldini; 2 January 1747
- Gaetano Latilla's Catone in Utica; opera (dramma per musica) in 3 acts; libretto by Metastasio; 30 January 1747
- Antonio Gaetano Pampani's Eurione; opera (opera seria) in 3 acts; libretto by Antonio Papi 8 January 1754
- Giuseppe Scolari's Cajo Fabricio; opera (dramma per musica) in 3 acts; libretto by Apostolo Zeno; 2 January 1755
- Gaetano Latilla's Tito Manlio; opera (dramma per musica) in 3 acts; libretto by Gaetano Roccaforte; 22 January 1755
- Baldassarre Galuppi's La cantarina; opera (farsetta); libretto by Carlo Goldoni; 26 February 1756
- Antonio Sacchini and Giacomo Insanguine's Il monte Testaccio; opera (intermezzi); libretto by Carlo Goldoni; (performed with Goldoni's play La moglie saggia) 8 January 1760
- Carlo Goldoni's Pamela maritata; play (prose comedy) in 3 acts; February 1760
- Antonio Sacchini's La vendemmia; opera (intermezzo); libretto by Carlo Goldoni; 2 February 1760
- Niccolò Piccinni's Il barone di Torreforte; opera (intermezzo farsetta) in 2 acts; libretto anonymous; 10 January 1765
- Niccolò Piccinni's La pescatrice ovvero L'erede riconosciuta; opera (intermezzo farsetta) in 2 acts; libretto by Carlo Goldoni; 9 January 1766
- Niccolò Piccinni's La baronessa di Montecupo; opera (intermezzo farsetta); libretto anonymous; 27 January 1766
- Niccolò Piccinni's La donna di spirito; opera (commedia in musica in 3 acts; libretto by Marcello Bernardini after Goldoni; 13 February 1770
- Alessandro Felici's La donna di spirito; opera (farsetta) in 1 act, libretto by Marcello Bernardini; (premiered with Piccinni's La donna di spirito) 13 February 1770
- Giovanni Paisiello's Semiramide in villa; opera (intermezzo) in 2 acts; libretto anonymous (parody of Metastasio's Semiramide riconosciuta); Carnival season, 1772
- Giuseppe Gazzaniga's La finta folletto o Lo spirito folletto; opera (opera buffa) in 2 acts; libretto anonymous; 29 December 1778
- Gaetano Monti's La contadina accorta opera (intermezzo) in 2 acts; 4 January 1781
- Angelo Tarchi's Le cose d'oggi giorno divise in trenta tomi, tomo primo, parte prima; opera (intermezzo); libretto anonymous; 26 December 1784
- Vincenzo Fabrizi's La sposa invisibile; opera (farsetta); libretto anonymous; 20 February 1786
- Vincenzo Fabrizi's La nobiltà villana; opera (opera buffa); libretto anonymous; 30 January 1787
- Valentino Fioravanti's Il fabbro parigino o sia La schiava fortunata; opera (opera buffa) in 2 acts; libretto by Luigi Romanelli; 9 January 1789
- Valentino Fioravanti's La famiglia stravagante; opera (opera buffa) in 2 acts; libretto by Giuseppe Petrosellini; 3 February 1792
- Valentino Fioravanti's La cantatrice bizarra; opera (opera buffa) in 2 acts; libretto anonymous; 26 December 1795
