= Basili =

Basili is an Italian surname. Notable people with the name include:

== Surname ==
- Andrea Basili (1705–1777), Italian composer and music theorist
- Basilio Basili (1804–1895), Italian tenor and composer
- Francesco Basili (1767–1850), Italian composer and conductor
- Pier Angelo Basili (1550–1604), Italian painter
- Victor Basili (born 1940), American computer scientist

== Given name ==
- Basili Sabatsmindeli (8th century), Georgian calligrapher, monk and writer
