= Echo and Narcissus =

Story in Greek mythology

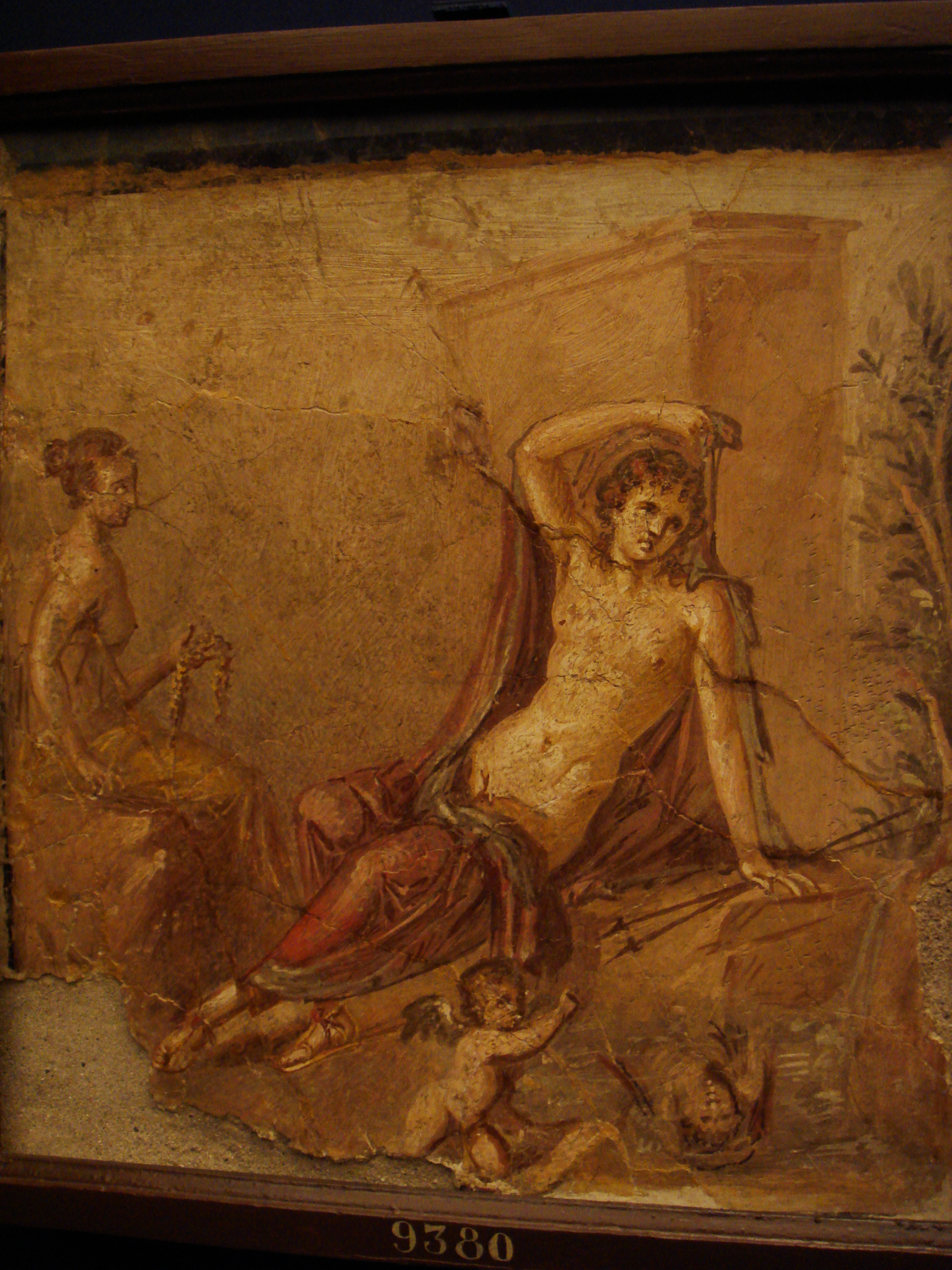
Narcissus and Echo (45–79 AD), wall painting from Pompeii

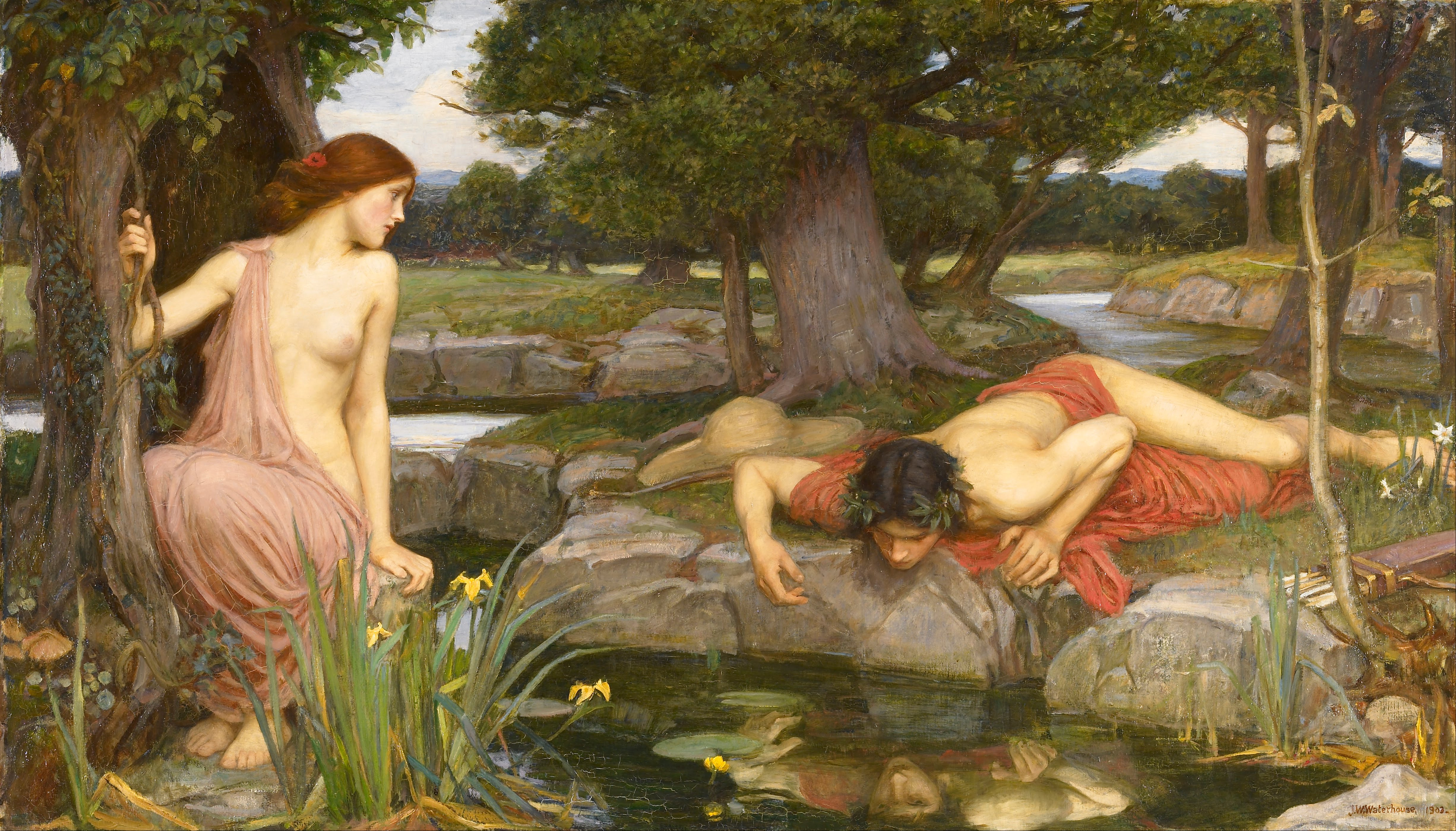
Echo and Narcissus (1903), a Pre-Raphaelite interpretation by John William Waterhouse

Echo and Narcissus is a myth from Ovid's Metamorphoses, a Roman mythological epic from the Augustan Age. The introduction of the mountain nymph, Echo, into the story of Narcissus, the beautiful youth who rejected Echo and fell in love with his own reflection, appears to have been Ovid's invention. Ovid's version influenced the presentation of the myth in later Western art and literature.

== Story ==
The myth is told in Book III of the Metamorphoses and tells the story of Echo, a mountain nymph from Mount Cithaeron, and Narcissus, a hunter from Thespiae in Boeotia, known for his many admirers and his beauty but also his callous rejections of those admirers.

Echo was a "very talkative nymph" whom the goddess Venus admires for her magnificent voice and song. She distracted the goddess Juno by talking for hours while her husband Jupiter had affairs with other nymphs. One day, discovering the trick, Juno curses Echo by making her unable to initiate a spoken sentence on her own and instead only being able to finish a sentence started by someone else. "I've been cheated enough by your prattling tongue. From now on your words will be short and sweet!" This is the explanation of the aural effect, which was named after her.

Narcissus was born to Liriope, a Naiad, and Cephissus, a river god. When he was born, Liriope asked the prophet Tiresias if he would live a long life, to which he replied “so long as he never knows himself.”

The prophet’s words would prove to be true as, sometime after being cursed, Echo spied Narcissus while he was out hunting deer with his companions. She immediately fell in love with him and, infatuated, followed quietly. The more she looked at the young man, the more she longed for him. Though she wished with all her heart to call out to Narcissus, Juno's curse prevented her.

During the hunt, Narcissus became separated from his companions and called out, ‘Is anyone there?’ and heard the nymph repeat his words. Startled, Narcissus answered the voice, ‘Come here,’ only to be told the same. When Narcissus saw that nobody had emerged from the glade, he concluded that the owner of the voice must be running away from him and called out again. Finally, he shouted, "This way, we must come together." Taking this to be a reciprocation of her love, Echo concurred ecstatically, "We must come together!"

In her delight, Echo rushed to Narcissus ready to throw her arms around her beloved. Narcissus, however, was appalled and, spurning her, exclaimed, ‘Hands off! May I die before you enjoy my body.’ All Echo could whisper in reply was, ‘enjoy my body’ and having done so she fled, scorned, humiliated, and shamed.

Despite the harshness of his rejection, Echo's love for Narcissus only grew. Echo's fellow nymphs prayed to Nemesis to punish Narcissus with a love that was equally not reciprocated. Nemesis caused him to fall in love with his own reflection in a pool of water where he wasted away and died, unable to take his eyes away from the beautiful youth he did not recognise as himself. Narcissus, looking one last time into the pool uttered, "Oh marvellous boy, I loved you in vain, farewell", Echo too chorused, "Farewell." When the time came for Narcissus's funeral, people came to where he lay, but found no body. All that was left of Narcissus was the six-petalled white flower arranged around a golden centre that was named after him.

As the other nymphs took Narcissus into the afterlife, they wailed a sorrowful song, and Echo repeated the last syllabic wails back in sadness. When the river master of death brought Narcissus on the boat across the Styx into the afterlife, Narcissus stared at his reflection, in unrequited desire.

Eventually, Echo, too, began to waste away. Though she was immortal, her body faded and her bones turned to stone until all that remained of Echo was the sound of her voice.

== Retellings ==
=== Film and Stage ===
- Amor d'un'ombra e gelosia d'un'aura, an opera composed by Domenico Scarlatti to a libretto by Carlo Sigismondo Capece (1714)
- Écho et Narcisse, an opera composed by Christoph Willibald Gluck to a libretto by Louis-Théodore de Tschudi (1779)

== Gallery ==
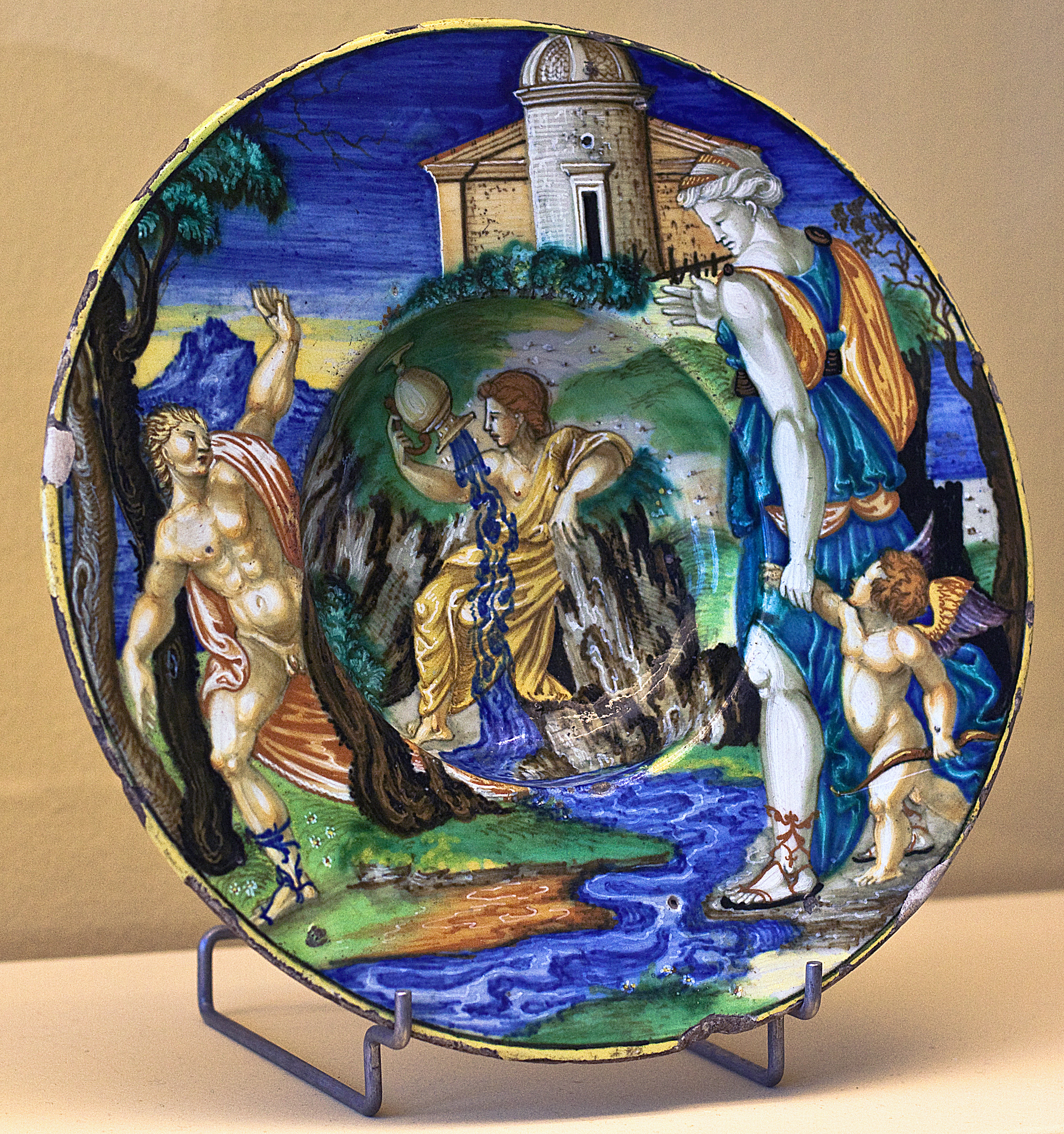
Francesco Xanto Avelli, Echo, Amor en Narcissus (1535)

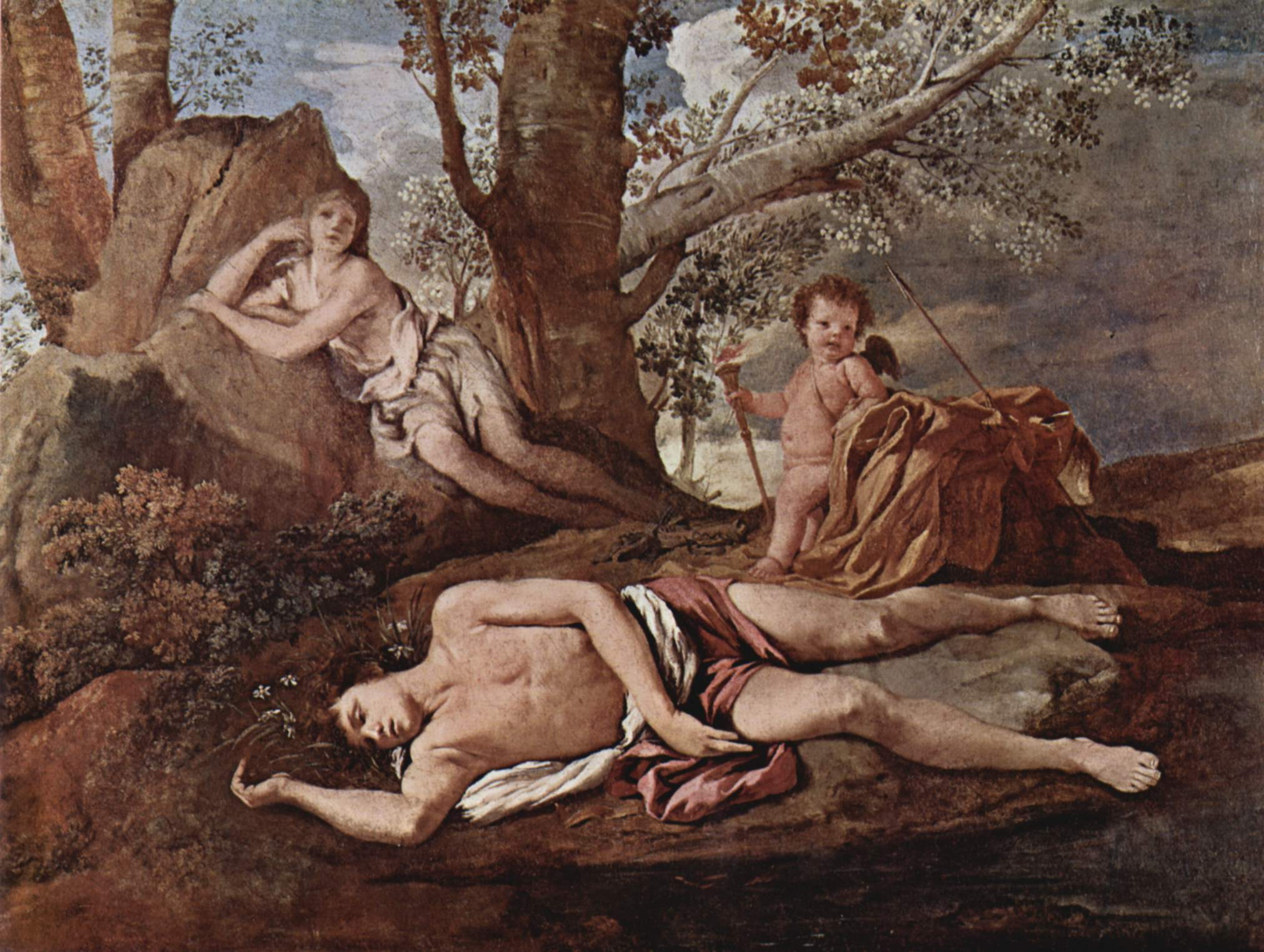
Nicolas Poussin, Écho et Narcisse (ca. 1629–1630)

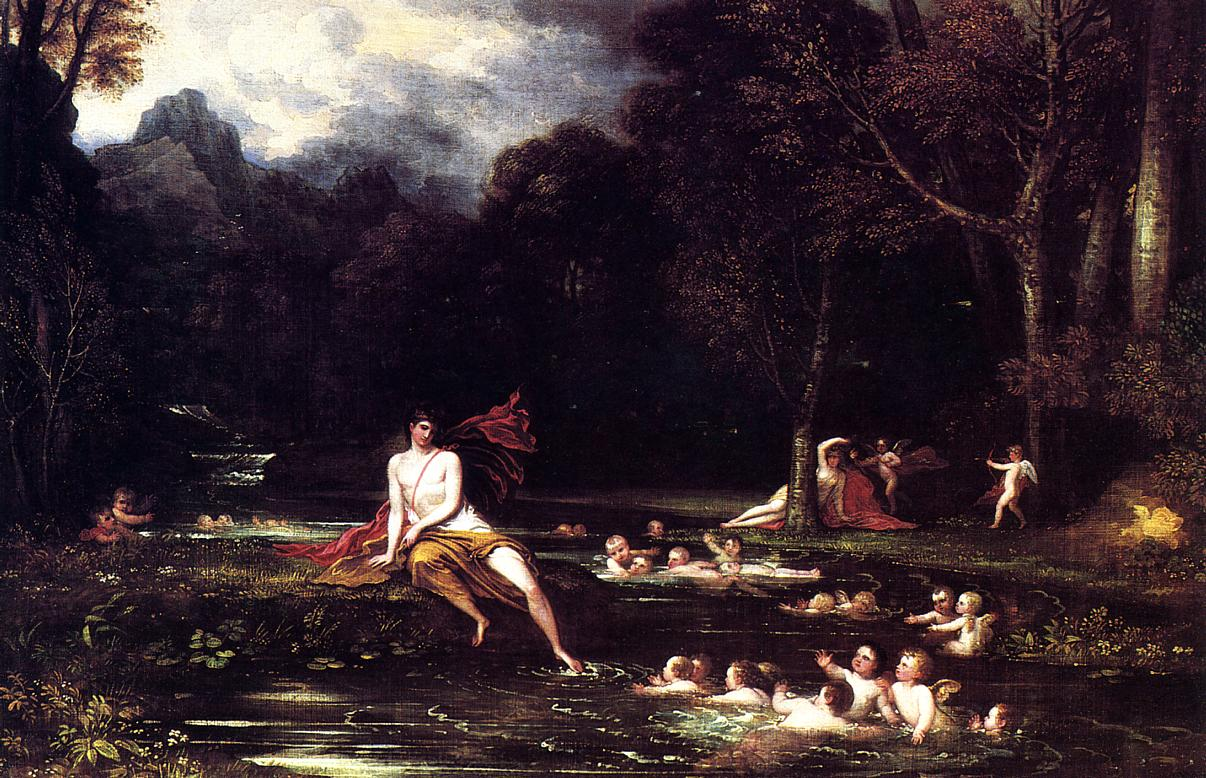
Benjamin West, Narcissus and Echo (1805)

== See also ==
- Classical mythology
