= Amor d'un'ombra e gelosia d'un'aura =

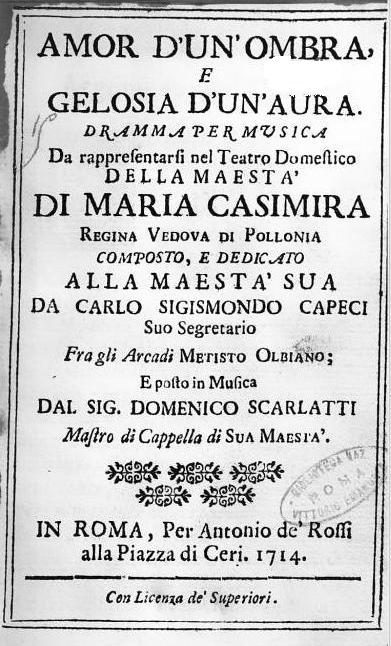
Title page of the libretto printed for the Rome premiere, 1714

Amor d'un'ombra e gelosia d'un'aura ("The Love of a Shade and the Jealousy of an Aura"), also known as Narciso ("Narcissus"), is an opera in three acts composed by Domenico Scarlatti to a libretto by Carlo Sigismondo Capece. It premiered in Rome in January 1714 at the private theatre of Maria Casimira of Poland who had commissioned the work. The libretto is based on two fables from Ovid's Metamorphoses: Echo and Narcissus (Book III) and Cephalus and Procris (Book VII).

== Background and performance history ==
Queen Maria Casimira had taken up residence in Rome in 1699 following the death of her husband Jan III Sobieski and her subsequent exile from Poland. Once in Rome she set up a court and became an active figure in the city's musical life. In 1709, Domenico Scarlatti succeeded his father Alessandro as her court composer. His librettist, Carlo Capece, was her private secretary and court poet. Amor d'un'ombra e gelosia d'un'aura premiered at Maria Casimira's private theatre in the Palazzo Zuccari in January 1714 and proved to be the last of the several operas which Scarlatti had composed for her. Five months after the premiere, she departed for France, leaving a string of debts behind her.

In addition to Scarlatti's opera, the 1714 Carnival opera season in Rome saw the premieres of Caldara's Tito e Berenice (also with a libretto by Capece) and Gasparini's Lucio Papirio (with a libretto by Antonio Salvi). These two were the result of a competition set by Cardinal Pietro Ottoboni, a prominent patron of the arts in Rome. Two rival academies, the Accademia degli Arcadi and the Accademia dei Quirini, were each to sponsor an opera to be performed in the newly renovated Teatro Capranica. Ottoboni would give a generous gift to the academy which had produced the best one. According to a French correspondent at the time, Tito e Berenice had considerably less success with the audiences than Lucio Papirio, but the best opera presented that season was actually Amor d'un'ombra e gelosia d'un'aura.

A revised version of the opera with the addition of two arias and two duets composed by Thomas Roseingrave opened at the Haymarket Theatre in London on 30 May 1720 under the title Narciso. Roseingrave also published the overture and arias of the opera, the only vocal music of Scarlatti that was printed in his lifetime. Capece's original libretto was adapted for the London performance by Paolo Antonio Rolli who eliminated the role of Nicandro. While the cast for the Rome premiere is unknown, the principal roles in the London performance were taken by Margherita Durastanti (Narciso), Anastasia Robinson (Eco), Benedetto Baldassari (Cefalo), and Ann Turner Robinson (Procri).

The Haymarket Theatre Narciso proved to be the last time one of Scarlatti's operas was performed in his lifetime. The discovery of a copy of the manuscript score in the library of Friedrich Chrysander led to several late 20th and early 21st century revivals. A version using the voices of opera singers but with the characters portrayed on stage by marionettes was produced in 2002 at the Besançon International Music Festival.
