= Randall Scotting =

American countertenor

Randall Scotting is an American countertenor performing internationally at opera houses and concert venues. As a young singer, he made his American stage debut performing the role of Nireno in Handel's Giulio Cesare at Opera Colorado. Randall's first leading role in an opera was singing Oberon in Britten's A Midsummer Night's Dream in New York as part of the Juilliard Opera Center. The next year he made his European stage debut performing the role of Teseo in Vivaldi's Ercole sul Termodonte at the Festival dei Due Mondi in Spoleto, Italy. In December 2019, Scotting made his Royal Opera House Covent Garden mainstage debut in London performing the role of Apollo in McVicar's production of Britten's Death in Venice In May 2022, Scotting made his Bayerische Staatsoper debut in Munich performing the role of Michael in a production of Haas's micro-tonal opera Thomas. On 2 September 2022, Scotting's debut solo album with the Orchestra of the Age of Enlightenment, The Crown: Heroic Arias for Senesino was released by Signum Classics.

== Early life and education ==
Randall was born in Marshall, Minnesota, and was raised in the small Colorado town of Grand Junction. His mother was an HR manager at a bank and his father owned an RV dealership. Scotting has said that coming from a non-musical family and growing up in rural Colorado provided little access to classical music and opera, but he was drawn to performing after his first dance class at 9 years old. Although his parents were not artistic themselves, they were supportive and he continued to dance, began playing cello at 12 and started voice lessons at age 16. Unlike almost every other countertenor performing today, Randall was not a boy soprano or member of a boys' choir. Rather, he sang baritone for three years as a teenager, shifting up to tenor for 6 months, before moving entirely to countertenor at the age of 20. Randall began his undergraduate studies at Colorado State University, double-majoring in voice and cello performance for three years. He then continued his vocal training at Butler University in Indianapolis for two more years where he received a Bachelor of Music in Voice. He began graduate studies in Voice at Southern Methodist University in Dallas for one year, and then trained at the Juilliard Opera Center in New York as a guest artist during 2005 and 2006. In 2008, Scotting received an Artist Diploma in Opera and Solo Vocal Performance from the University of Colorado, Boulder and shortly thereafter was awarded a Fulbright Scholarship to study Hungarian folk music's influence on contemporary song at the Liszt Ferenc Academy of Music. Upon completing his Fulbright, he remained living in Budapest for two more years. In 2012, Scotting relocated to London to begin work on a doctorate at the Royal College of Music. In the spring of 2018, he was awarded a PhD for his thesis centered on the castrato Senesino (Francesco Bernardi) and his non-Handelian roles within the context of 18th-century Italian opera. Throughout these years, he studied voice with Sheri Greenawald, Éva Marton, and Gerald Martin Moore. As a young countertenor, Scotting also trained at the Britten-Pears Young Artist Programme in Aldeburgh, Ravinia's Steans Music Institute in Chicago, and the Weill Music Institute at Carnegie Hall in New York.

== Performing career ==
Scotting is distinctive among countertenors for his warm, resonate, and strong voice as well as his physical stature. He began singing professionally while still studying at university, performing smaller operatic roles and singing in concerts with varied orchestras and ensembles. Scotting's first major leading stage role was at the Festival dei due Mondi in Spoleto, Italy, singing in Vivaldi's Ercole sul Termodonte conducted by Alan Curtis. He has sung many leading roles since, including the title roles in Handel's Giulio Cesare, Rinaldo, and Orlando as well as the roles of Ruggiero (in Alcina), Athamas (in Semele), Ottone (in Agrippina), and Hamor (in Jephtha). He has sung the title roles in Gluck's Orfeo ed Euridice, Vivaldi's il Tigrane, Cavalli's Eliogabalo, Caldara's Santo Stefano, and Stradella's San Giovanni Battista. Scotting has also performed Britten's leading countertenor roles of Oberon in A Midsummer Night's Dream and the Voice of Apollo in Death in Venice. Other roles of note include: the Refugee (in Dove's Flight), Adone (in Sciarrino's Venere e Adone), Valentiniano (in Gluck's Ezio), and the Sorceress (in Purcell's Dido & Aeneas). Companies he has worked with include the Metropolitan Opera, Royal Opera House Covent Garden, Bayerische Staatsoper, Staatsoper Hamburg, Seattle Opera, Lyric Opera of Chicago, Santa Fe Opera, Detroit Opera, Opera Colorado, Boston Baroque, New York Philharmonic, Ars Lyrica Houston, National Sawdust, Pinchgut Opera, Landestheater Neustrelitz, Budapest Kamaraopera, Minnesota Opera, the original New York City Opera, Santa Barbara Symphony, Opera Omaha, Fort Worth Opera, the Bath International Music Festival, Christchurch Arts Festival, and the Spoleto Festival.

Scotting also sings modern and contemporary music, utilizing over three octaves of his voice. He has sung staged performances of Arnold Schoenberg's Pierrot lunaire, Iannis Xenakis's challenging masterwork The Oresteia, and Peter Maxwell Davies's Eight Songs for a Mad King. In addition to singing music by living composers like Jonathan Dove, Salvatore Sciarrino Caroline Shaw, Matthew Aucoin, Olga Neuwirth, Christopher Cerrone, Philip Glass, Péter Eötvös, Scotting continues to perform the music of György Ligeti, John Cage, Harrison Birtwistle, and Luciano Berio. Scotting has musically improvised with Bobby McFerrin at Carnegie Hall, crooned Leonard Cohen songs while dancing a burlesque striptease for Company XIV, and sung arias in an experimental version of Handel's Ariodante at National Sawdust accompanied by a bluegrass band. His recital repertoire includes programs not traditionally associated with the countertenor voice, including Schumann's Dichterliebe, Ligeti's Öt Arany‐dal, and Berio's Canzoni popolari.

== Recordings ==
=== Audio ===
- Infinite Refrain: Music of Love's Refuge an album of 17th century Venetian gay love duets and arias with Jorge Navarro Colorado and Academy of Ancient Music, conducted by Laurence Cummings, including music by Monteverdi, Cavalli, Melani, Castrovillari, Legrenzi, Frescobaldi, Merula, Boretti, and Stradella. Released 3 November 2023, London, UK. Label: Signum Classics
- Lovesick an album of 17th century lute and folk song with lutenist Stephen Stubbs including music by Dowland, Purcell, Lawes, Blow, Moulinié, Guédron, Cesti, Castrovillari, and traditional folk music from England, Scotland, and Ireland. Released on 10 February 2023, London, UK. Label: Signum Classics
- The Crown: Heroic Arias for Senesino (debut solo album) with Orchestra of the Age of Enlightenment, conducted by Laurence Cummings, including music by Giaj, Ariosti, Orlandini, Ristori, Bononcini, Giacomelli, and Lotti. Released on 2 September 2022, London, UK. Label: Signum Classics
- Oratorio di Santo Stefano Primo Re dell'Ungheria by Antonio Caldara with the Savaria Baroque Orchestra, title role: Santo Stefano, July 2014, Budapest, Hungary. Label: Hungaroton
- The Metamorphoses by Paul Crabtree with the Cantori New York Chorus, October 2009, New York, USA. Label: Arsis Audio

=== Video ===
- Ercole su'l Termodonte by Antonio Vivaldi with il Complesso Barocco (DVD) – Role: Teseo – June 2007 – Spoleto, Italy – Label: Dynamic

== Television ==
- Mozart's London Odyssey with Lucy Worsley on the BBC – London, UK – June 2016

== Academic work ==
Scotting received his PhD from London's Royal College of Music in 2018, supervised by Michael Burden, at New College, University of Oxford. The panel of examiners included Handelian and 18th-century opera scholars Wendy Heller and Donald Burrows. Scotting's doctoral thesis is titled, Unknown Senesino: Francesco Bernardi's vocal profile and dramatic portrayal, 1700–1740.

Scotting was granted a Fulbright Scholarship in 2008 to live in Budapest while researching and performing Hungarian folk music and contemporary song by Ligeti, Bartók, Kurtág, Farkas, and Eötvös. His research was published by the Hungarian Fulbright Commission.

== Personal life ==
Scotting and his husband, Nic Mramer, met in Indiana while attending Butler University and have been partners since 2001. They were married in 2013 at New York City Hall and now reside in Boston, MA. Scotting has two biological children with a lesbian couple to whom he remains close friends. He is active in fitness and weight-training and remains one of the only bodybuilding countertenors singing today.
