= Gl'illinesi =

Gl'illinesi (Italian: [ʎilliˈneːzi] or Gli illinesi (Italian: [ʎi illiˈneːzi], lit. 'The Illinese') may refer to:

- Gl'illinesi, an 1818 opera by Francesco Basili
- Gl'illinesi, an 1836 opera by Pietro Antonio Coppola
