= Battistelli =

Battistelli is an Italian surname derived from the given name Battista. Notable people with the surname include:

- Benoît Battistelli (born 1950), French diplomat
- Francesca Battistelli (born 1985), American Christian pop singer
- Giorgio Battistelli (born 1953), Italian composer
- Mariam Battistelli, Italian operatic soprano and actress
- Pier Francesco Battistelli, 17th century Italian painter
- Stefano Battistelli (born 1970), Italian swimmer
