= Ercole su'l Termodonte =

Opera by Antonio Vivaldi

- Dramma per musica by Antonio Vivaldi
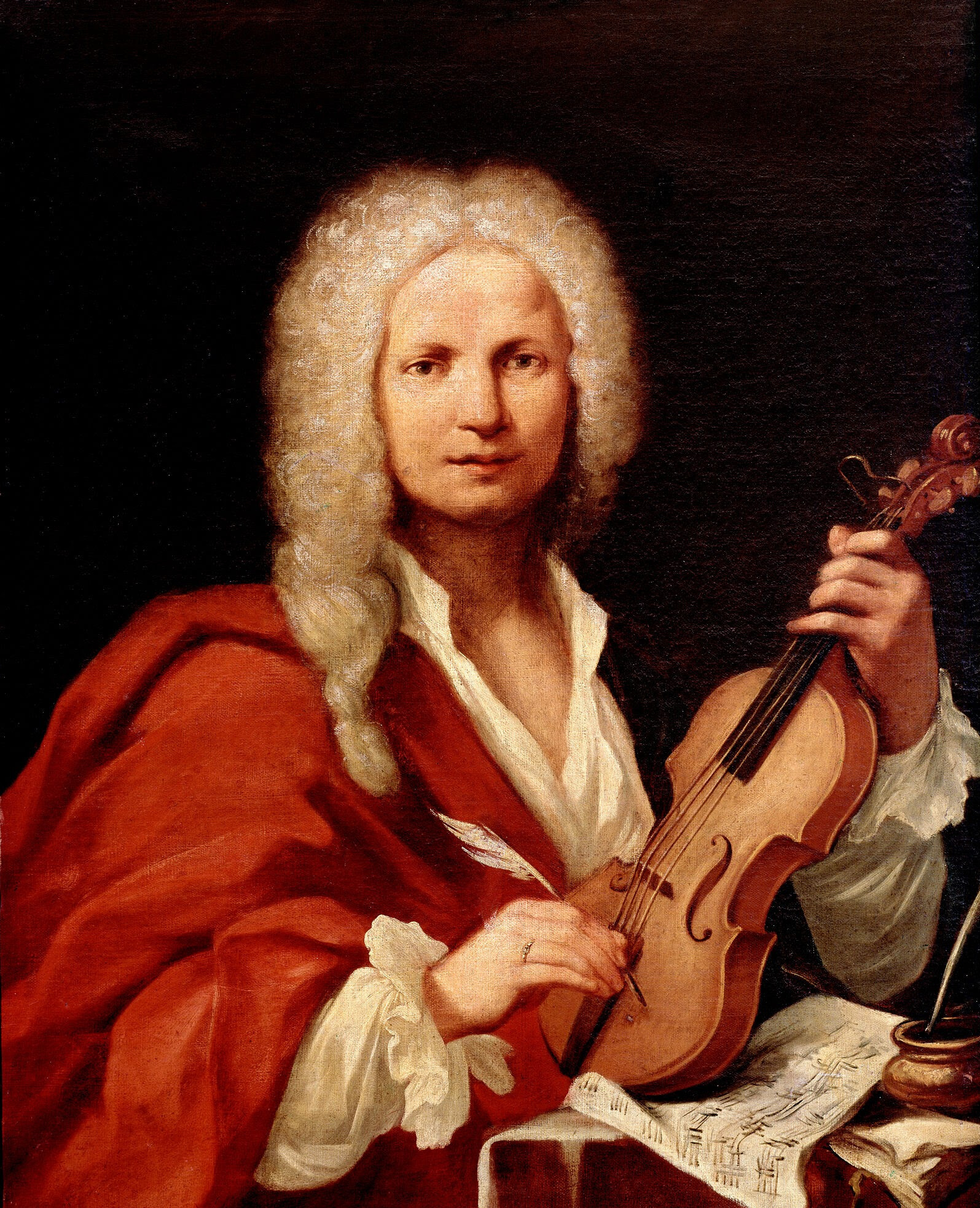
- Putative portrait of Antonio Vivaldi, c. 1723
- Librettist: Antonio Salvi
- Language: Italian
- Premiere: 23 January 1723; Teatro Capranica, Rome

Ercole su'l Termodonte (Italian pronunciation: [ˈɛrkole sul termoˈdonte]; Hercules in Thermodon) is a baroque Italian opera in three acts. In 1723, it became the sixteenth opera set to music by Antonio Vivaldi. Its catalogue number is RV 710. The libretto was written by Antonio Salvi (not Giacomo Francesco Bussani as previously misattributed). The opera was premiered on 23 January 1723 in Rome's Teatro Capranica. Due to a papal edict preventing women from appearing onstage in Rome, it premiered with castrati singing all the female roles. Vivaldi was both conductor and violin soloist.

Although the score was believed to have been lost, 30 arias and 2 duets were discovered in several archives, and the rest of the opera was reconstructed by Alessandro Ciccolini.

== Roles ==
Role	Voice type	Premiere cast, 1723 (Conductor: Antonio Vivaldi )
Hercules (Ercole)	tenor	Giovanni Battista Pinacci
Antiope, Queen of the Amazons	mezzo-soprano castrato (en travesti)	Giovanni Ossi
Martesia,Antiope's daughter	soprano castrato (en travesti)	Girolamo Bartoluzzi
Ippolita, Antiope's sister	soprano castrato (en travesti)	Giacinto Fontana, "Farfallino"
Orizia, Antiope's second sister	soprano castrato (en travesti)	Giovanni "Tedeschino" Dreyer
Theseus, prince of Athens	contralto castrato	Giovanni Battista Minelli
Alceste, king of Sparta	soprano castrato	Giovanni Carestini
Telamone, king of Ithaca	contralto castrato	Giuseppe Domenico Galletti

== Synopsis ==
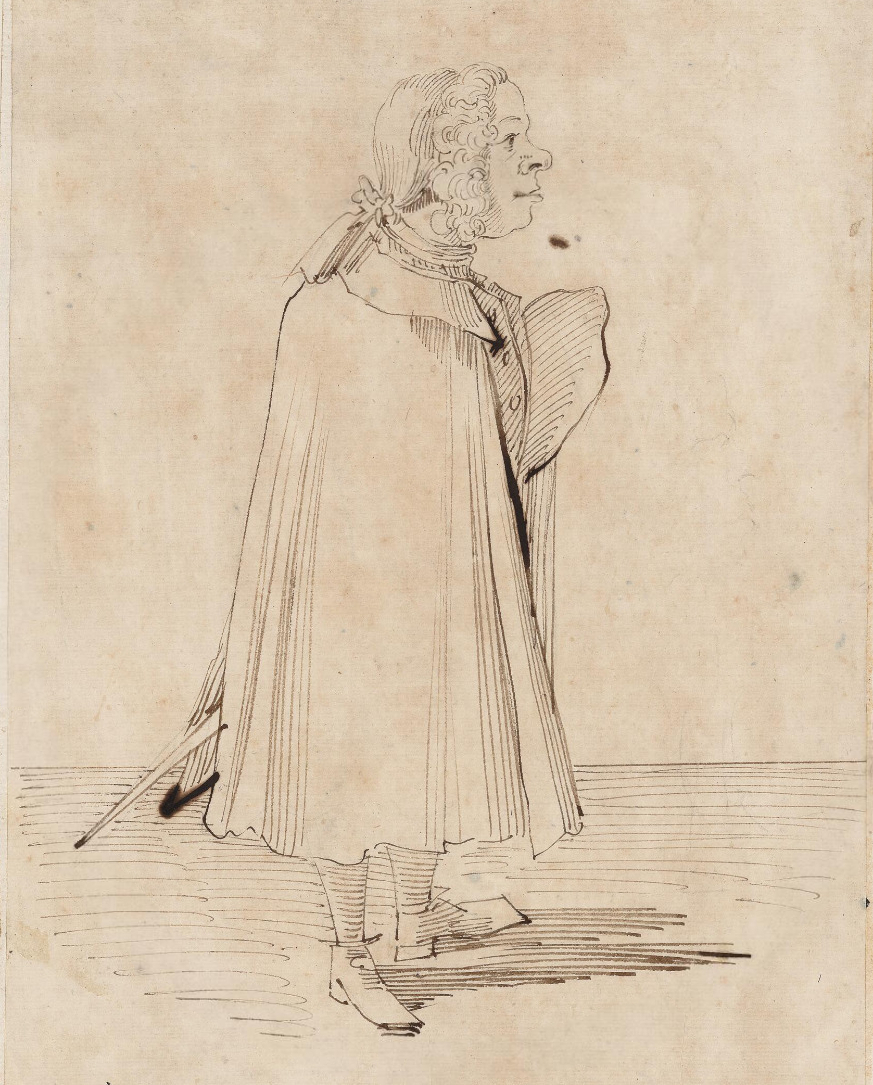
Caricature of Giacinto Fontana as Ippolita by Pier Leone Ghezzi, 1723

The story is based on the ninth of twelve legendary Labors of Hercules. To atone for killing his children in wrath, Hercules must perform twelve labors, the ninth of which is to travel to Thermodon and capture the sword of the Amazon Queen Antiope. (In other versions of the story, the quest was for her magical girdle.) The Amazons were a tribe of female warriors who put all their male children to death.

Hercules, accompanied by the heroes Theseus, Telamon and Alceste, attacks the Amazons and captures Martesia, daughter of the queen. The Amazons then capture Theseus and, as soon as Queen Antiope swears to sacrifice him, Hippolyte falls in love with him. In the end, the goddess Diana decrees the marriage of Hippolyte with Theseus, prince of Athens, and of Martesia with Alceste, king of Sparta.

== Recordings ==
- DVD: (Spoleto Festival 2006 - 2007) Vivaldi - Ercole su'l Termodonte / Il Complesso Barocco, conductor: Alan Curtis. Performers: Zachary Stains, Mary-Ellen Nesi, Laura Cherici, Luca Dordolo, Marina Bartoli, Randall Scotting, Filippo Mineccia / Il Complesso Barocco, conductor: Alan Curtis, director: John Pascoe. Dynamic, Italy.
- CD: (2010) Vivaldi - Ercole su'l Termodonte / conductor: Fabio Biondi. With Vivica Genaux, Diana Damrau, Patrizia Ciofi, Joyce DiDonato, Romina Basso, Philippe Jaroussky, Rolando Villazón, Topi Lehtipuu. Virgin Classics. Recorded January 2009 in Florence, Italy.
