= Giacinto Fontana =

Italian opera singer

Domenico Giacinto Fontana
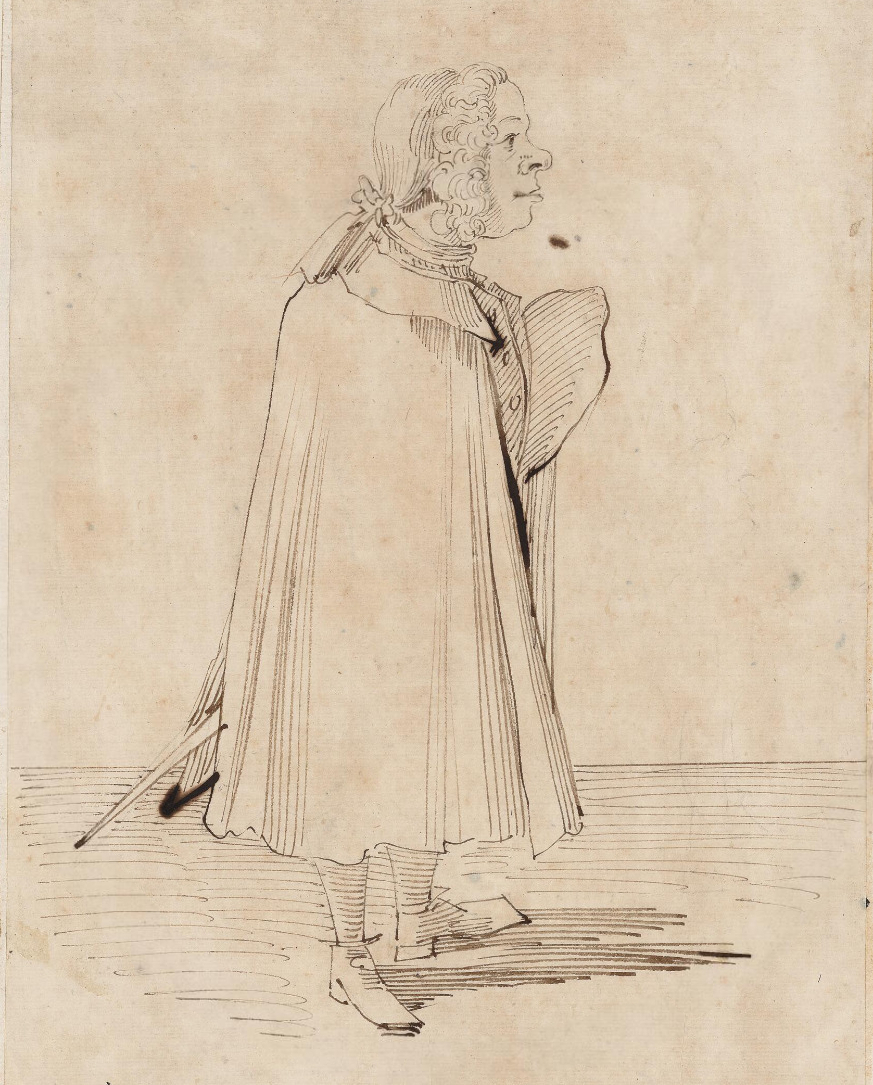
- Caricature of Fontana by Pier Leone Ghezzi, 1623
- Born: 1692; Perugia, Italy
- Died: 1739 (aged 47); Perugia, Italy
- Other names: Farfallino ("Little Butterfly")
- Occupation: Castrato singer
- Years active: 1712–1736
- Known for: Soprano female roles

Domenico Giacinto Fontana (1692–1739), also known as "Farfallino", was an Italian castrato singer active primarily in Rome from 1712 to 1736. He specialised in singing soprano female roles and earned the name "Farfallino" ("Little Butterfly") for his graceful stage appearance. He was born in Perugia and died there at the age of 47. At times he feared ridicule by performing certain roles, such as a pregnant primadonna.

== Roles created ==
Fontana is known to have created the following roles:

- Olimpia in Giovanni Bononcini's Crispo (1721)
- Griselda in Alessandro Scarlatti's Griselda (1721)
- Hippolyte in Vivaldi's Ercole su'l Termodonte (1723)
- Marzia in Leonardo Vinci's Catone in Utica (1728)
- Semiramide in Leonardo Vinci's La Semiramide riconosciuta (1729)
- Mandane in Leonardo Vinci's Artaserse (1730)
- Cleofide in Leonardo Vinci's Alessandro nell'Indie (1730)
