= Tolomeo e Alessandro =

1711 opera by Domenico Scarlatti

Tolomeo e Alessandro, ovvero la corona disprezzata is an Italian-language opera by Domenico Scarlatti to a libretto by Carlo Sigismondo Capece which premiered in Rome on 19 January 1711 at the Palazzo Zuccari, with scenery by Filippo Juvarra. It was second of the seven operas composed by Domenico for the Polish queen Maria Casimira Sobieski, following his pastorale in three acts La Silvia of 27 January 1710.

== Recordings ==
- 2010: Ann Hallenberg (Tolomeo), Raffaella Milanesi (Alessandro), Klara Ek (Seleuce), Roberta Invernizzi (Elisa), Mary-Ellen Nesi (Dorisbe) Theodora Baka (Araspe). Il Complesso Barocco, Alan Curtis, 3 CDs, Fundación Caja Madrid, digital download only DG Archiv Produktion 47640349
