= Teatro Capranica =

Theatre in Rome, Italy

Coordinates: 41.9002°N 12.4778°E

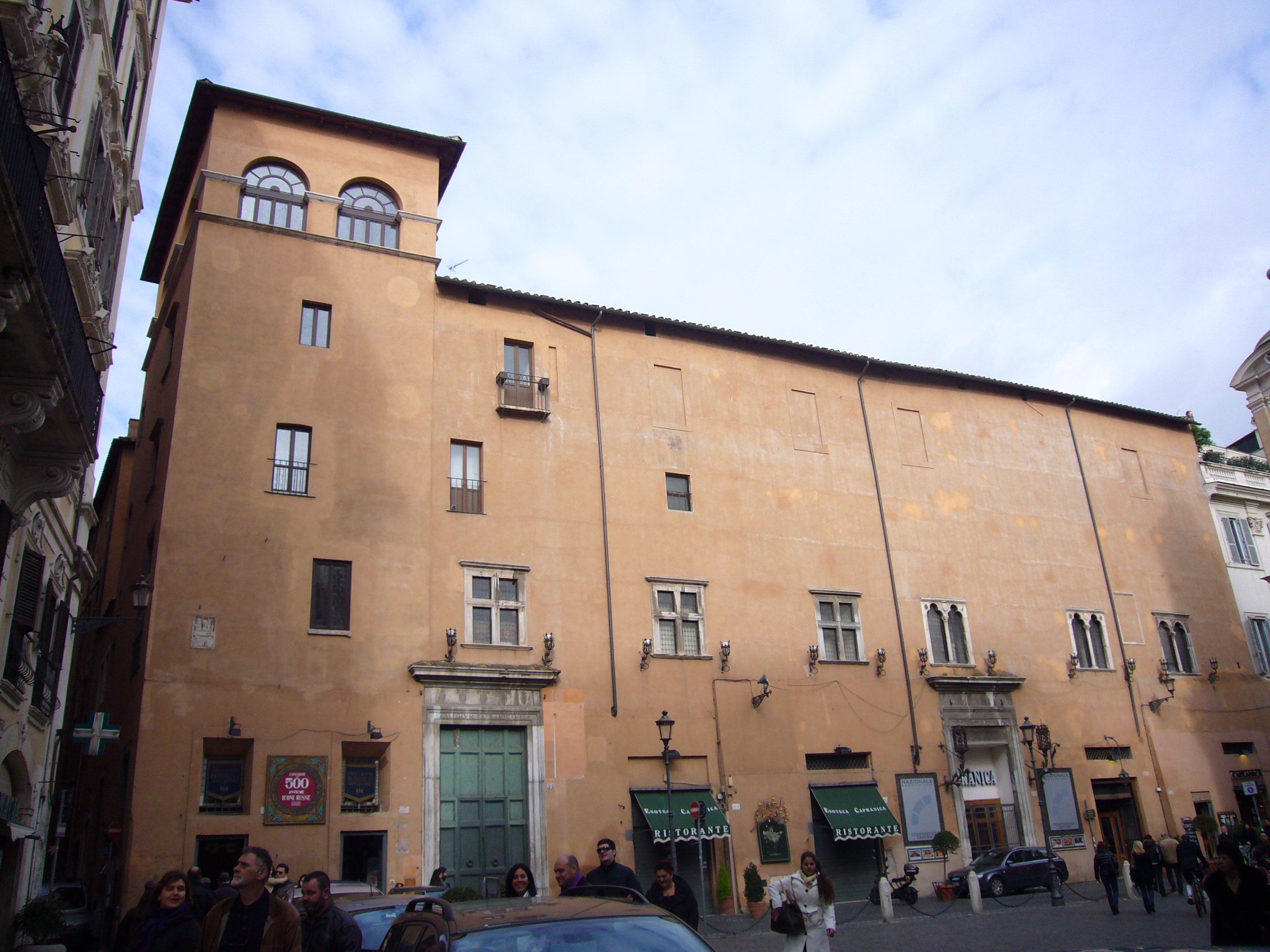
Facade of the Palazzo Capranica in 2009. The entrance to the theatre is the first large door on the right.

The Teatro Capranica is a theatre situated at 101 Piazza Capranica in the Colonna district of Rome. Originally constructed in 1679 by the Capranica family and housed in the early Renaissance Palazzo Capranica, it was the second public theatre to open in Rome. It was the site of many premieres of Baroque operas including Caldara's Tito e Berenice, Scarlatti's Griselda, and Vivaldi's Ercole su'l Termodonte. The Capranica ceased operating as a full-scale theatre and opera house in 1881 and in 1922 was converted into a cinema. Following the closure of the cinema in 2000, it has functioned on a hire basis as a conference and performance venue.

== History ==
The palazzo in which the theatre was situated had been originally constructed in 1451 by Cardinal Domenico Capranica, to serve as both his own residence and the future home of the Almo Collegio Capranica, a college for young clerics which he founded in 1457. One of the few remaining examples of Roman residential architecture of the early renaissance, it has a large side tower and a piano nobile lit by three cross mullion windows as well as three windows in the late Gothic style which suggest that the palace may have incorporated an earlier building on the site. In the late 1670s, another member of the family, Pompeo Capranica, had a private theatre carved out from existing family apartments without changing the exterior of the building. The theatre was inaugurated on 6 January 1679 with Arcangelo Corelli leading the orchestra for the premiere of Bernardo Pasquini's opera Dov'è amore è pietà.

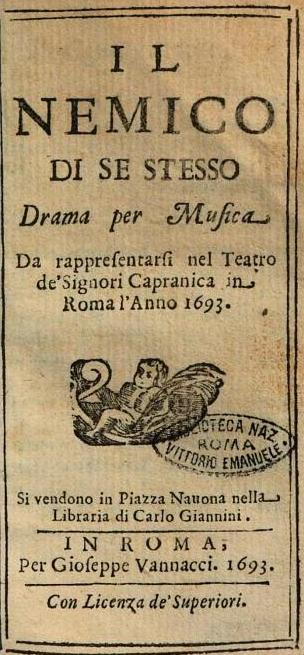
Libretto for Scarlatti's Il nemico di se stesso, one of his many works to premiere at the Teatro Capranica

With the accession of Pope Alexander VIII, Pompeo Capranica and his brother Federico received permission to enlarge the theatre and open it to the public. They entrusted the task to Carlo Buratti (a student of Carlo Fontana) who completely rebuilt the theatre in 1694 transforming it into the standard U-shape with rich ornamentation and 6 tiers of 26 boxes each. It re-opened as a public theatre (Rome's second) on 18 January 1695 with a performance of Clearco in Negroponte a three-act opera jointly composed by Giovanni Lorenzo Lulier, Tommaso Gaffi and Carlo Francesco Cesarini. However, the new theatre still lacked a public entrance opening onto the street. Audiences could only enter through the workshop of a carpenter on the ground floor of the palazzo. His lease required him to close his workshop during the opera season and to provide at his own expense a wooden staircase to enable the spectators to climb into the theatre. It was a situation that was not rectified until the 19th century.

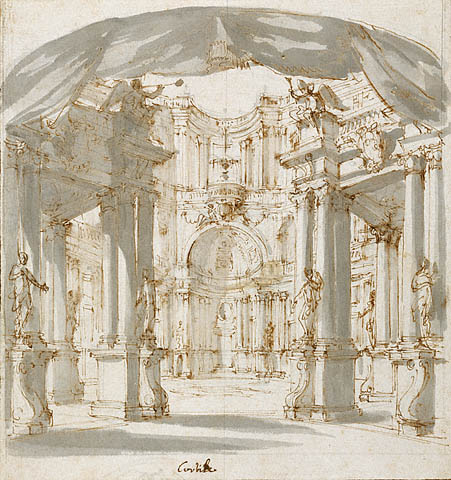
One of Filippo Juvarra's preliminary set designs for Tito e Berenice which premiered at the Capranica in 1714

Under Pope Innocent XII, public theatrical performances were once again forbidden and the theatre remained closed from 1699 to 1711. When the prohibition on public performances was lifted, the Capranica brothers re-opened the theatre and soon attracted the patronage of Cardinal Pietro Ottoboni who contributed to the cost the renovation after its long closure and hired his architect, Filippo Juvarra, to renovate the stage. The two decades after the re-opening marked the heyday of the theatre which would become Rome's primary public opera house and see the premieres of many new operas and innovative sets designed by Filippo Juvarra and Francesco Galli Bibiena. The composer Alessandro Scarlatti was closely associated with the Capranica which premiered several of his early operas beginning in 1679. When he returned to Rome in 1718 after his years in Naples, he produced his three finest operas for the theatre, Telemaco, Marco Attilio Regolo and Griselda. Between 1718 and 1721, the Capranica also saw the premieres of Scarlatti's oratorio, La gloriosa gara tra la Santità e la Sapienza, and several of his cantatas.

With the construction of new public theatres in Rome such as the Teatro Alibert (1718), Teatro Valle (1727) and Teatro Argentina (1732), the Capranica gradually declined in importance, although in the 1750s it was much favoured by Goldoni for their stagings of his plays. In 1760, he wrote his comedy Pamela maritata expressly for the theatre. The theatre went through several more renovations, closures, and proprietors starting in the second half of the 18th century. By the 19th century, it had ceased being a leading opera house in the city and tended to concentrate on comic operas and plays (often in Roman dialect), acrobatic displays, and puppet shows. The theatre returned to the Capranica family in 1853 when Marchese Bartolomeo Capranica bought it back from Prince Alessandro Torlonia and spent a great deal of money renovating it. As part of these renovation efforts, the theatre housed dozens, if not hundreds of opera companies and singers, among them Luigi Fioravanti and Oreste Sindici, the latter better known today as the composer of the National Anthem of Colombia. But despite these efforts, the Capranica never regained its former prestige. The American writer Henry P. Leland described it in 1863 as:

the resort for the Roman minenti decked in all their bravery. Here came the shoemaker, the tailor, and the small artisan, all with their wives or women, and with them the wealthy peasant who had ten cents to pay for entrance. Here the audience wept and laughed, applauded the actors, and talked to each other from one side of the house to the other.

Eventually, the costs of upkeep and dwindling audiences led to the Capranica's demise. It closed permanently following a performance of Verdi's opera Ernani on 1 March 1881. At first it was rented out as a furniture warehouse, but then stood completely empty from 1895 until 1922 when it was converted into a cinema.

== Today's theatre ==
After the closure of the Cinema Capranica in 2000, the 800-seat theatre with its now minimal stage was re-opened as a conference and performance venue available on a hire basis. Under the proprietorship of the Hotel Nazionale and managed by Montecitorio Eventi S.r.l., it has hosted four small-scale opera productions by the association "Aulico – Opera & Musica" and over the years has been the setting for numerous meetings of Italian political parties. In January 2013, Silvio Berlusconi gave a two-hour speech there in which he introduced the Popolo della Libertà candidates for the 2013 Italian general election. During a meeting of the Partito Democratico at the Capranica that lasted late into the night of 19 April 2013, Pier Luigi Bersani resigned as party leader following his failure to form a coalition government.

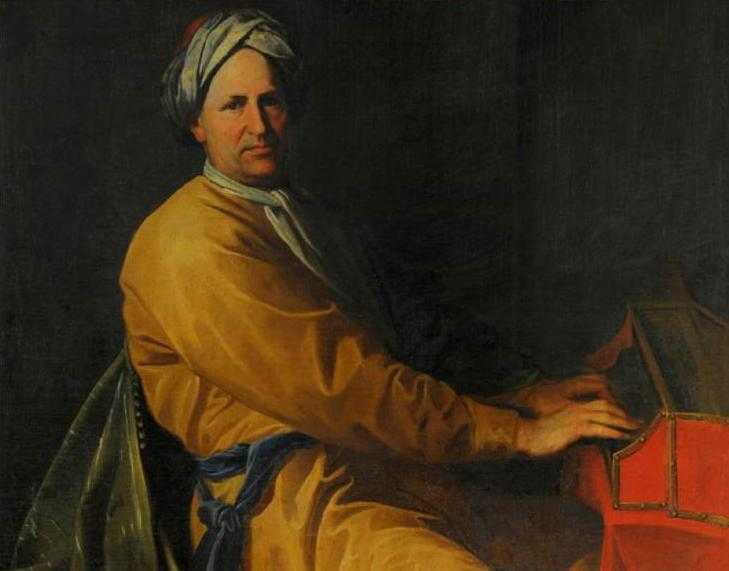
Portrait of Bernardo Pasquini by Andrea Pozzo. Pasquini's opera Dov'è amore è pietà inaugurated the newly built Teatro Capranica on 6 January 1679.

== Opera premieres ==
More than 50 works (including operas, oratorios, cantatas, and plays) have premiered at the Teatro Capranica. The first opera to be premiered there was Pasquini's Dov'è amore è pietà which inaugurated the theatre in 1679. The 1728 premiere of Riccardo Broschi's L'isola di Alcina was marked by the presence of his brother, the celebrated castrato singer Farinelli, in the role of Ruggiero. Like most of the operas premiered at the Capranica prior to 1750, it was an opera seria. The premieres at the theatre after 1750 were almost exclusively of the opera buffa genre, such as Galuppi's La cantarina (1756) or Piccinni's La donna di spirito (1770). Many of the shorter ones, such as Antonio Sacchini's La vendemmia (1760), were specifically written to be performed as comic intermezzos for prose plays. Other operas premiered at the Capranica include:

- Caldara's Tito e Berenice (1714)
- Scarlatti's Griselda (1721)
- Vivaldi's Ercole su'l Termodonte (1723) and Giustino (1724)
- Albinoni's La Statira (1726)
