= Telemaco (Scarlatti) =

Opera by Alessandro Scarlatti

- Opera by Alessandro Scarlatti
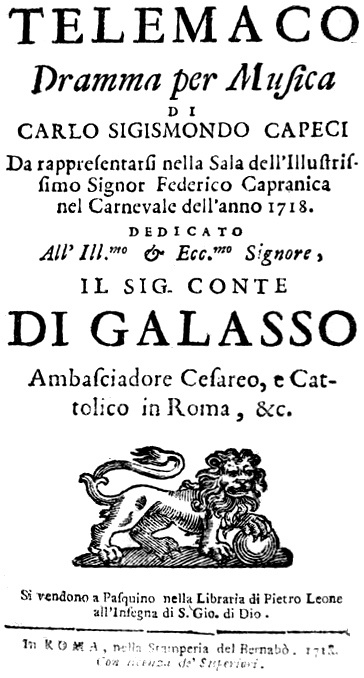
- Title page of the libretto
- Librettist: Carlo Sigismondo Capece
- Language: Italian
- Premiere: 1718; Teatro Capranica, Rome

Telemaco, ossia L'isola di Circe is a 1718 opera by Alessandro Scarlatti to a libretto by Carlo Sigismondo Capece (sometimes spelled "Capeci"), court poet to Queen Maria Casimira of Poland, living in exile in Rome, for the Teatro Capranica in Rome, where it was premiered during the carnival season. The opera was revived in 2005 by the Schwetzingen Festival and the Deutsche Oper am Rhein.

== History ==
The libretto was written by Carlo Sigismondo Capece, based on Homer's Odyssey and François Fénelon's didactic novel Les Aventures de Télémaque. The librettist was regarded as one of the central authors in Rome at the turn to the 18th century. Telemaco is his last work for the stage. The plot is full of intrigues and complications around Telemachus, the son of Odysseus. Scarlatti composed it, as one of his last operas, for the 1718 carnival season. The composer wrote 114 operas. Telemaco is known for a richness in melodies, contrasting characters, and a colourful orchestral treatment which includes dense textures and counterpoint. Scarlatti uses instruments on stage which support the action and play with the orchestra in the pit, sometimes in antiphony. The entrance of Neptune is accompanied by horns, oboes, and bassoon on stage, while Minerva enters in a chariot which holds a string orchestra with trumpets.

Telemaco was premiered at the Teatro Capranica in Rome. In the leading role was Domenico Gizzi (1687-1758), a famous singer from Naples.

Thomas Hengelbrock rediscovered the score at the Austrian National Library in Vienna and prepared it for a performance. He conducted the revival at the opening of the Schwetzingen Festival with the Balthasar-Neumann-Ensemble staged by Lukas Hemleb. The performance was called "Rediscovery of the Year" (Wiederentdeckung des Jahres 2005). In the performances in Düsseldorf, Andreas Stoehr conducted the Düsseldorfer Symphoniker and some specialists for Baroque instruments.

== Recordings ==
- Sinfonia and two arias on Arias for Domenico Gizzi – A star castrato in Baroque Rome Scarlatti "Crude Parche", "Telemaco: Sinfonia", "O a morire o a goder" Roberta Invernizzi, I Turchini, Antonio Florio
- Three arias on Alessandro Scarlatti: Opera Arias "Già nel seno", "Ho il cor tutto foco", "Vendetta, vendetta" Daniela Barcellona, Concerto de Cavalieri, Marcello Di Lisa

== Literature ==
- Thomas Hochradner: Alessandro Scarlatti. Telemaco (1717/18). In: Günter Brosche (ed.): Musikerhandschriften von Heinrich Schütz bis Wolfgang Rihm. Reclam, Stuttgart 2002, ISBN 3-15-010501-3, pp. 22–23 (with an image from the score).
