= Tito e Berenice =

Opera in three acts composed by Antonio Caldara

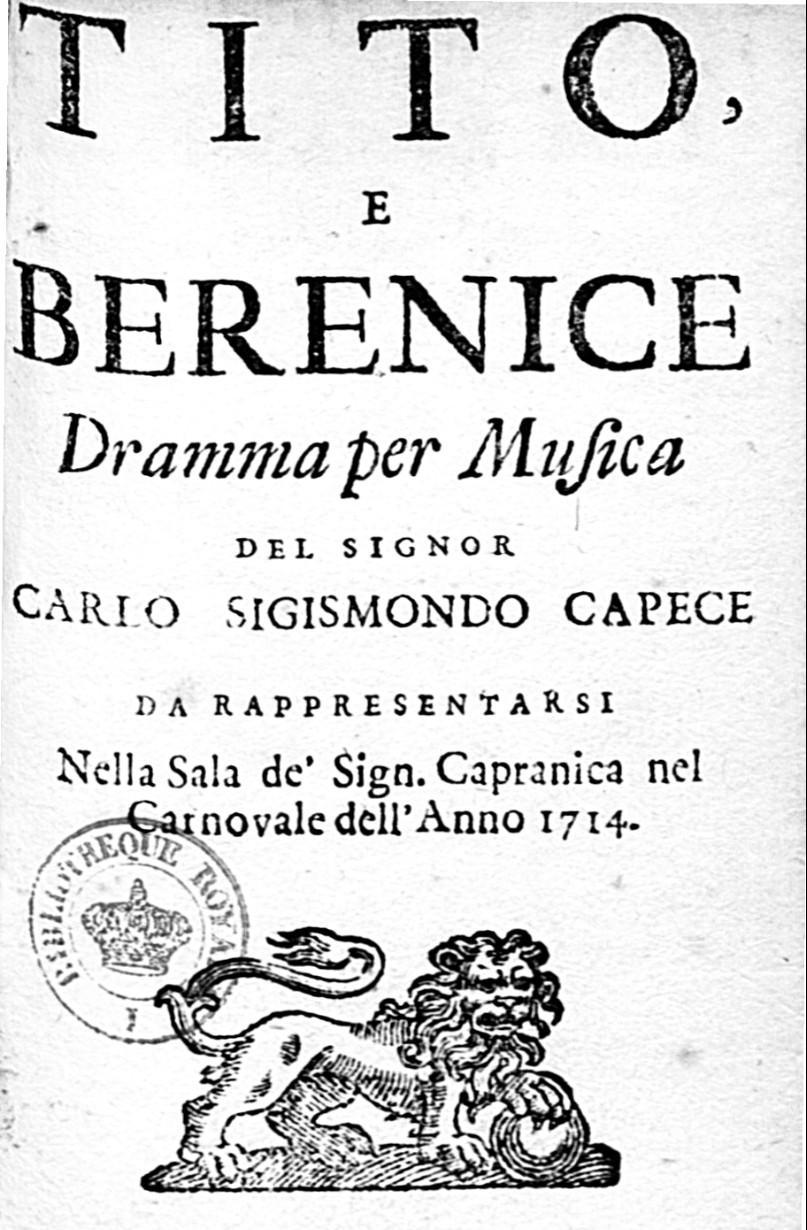
Title page of the libretto published in 1714

Tito e Berenice is an opera (dramma per musica) in three acts composed by Antonio Caldara to a libretto by Carlo Sigismondo Capece. It premiered on 10 January 1714 at the Teatro Capranica in Rome. The story centers on the love affair between Berenice of Cilicia and the future Roman Emperor Titus. The libretto borrows from earlier plays on the same subject by Corneille (Tite et Bérénice) and Racine (Bérénice), both of which premiered in 1670 and took as their starting point Suetonius's brief account of the love affair in De vita Caesarum.

== Background and performance history ==
Tito e Berenice was the result of a competition set by Cardinal Pietro Ottoboni, a prominent patron of the arts in Rome. Two rival academies, the Accademia degli Arcadi and the Accademia dei Quirini, were each to sponsor an opera to be performed during the 1714 Carnival season in the newly renovated Teatro Capranica. Ottoboni would give a generous gift to the academy which had produced the best one. Both operas were to be on themes associated with ancient Rome. Ottoboni assembled a cast of singers who would perform in both operas. Both operas had sets designed by Ottoboni's architect, Filippo Juvarra, and both were to be performed with ballet intermezzi choreographed by Nicolò L'Evêque. The Arcadi chose academy member, Carlo Sigismondo Capece, to write their libretto. He also served as the private secretary and court poet to Maria Casimira of Poland and had previously written libretti for operas performed in her private theatre at the Palazzo Zuccari in Rome (as had Ottoboni). Antonio Caldara, the maestro di cappella to Prince Ruspoli, was chosen as the composer. The Quirini chose Antonio Salvi to write the libretto for their opera, Lucio Papirio (based on the life of Lucius Papirius), and Francesco Gasparini to compose the music.

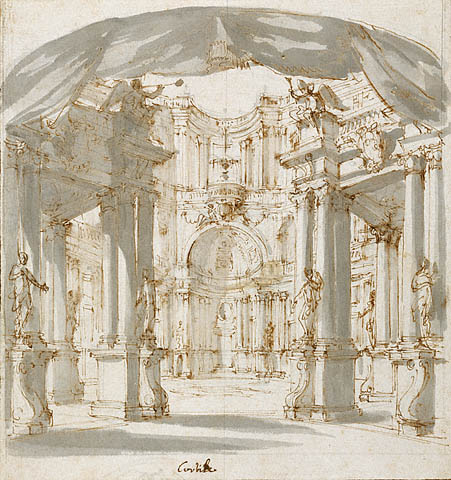
Palace courtyard, one of Filippo Juvarra's preliminary set designs for Tito e Berenice

According to a French correspondent at the time, Ottoboni "interfered" considerably in the writing process of the libretto for Tito and Berenice, making numerous modifications. Although only Capece's name appears on the printed libretto published by Bernabò for the 1714 premiere, some sources credit Ottoboni as a co-author. The libretto borrowed and mixed plot elements from two earlier French plays, Corneille's Tite et Bérénice and Racine's Bérénice, both of which were inspired by Suetonius's brief account in De vita Caesarum of the love affair between the Jewish queen Berenice of Cilicia and the future Roman Emperor Titus. All the principal characters were real historical figures, but considerable liberties were taken with the historical facts, most notably the entirely fictitious marriage of Berenice to Antiochus, King of Commagene at the end of the opera. The opera premiered on 10 January 1714 at the Teatro Capranica with three ballet intermezzi: Mori e schiavi, Giardinieri, and Popolo festante. The elaborate scenography by Juvarra involved 10 changes of sets and a stage machine. The roles of the lovers Berenice and Tito (Titus) were sung by two virtuoso castrati, Benedetto Baldassari and Domenico Tempesti.

The French correspondent wrote that the opera had considerably less success with the audiences than Lucio Papirio which premiered two weeks later but that the best opera presented that season was actually Domenico Scarlatti's Amor d'un'ombra e gelosia d'un'aura (also with a libretto by Capece) which premiered at the private theatre of Maria Casimira of Poland. There were no further performances of Tito e Berenice after the Carnival season ended in February. However, according to musicologist Reinhard Strohm, Handel may have borrowed elements from Capece's libretto (and Juvarra's stage designs) for Titus l'Empereur, an unfinished opera project which he worked on from 1731 to 1732. Although neither Tito e Berenice nor Lucio Papirio achieved lasting success, musicologist and theatre historian Mercedes Vitale Ferrero has noted that they marked three important innovations in the development of opera in Rome. The first of these was the nature of the libretti. While based on subjects from ancient Rome, they took as their models the classical French heroic plays of Corneille and Racine, and did not imitate Venetian opera of the day which obligatorily included comic characters no matter how serious or tragic the story. The second was the close collaboration and interplay between the librettist, composer, and set designer in developing each opera. The third was Juvarra's approach to the set designs. Rather than focusing on spectacular special effects and stage machinery for their own sake, his sets were specifically designed to reflect and enhance the action taking place within them.

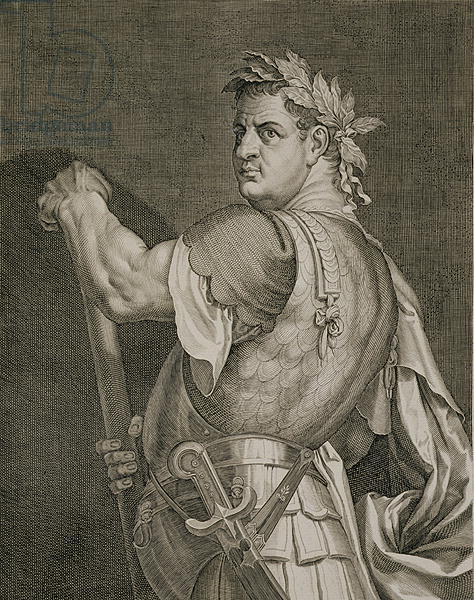
Engraved portrait of Titus by Sadeler after a painting by Titian

== Roles ==
Roles, voice types, premiere cast
Role	Voice type	Premiere cast, 10 January 1714
Vespasiano (Vespasian), Emperor of Rome	tenor	Francesco Gucciardi
Tito (Titus), Vespasian's elder son	contralto castrato	Domenico Tempesti
Domiziano (Domitian), Tito's younger brother	soprano castrato	Matteo Berselli
Berenice, (Berenice), Queen of Idumea and the lover of Tito	soprano castrato travesti	Benedetto Baldassari
Domizia (Domitia), a Roman noblewoman	soprano castrato travesti	Giovanni Maria Morosi
Antiocco (Antiochus, King of Commagene), Tito's friend	soprano castrato	Francesco Natali
Fulvio (Fulvius), a Roman courtier	bass	Giuseppe Ignazio Ferrari
Cirene, handmaiden to Berenice	soprano castrato travesti	Luigi Sorè
Roman soldiers, people of Rome
