= Andrea Basili =

Italian composer and music theorist

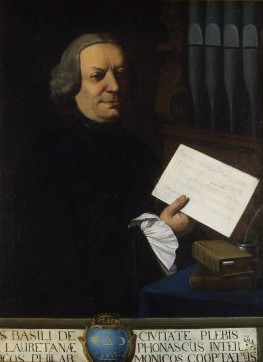
Andrea Basili painted by Carlo Magini

Andrea Basili (Città della Pieve, 16 December 1705 – Loreto, 28 August 1777) was an Italian composer and music theorist. He was the father of Francesco Basili.

His teacher was Tommaso Gaffi. He was maestro di capella at Cathedral of San Lorenzo Martire, Tivoli, then Basilica della Santa Casa.

== Works ==
- Il martirio di Santa Sinforosa e dei sette santi suoi figliuoli nobili Tiburtini (oratorio, libretto di F. A. Lolli, 1737, Tivoli)
- La Passione di Gesù Cristo (oratorio, 1743, Recanati)
- Salmi con testo parafrasato in italiano
- Christus factus est a 4 voci
- Christus factus est a 5 voci
- 3 Miserere a 8 voci
- Miserere a 10 voci
- Missa breve a 4 voci
- Beatus vir a 4 voci
- Confitebor a 4 voci
- Laetatus a 4 voci
- Nisi dominus a 4 voci
- Ave Maria a 4 voci
- Iustorum animae a 5 voci
- Kyrie e Gloria a 4 voci
- Salve regina a 4 voci
- Fuga in ottava tono plagale sopra l'antifono Veni Sponsa Christi (1740)
- Litanie a 3 voci
- Miserere double choir a 8 voci
- Another 150 sacred works
