= La Statira =

- Opera seria by Tomaso Albinoni
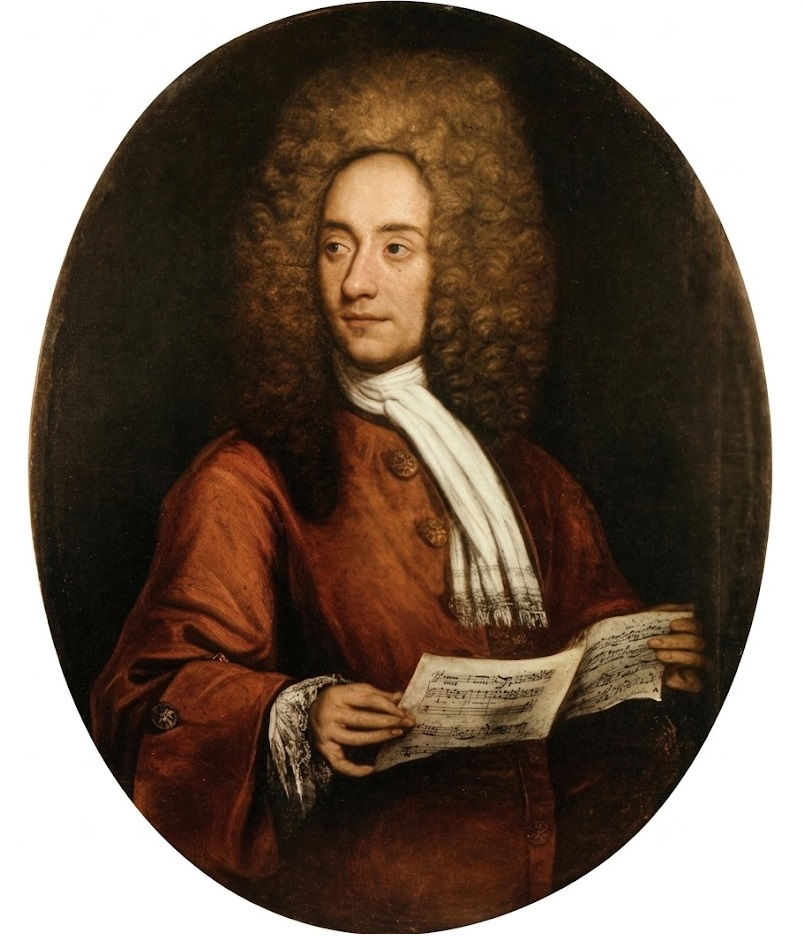
- Portrait of the composer
- Librettist: Apostolo Zeno; Pietro Pariati
- Language: Italian
- Premiere: 1726; Teatro Capranica, Rome

La Statira is an opera seria in three acts by the Italian composer Tomaso Albinoni with a libretto by Apostolo Zeno and Pietro Pariati. It was first performed at the Teatro Capranica in Rome during the Carnival season of 1726. The plot concerns the rivalry between Statira and Barsimo for the throne of Persia.

The singers in the premiere performance were:

Roles	Voice type	Premiere cast, 18 February 1726
Statira	castrato soprano	Gaetano Valletta
Barsina	castrato soprano	Domenico Ricci
Oronte	tenor	Giovanni Francesco Costanzi
Dario	castrato soprano	Giovanni Antonio Reina
Arsace	castrato soprano	Domenico Genovesi
Oribasio	tenor	Gaetano Leuzzi
Idaspe	contralto castrato (?)	Domenico Antonio Angellini
