= Griselda (A. Scarlatti) =

Opera by Alessandro Scarlatti

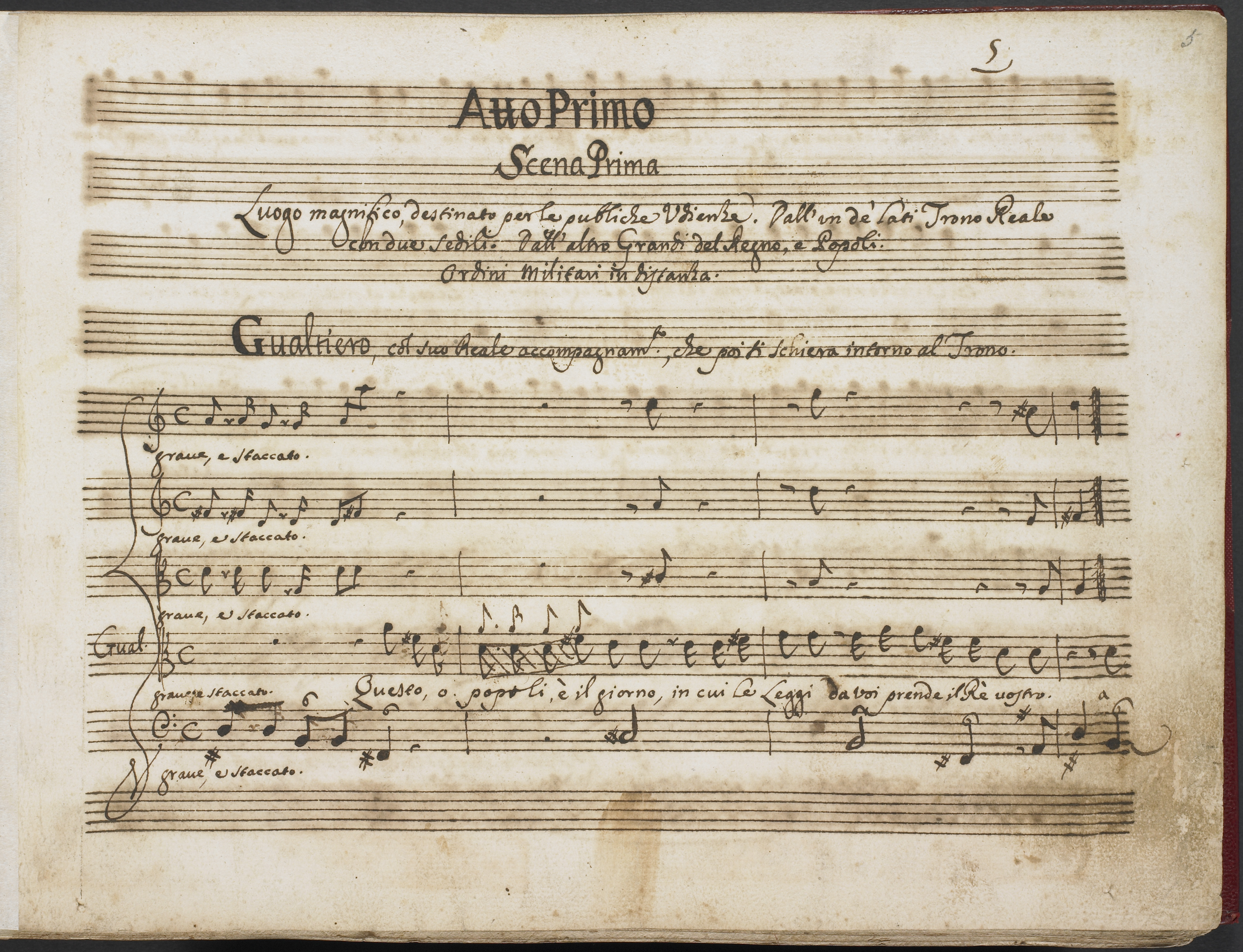
Original manuscript copy of Griselda

Griselda is an opera seria in three acts by the Italian composer Alessandro Scarlatti, the last of Scarlatti’s operas to survive completely today. The libretto is by Apostolo Zeno, with revisions by an anonymous author. Zeno wrote his work in 1701 and it had already been set by Pollarolo and Antonio Maria Bononcini (Tomaso Albinoni, Giovanni Bononcini and Antonio Vivaldi would later produce versions). It is based on the story of Patient Griselda from Boccaccio's tenth day of The Decameron. Scarlatti's opera was first performed at the Teatro Capranica, Rome, in January 1721 with an all-male cast (five castratos and a tenor).

== Roles ==
Roles, voice types, premier cast
Role	Voice type	Premiere cast Conductor: Nicola Fabio
Gualtiero King of Sicily	castrato (contralto)	Antonio Bernacchi
Griselda his wife	castrato (soprano travesti)	Giacinto Fontana "Farfallino"
Costanza their daughter	castrato (soprano travesti)	Giovanni Carestini
Ottone a noble of the court	castrato (contralto)	Andrea Pacini
Corrado Prince of Apulia	tenor	Matteo Luchini
Roberto Younger brother of Corrado	castrato (soprano)	Bartolomeo Bartoli
Everardo Griselda's son	mute	

== Synopsis ==
=== Act 1 ===
Years before the action begins, Gualtiero, King of Sicily, had married a poor shepherdess, Griselda. The marriage was deeply unpopular with the king's subjects and when a daughter, Costanza, was born, the king had to pretend to have her killed while secretly sending her to be brought up by Prince Corrado of Apulia. Now, faced with another rebellion from the Sicilians, Gualtiero is forced to renounce Griselda and promises to take a new wife. The proposed bride is in fact Costanza, who is unaware of her true parentage. She is in love with Corrado's younger brother, Roberto, and the thought of being forced to marry Gualtiero drives her to despair.

=== Act 2 ===
Griselda returns to her home in the countryside where she is pursued by the courtier Ottone, who is in love with her. She angrily rejects his advances. Gualtiero and his followers go out hunting and come across Griselda's cottage. Gualtiero foils an attempt by Ottone to kidnap Griselda and allows her back to the court, but only as Costanza's slave.

=== Act 3 ===
Ottone still resolutely pursues Griselda and Gualtiero promises him her hand as soon as he himself has married Costanza. Griselda declares she would rather die and, moved by her faithfulness, Gualtiero takes her back as his wife. He reveals the true identity of Costanza and allows her to marry Roberto.

== Recordings ==
- Griselda – Lawrence Zazzo, Dorothea Röschmann, Veronica Cangemi, Silvia Tro Santafé, Kobie van Rensburg, Bernarda Fink, Akademie für Alte Musik Berlin conducted by René Jacobs (Harmonia Mundi, 2003)
- Griselda – Raffaele Pe (Gualtiero), Carmela Remigio (Griselda), Francesca Ascioti (Ottone), Mariam Battistelli (Costanza), Krystian Adam (Corrado), Miriam Albano (Roberto), Carlo Buonfrate (Everardo), La Lira Di Orfeo, Coro Ghislieri, George Petrou (Dynamic Blu-Ray and DVD, 2022)
