= Mariam Battistelli =

Italian soprano and actress

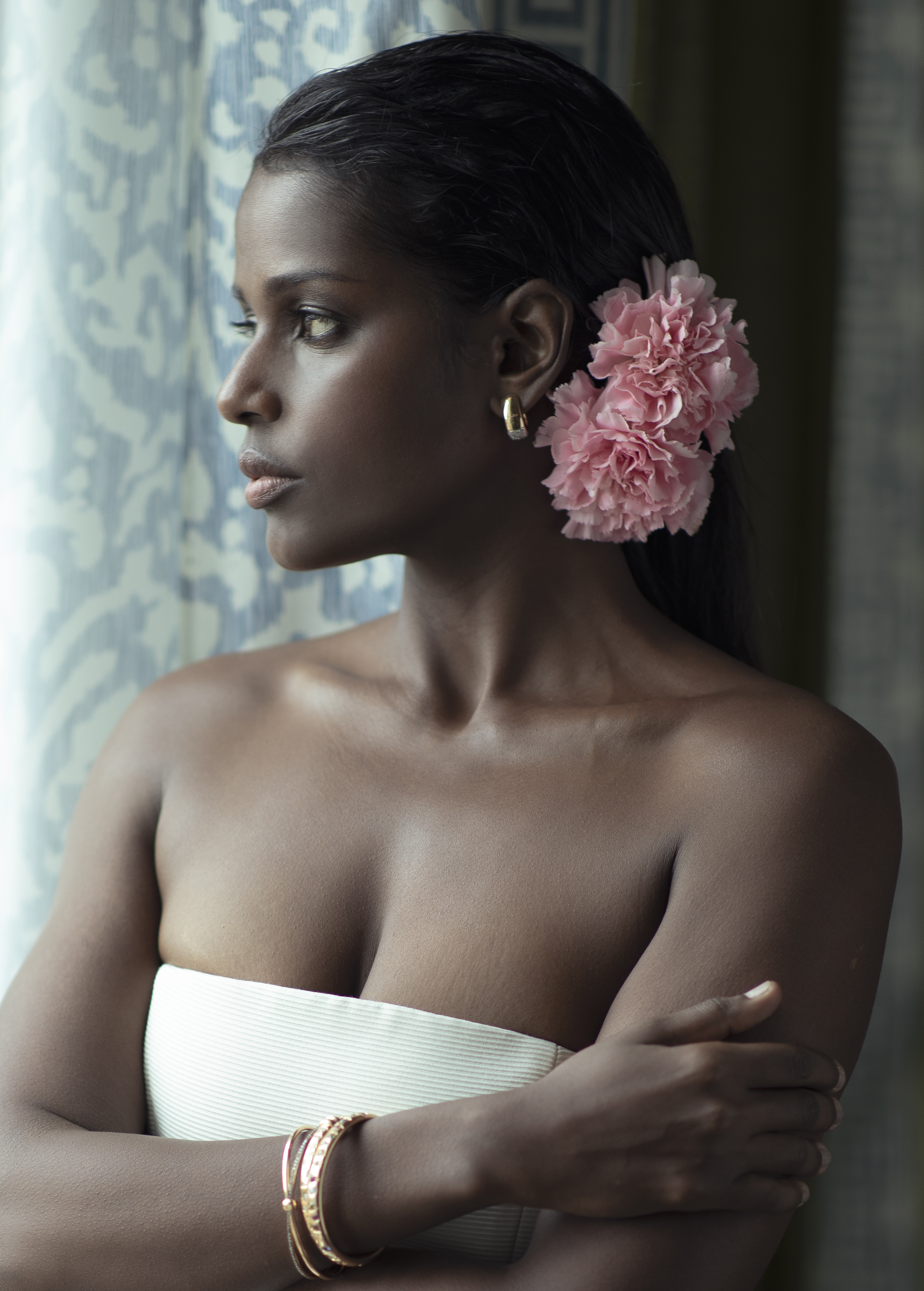
- Battistelli in 2024
- Born: 6 August; Addis Ababa, Ethiopia
- Citizenship: Italy
- Education: Conservatorio Lucio Campiani, Mantua; Centre de Perfeccionament Plácido Domingo, Valencia
- Occupations: Operatic soprano; actress
- Years active: 2014–present
- Height: 1.66 m (5 ft 5 in)
- Website: www.mariambattistelli.com

Mariam Battistelli (born 6 August) is an Ethiopian-born Italian operatic soprano and actress.

== Early life and education ==
Battistelli was left upon her birth at a Christian orphanage in Addis Ababa, Ethiopia, being named by the nuns after Mary, mother of Jesus. At eight months old, she was adopted by a family from Mantua, Italy, where she grew up. After her parents' divorce, she was raised by her mother Laura, who worked as an educator for children with special needs.

Battistelli discovered an interest in opera as a child, when her grandmother introduced her to La traviata and La bohème, and her mother brought her, aged 8, to a performance of Mozart's Don Giovanni at the Teatro Bibiena in Mantua. She joined the children's choir of her local conservatory, where she went on to study Western concert flute and, aged 18, singing, in which she graduated with honours five years later. She attended Enzo Dara's academy and was noticed in at a café in Mantua – where she was working as a waitress – by Spanish tenor Plácido Domingo, who invited her to play the role of a page on the set of Rigoletto a Mantova and selected her for his Centre de Perfeccionament at Palau de les Arts Reina Sofia in Valencia, Spain. She trained there, first as a mezzo-soprano and then as a soprano, from 2013 to 2016. During her studies, she took part in several international opera singing contests in her country.

== Career ==
Battistelli got her first main role on stage in 2014. She came third at the Maria Callas International Competition in Verona in 2014 and the Franca Mattiucci International Competition in Asti in 2015. In 2017, upon winning both first prize and audience prize at the Ottavio Ziino International Lyric Competition for emerging artists in Rome, Battistelli was invited by Dominique Meyer to join the Vienna State Opera, Austria, where she made her debut as Musetta in Puccini's La bohème, Gretel in Humperdinck's Hansel and Gretel and Pamina in Mozart's The Magic Flute. She remained there for three years, expanding her repertoire and marking the beginning of her international career.

Since then, Battistelli has worked with conductors such as Ádám Fischer, Sian Edwards (both conducting the London Philharmonic Orchestra), Christian Thielemann, Speranza Scappucci, Zubin Mehta, Semyon Bychkov, Valery Gergiev, Federico Maria Sardelli, Kim Eun-sun, Steven Mercurio and Dan Ettinger, and has performed at venues which include the Vienna State Opera, La Scala, Glyndebourne, the Opéra de Monte-Carlo, the Hamburg State Opera, the Royal Opera House Muscat, the Tōkyō Bunka Kaikan, La Fenice, the Teatro di San Carlo, the Toulon Opera, the Teatro Comunale di Bologna, the Teatro Lirico di Cagliari, the Teatro Valli and the Teatro Coccia, as well as in Modena, Piacenza and her native Mantua. She has participated in international events like the Chorégies d'Orange and the Festival della Valle d'Itria. Other orchestras with which she has performed include the Vienna Philharmonic, the Vienna Radio Symphony Orchestra, the Orquestra de la Comunitat Valenciana, the Monte-Carlo Philharmonic Orchestra and the Prague Philharmonic Orchestra.

In 2023, the singer reprised the role of Musetta in a La Scala staging of La bohème based on Franco Zeffirelli's. In 2024, she starred in the musical film The Opera!, directed by Davide Livermore and Paolo Gep Cucco and co-produced by Dolce & Gabbana, which was presented at the 19th Rome Film Festival in October 2024 and premiered at La Scala in January 2025. The film, which features arias from several classical operas (including Orfeo ed Euridice, La bohème, Tosca, Madama Butterfly, Turandot, La traviata, Rigoletto, L'italiana in Algeri, Carmen, Mefistofele) as well as pop songs, is based on a stage version from 2017 at Royal Opera House Muscat, also starring Battistelli; in both, she plays the role of a modern Eurydice. She has also worked on opera and operatic pop events and recordings alongside Andrea Bocelli.

Battistelli has cited inspiration from sopranos Shirley Verrett, Jessye Norman, Maria Callas, Reri Grist, Kathleen Battle, Mirella Freni and Ileana Cotrubaș.

== Personal life and other ventures ==
As of January 2025, Battistelli resides in Vienna, Austria. She is also a former American football player and a former athlete, having practiced competitively throughout her youth before she began her singing training. She has been a testimonial for fashion brands Dolce & Gabbana, Etro, Armani and Pomellato.

== Repertoire ==
Composer	Opera/work	Role(s)
Georges Bizet	Carmen	Frasquita
Georges Bizet	Carmen	Micaela
Alma Deutscher	Cinderella	Cinderella
Gaetano Donizetti	Don Pasquale	Norina
Gaetano Donizetti	L'elisir d'amore	Adina
Gaetano Donizetti	L'elisir d'amore	Giannetta
Engelbert Humperdinck	Hansel and Gretel	Gretel
Wolfgang Amadeus Mozart	The Magic Flute	Pamina
Wolfgang Amadeus Mozart	The Marriage of Figaro	Barbarina
Wolfgang Amadeus Mozart	The Marriage of Figaro	Susanna
Wolfgang Amadeus Mozart	Requiem	—N/a
Giovanni Battista Pergolesi	Stabat Mater	—N/a
Giacomo Puccini	La bohème	Musetta
Giacomo Puccini	Manon Lescaut	Il Musico (The Musician)
Giacomo Puccini	Turandot	Liù
Henry Purcell	Dido and Aeneas	Belinda
Gioachino Rossini	L'italiana in Algeri	Elvira
Gioachino Rossini	Mosè in Egitto	Amaltea
Nino Rota	Napoli milionaria	Maria Rosaria
Alessandro Scarlatti	Griselda	Costanza
Johann Strauss	Die Fledermaus	Adele
Richard Strauss	Ariadne auf Naxos	Echo
Giuseppe Verdi	Falstaff	Nannetta
Giuseppe Verdi	Rigoletto	Gilda
Giuseppe Verdi	Un ballo in maschera	Oscar
Antonio Vivaldi	Juditha triumphans	Juditha
Antonio Vivaldi	L'incoronazione di Dario	Statira
Richard Wagner	Parsifal	Blumenmädchen (A Flower Maiden)

== Filmography ==
Year	Title	Role	Notes
2010	Rigoletto a Mantova	Page	Supporting role
2025	The Opera!	Eurydice	Lead role
