= Daniele da Castrovillari =

Italian composer

Daniele da Castrovillari (Cosenza, 1613 - Venice, 29 November 1678) was an Italian composer. His opera La Cleopatra was recreated by Ars Minerva in San Francisco in 2015.
