= Francesco Basili =

Italian composer and conductor

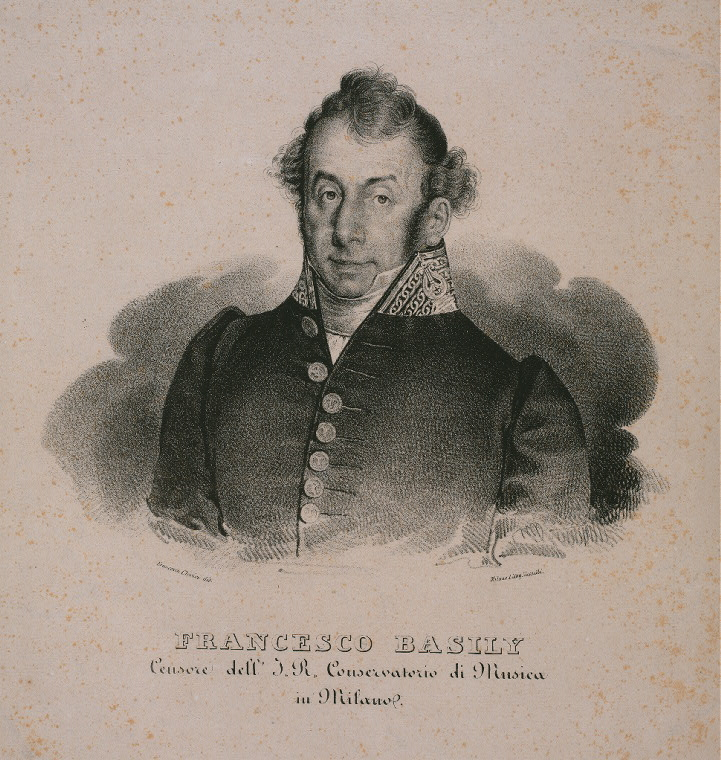
Portrait of Francesco Basili

Francesco Basili (31 January 1767 – 27 March 1850) was an Italian composer and conductor. The son of Andrea Basili, he was born in Loreto and died in Rome.

== Operas ==
- Gl'illinesi (The Illinese), 1818
