= Bernardo Pasquini =

Italian composer (1637–1710)

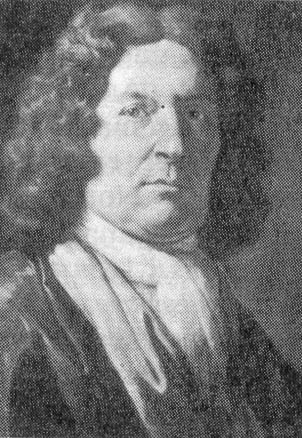
Bernardo Pasquini

Bernardo Pasquini (7 December 1637 – 21 November 1710) was an Italian composer of operas, oratorios, cantatas and keyboard music. A renowned virtuoso keyboard player, he was one of the most important Italian composers for harpsichord between Girolamo Frescobaldi and Domenico Scarlatti, having also made substantial contributions to opera and oratorio.

== Biography ==
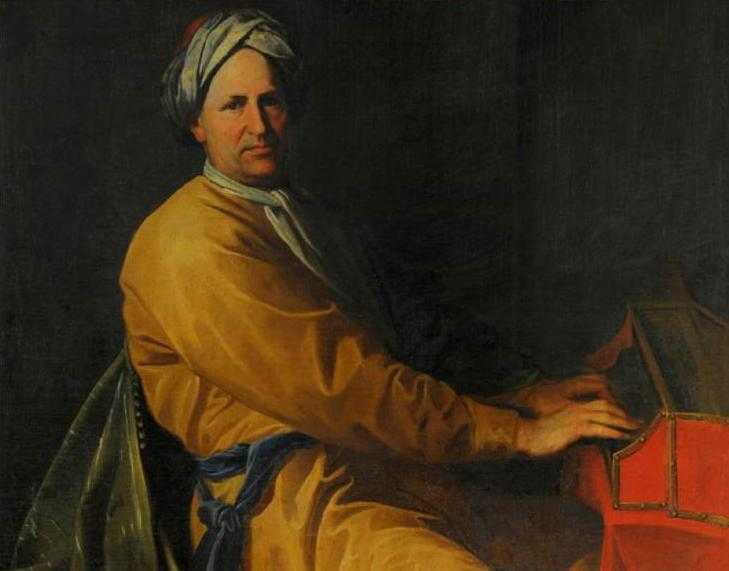
Pasquini owned this portrait of him by Andrea Pozzo.

Pasquini was born in Massa in Valdinievole (today Massa e Cozzile, in the province of Pistoia, Tuscany). He was a pupil of Mariotto Bocciantini in Uzzano (Pistoia). When he was 13, he moved to Ferrara with his uncle Giovanni Pasquini, where, at the age of 16, he would become the organist of Accademia della Morte and serve from 1653 to 1655, a prestigious post that would later serve as a launching pad for his successors.

He was quickly drawn to Rome, and, in 1657, he was appointed as the organist of Santa Maria in Vallicella (Chiesa nuova). In February 1664 he was appointed organist of the basilicas of Santa Maria Maggiore and Santa Maria in Ara Coeli. Finally, after ten years in Rome, in November 1667 he entered into a long period of service of the Borghese family, enjoying the patronage of Prince Giovanni Battista Borghese, and, from May 1693, his son and successor, Prince Marcantonio Borghese.

As a composer and keyboard player, Pasquini collaborated on music performances for a host of famous patrons in Rome, such as cardinals Flavio Chigi, Benedetto Pamphili, and the politically savvy Pietro Ottoboni.

Christina, Queen of Sweden played an important role in his career, and it was in her honour that his operas L'Alcasta (libretto by Giovanni Filippo Apolloni), and Il Lisimaco (libretto by Giacomo Sinibaldi) were performed respectively in 1673 and 1681. His first opera for Queen Christina focused on the theme of just feminine revenge, and included an incredibly ornate dedication which compared the Queen to Alexander the Great.

From 1671 to 1692, Pasquini wrote "no fewer than 16 operas, 15 oratorios and about 70 cantatas." He composed numerous operas, all staged in Rome between 1672 and 1692, and which were performed again or excerpted in shows at several Italian theatres (Florence, Pisa, Naples, Ferrara, Perugia, Genoa, Rimini etc.).

Pasquini was a renowned teacher of harpsichord. Among his pupils were Tommaso Bernardo Gaffi and his nephew Felice Bernardo Ricordati. Many important musicians of the late 1600s and early 1700s had lessons from him including Georg Muffat, who praised Pasquini for having taught him "the Italian way of playing the organ and harpsichord." Pasquini taught many other notable musicians of the era, including Johann Philipp Krieger, Giuseppe Fabbrini, Floriano Arresti, Johann Georg Christian Störl, and Franz Jakob Horneck, and probably also Ferdinand Tobias Richter and Carlo Domenico Draghi.

Together with Arcangelo Corelli and Alessandro Scarlatti, in 1706 Pasquini became a member of the Academy of Arcadia. He is frequently paired with Scarlatti in discussions of keyboard technique and compositional style.

Pasquini died in Rome on 21 November 1710, and was buried in his parish church of San Lorenzo in Lucina. A sepulchral monument, still existing in the church, was erected by his nephew Ricordati and the pupil Gaffi.

His keyboard music is almost entirely preserved in four manuscript volumes (partially autographs), which were compiled between circa 1691 and 1708, by the composer and other collaborators, now preserved in the Berlin State Library (Landsberg 215), and the British Library, London (Add. 31501/I–II–III).

One of his harpsichord pieces was transcribed for orchestra by Ottorino Respighi for his suite Gli uccelli.

== Works ==
Operas

- La sincerità con la sincerità ovvero il Tirinto (1672)
- L'amor per vendetta ovvero l'Alcasta (1673)
- La donna ancora è fedele (1676)
- Trespolo tutore (1677)
- La forza d'amore (before 1679)
- Dov'è amore è pietà (Ipermestra) (1679)
- L'Idalma, ovvero chi la dura la vince (1680)
- Il Sidonio ovvero il raro esempio di costanza e fede (1680)
- Il Lisimaco (1681)
- La Tessalonica (1683)
- Arianna (1685)
- Il silentio d'Arpocrate (1686)
- Santa Dimna figlia del re d'Irlanda (1687; only act 2; act 1 Alessandro Melani; act 3 Alessandro Scarlatti)
- I giochi troiani (1688)
- La caduta del regno delle Amazzoni (1690)
- Alessio (1690)
- Il Colombo overo l'India scoperta (1690)
- Eudossia (1692)

Oratorios

- Caino e Abele (1671)
- Agar (1675)
- Assuero (1675)
- Sant'Alessio (1675)
- Santa Agnese (1678)
- Divae Clarae triumphus (1682)
- L'idolatria di Salomone (1686)
- I fatti di Mosè nel deserto (1687)
- Il martirio dei santi Vito, Modesto e Crescenzia (1687)
- La purità trionfante overo Martiniano il santo (1688 in collaboration with G. L. Lulier, T. B. Gaffi, G. Ercole, L. Amadori)
- La sete di Cristo (1689)
- La caduta di Salomone (1693)
- Davide trionfante contro Goliath (1694)
- S. Maria di Soria (1694)
- S. Filippo Neri (cantata)

Toccata with Cuckoo Scherzo
performed by Sylvia Kind

Pasquini composed around sixty cantatas, mainly for one voice and continuo, but also for two or three voices, with or without instruments, and continuo.

He celebrated the ubiquitous cuckoo in Toccata con lo Scherzo del Cucco, written in florid style in 1702. It is perhaps the best keyboard cuckoo piece in existence for it imitates the cuckoo's notes, which seems to have been a favourite device in early baroque music.

In 2016, Arnaldo Morelli, a scholar from the University of L'Aquila, lamented the tendency among musicologists and music histories to label Pasquini merely as an exponent of keyboard music, without attention to his substantial output of oratorios and opera.

== Selected recordings ==
- Mottetti a voce sola e composizioni per organo, Alea Musica, Alexandra Nigito. Tactus (TC.631802)
- Oratorio Caino e Abele, conductor Alessandro De Marchi. Symphonia 1990
- Oratorio Santa Agnese, Consortium Carissimi. 2 CD Arion
- 2 passion cantatas – Hor ch'il Ciel fra densi horrori; Padre, Signore e Dio. Sharon Rostorf-Zamir, Furio Zanasi, Capella Tiberina, conductor Giovanni Caruso. Brilliant Classics, DDD, 2010
- Bernardo Pasquini – Suites and Variations, Lydia Maria Blank, harpsichord, 2015, Etcetera (KTC 1532)
- La sete di Christo, oratorio, Concerto romano, conductor Alessandro Quarta, 2015, Christophorus 77398
- Pasquini: Sonate per Gravecembalo, Manuscript S.B.P.K. Landsberg 215, Roberto Loreggian. Brilliant Classics, 2019.
- Pasquini: Sonate per Gravicembalo, Roberto Loreggian. Chandos, 2004 (CHAN 0704).

== Notes ==
Sources

- Morelli, Arnaldo (2016). La virtù in corte. Bernardo Pasquini (1637–1710) (in Italian). Lucca: Libreria Musicale Italiana. ISBN 978-8870968873.
