= Tommaso Gaffi =

Italian Baroque composer

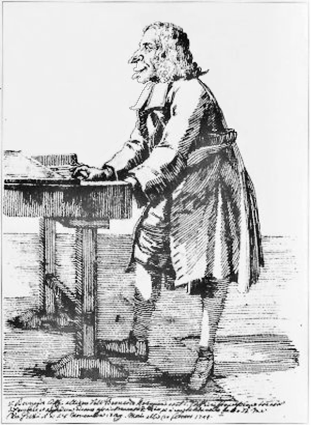
Tommaso Bernardo Gaffi, composer

Tommaso Bernardo Gaffi (14 December 1667 - Rome, 11 February 1744) was an Italian baroque composer. He was a pupil of Bernardo Pasquini, organist of the church of Santa Maria Maggiore, where Gaffi succeeded him in 1704. As Pasquini, he enjoyed the patronage of cardinals Benedetto Pamphili and Pietro Ottoboni, as well as Prince Francesco Maria Ruspoli. His own students included Girolamo Chiti and Andrea Basili.

== Works, editions and recordings ==
- Cantate da cammera (1700)
- La Micole (Modena, 1689)
- Abigaille (with F. Bambini - Modena, 1689)
- La forza del divino amore (Rome, 1691); recording 2004
- Adam (Latin, with F. Ciampelletti - Rome, 1692), lost
- Sant'Eugenia (Florence, 1693), lost
- L'Innocenza gloriosa (Florence, 1693)
- Il sacrificio del Verbo umano (Rome, 1700)
