= Giacomo Francesco Bussani =

Giacomo Francesco Bussani was a Venetian librettist.

He wrote seven known librettos; 5 for Antonio Sartorio, and one each for Carlo Pallavicino and Pietro Agostini. Among those he set for Sartorio was Giulio Cesare in Egitto, which was later adapted by Nicola Francesco Haym for Georg Friedrich Händel's Giulio Cesare.
