= Carlo Sigismondo Capece =

Italian dramatist and librettist

Carlo Sigismondo Capece (21 June 1652 in Rome – 12 March 1728 in Polistena) was an Italian dramatist and librettist. Capece was court poet to Queen Maria Casimira of Poland, who was living in exile in Rome, and is best remembered today for the libretto of La resurrezione (HWV 47, 1708) a sacred oratorio by George Frideric Handel. He also provided the Libretto for operas including Domenico Scarlatti's Tolomeo e Alessandro (1711) and Ifigenia in Aulide (1714), as well as Caldara's Tito e Berenice (1714).
