= Mignard =

Mignard is a French surname. Notable people with the surname include:

- François Mignard (born 1949), French astronomer
  - 12898 Mignard, main belt asteroid discovered by François Mignard
- Nicolas Mignard (1606–1668), French painter
- Paul Mignard (1639–1691), French painter and etcher
- Pierre Mignard (1612–1695), French painter
- Pierre II Mignard (1640-1725), French painter and architect
