= 1725 in music =

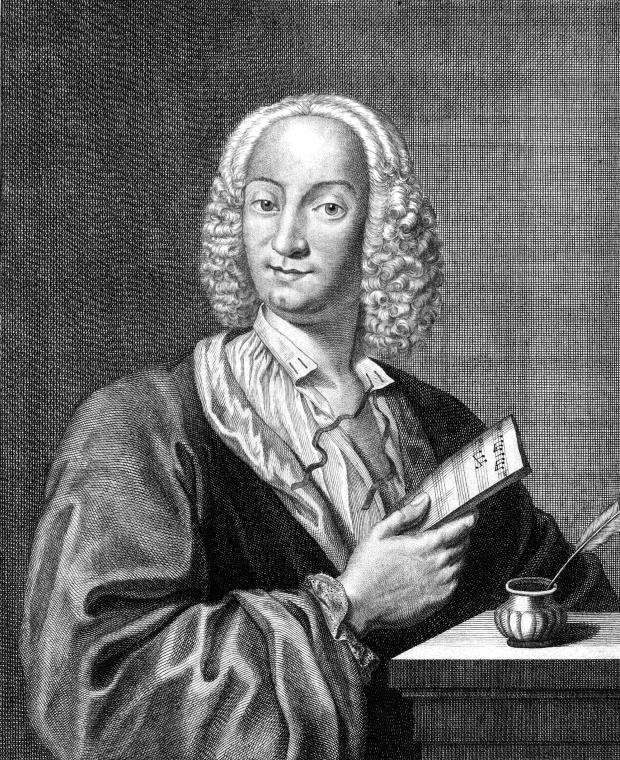
Antonio Vivaldi by François Morellon la Cave, 1725

The year 1725 in music involved some significant events.

== Events ==
- March 25 (Palm Sunday) – First performance of Johann Sebastian Bach's chorale cantata Wie schön leuchtet der Morgenstern, BWV 1, at St. Thomas Church, Leipzig.
- March 30 – Repeat performance of Johann Sebastian Bach's St John Passion (BWV 245, BC D 2b [including BWV 245a, b, and c]) at St. Thomas Church, Leipzig (using parts from his Weimarer Passion).
- Giovanni Battista Pergolesi goes to Naples to study under Gaetano Greco. Domenico Scarlatti is also in Naples at this time.
- Nineteen-year-old Giovanni Battista Martini is appointed chapel-master of the Franciscan church at Bologna.

== Publications ==
- Johann Sebastian Bach – Notebook for Anna Magdalena Bach, Book 2
- Joseph Bodin De Boismortier
  - 6 Sonatas for 3 Flutes, Op. 7
  - 6 Sonatas for 2 Flutes, Op. 8
- Johann Fux – Gradus ad Parnassum (Vienna)
- Concerti di flauto, violini, violetta, e basso di diversi autori (24 concertos for recorder, strings and continuo) with works by Alessandro Scarlatti, Mancini, Valentine, Barbella, Domenico Natale Sarro, Giovanni Battista Mele. Undated manuscript, Naples: Biblioteca del Conservatorio di musica S. Pietro a Majella, c.1725.
- François Couperin – L'Apothéose de Lully (Paris)
- John Loeillet – 12 Trio Sonatas, Op. 2 (London)
- Marin Marais – Pièces de viole, Livre 5 (Paris)
- Georg Philipp Telemann – Harmonischer Gottes-Dienst (continues 1726)
- Antonio Vivaldi – Il cimento dell'armonia e dell'inventione, Op. 8 (contains The Four Seasons though they were likely written earlier)

== Classical music ==
- Johann Sebastian Bach
  - Ach Gott, wie manches Herzeleid, BWV 3, premiered Jan. 14 in Leipzig
  - Bleib bei uns, denn es will Abend werden, BWV 6, first version premiered Apr. 2 in Leipzig
  - Schwingt freudig euch empor, BWV 36, first version
  - Am Abend aber desselbigen Sabbats, BWV 42
  - Selig ist der Mann, BWV 57, premiered Dec. 26 in Leipzig
  - Also hat Gott die Welt geliebt, BWV 68, premiered May 21 in Leipzig
  - Ihr werdet weinen und heulen, BWV 103, premiered Apr. 22 in Leipzig
  - Unser Mund sei voll Lachens, BWV 110, premiered Christmas in Leipzig
  - Liebster Immanuel, Herzog der Frommen, BWV 123, premiered Jan. 6 in Leipzig
  - Meinen Jesum lass ich nicht, BWV 124, premiered Jan. 7 in Leipzig
  - Musette in D major, BWV Anh.126
  - Herr Jesu Christ, wahr' Mensch und Gott, BWV 127, premiered Feb. 11 in Leipzig
  - Auf Christi Himmelfahrt allein, BWV 128, premiered May 25 in Leipzig
  - Süsser Trost, mein Jesus kömmt, BWV 151, premiered Dec. 27 in Leipzig
  - Tue Rechnung! Donnerwort, BWV 168, premiered Jul. 29 in Leipzig
  - Er rufet seinen Schafen mit Namen, BWV 175, premiered May 22 in Leipzig
  - Es ist ein trotzig und verzagt Ding, BWV 176, premiered May 25 in Leipzig
  - Sie werden euch in den Bann tun, BWV 183, premiered May 13 in Leipzig
  - Zerreißet, zersprenget, zertrümmert die Gruft, BWV 205, premiered Aug. 10 in Leipzig
  - Oster-Oratorium, BWV 249, premiered Apr. 10 in Leipzig
- George Frideric Handel – Trio Sonata in D minor
- Johann Adolf Hasse – Antonio e Cleopatra
- Benedetto Marcello – O prole nobile di magni principi, S.628
- Wilhelm Hieronymus Pachelbel – Toccata in G Major
- Christian Petzold – Minuet in G major (formerly attributed to J.S. Bach as BWV Anh.114)
- Giovanni Benedetto Platti – 12 Cello Sonatas
- John Sheeles – Suites of Lessons for the Harpsicord or Spinnett

== Opera ==
- Attilio Ariosti – Dario
- Antonio Caldara – Venceslao
- George Frideric Handel – Rodelinda, regina de' Longobardi, HWV 19
- Leonardo Leo – Zenobia in Palmira
- Nicola Porpora – Siface
- Georg Philipp Telemann – Pimpinone, TWV 21:15
- Pietro Torri – Venceslao
- Leonardo Vinci
  - Astianatte, premiered December 2 in Naples
  - Didone abbandonata, composed. Premiered 1726.
  - Elpidia, premiered May 11 in London
  - Il trionfo di Camilla
- Antonio Vivaldi – L'inganno trionfante in amore, RV 721

== Popular music ==
- Henry Carey – Sally in Our Alley

== Births ==
- April 20 – Johann Friedrich Klöffler, German conductor, composer (died 1790)
- July 24 – John Newton, clergyman and poet ("Amazing Grace") (died 1807)
- August 15 – Ferdinando Bertoni, Italian composer and organist (died 1813)
- November 8 – Johann George Tromlitz, flautist (died 1805)
- December 25 – Esteban Salas y Castro, Cuban composer (died 1803)
- probable – Joaquim Joze Antunes, harpsichord maker (died c.1790)
- ca 1725 – Antonio Lolli, Italian violinist and composer (died 1802)

== Deaths ==
- January 27 – Silvio Stampiglia, librettist (born 1664)
- February 7 – Johann Philipp Krieger, composer (born 1649)
- October 3 – Jean-Baptiste Drouart de Bousset, composer (born 1662)
- October 22 – Alessandro Scarlatti, opera composer, father of Domenico (born 1660)
- date unknown
  - Mathieu Lanes, composer (born 1660)
  - Robert de Visée, lutenist (born c. 1650)
- probable – Christian Ritter, composer
