= Classicism =

Art movement and architectural style

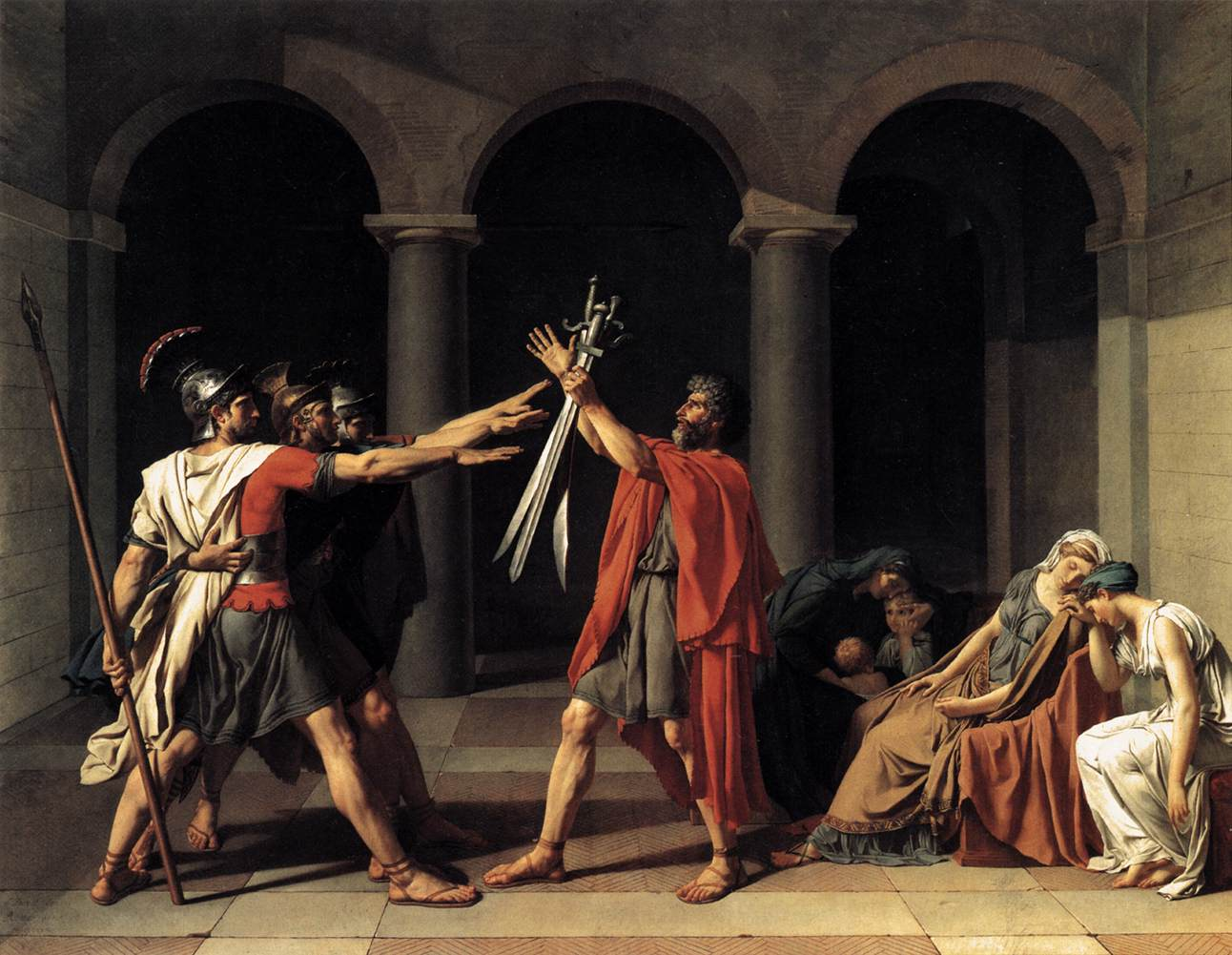
Jacques-Louis David, Oath of the Horatii, 1784, an icon of Neoclassicism in painting

Classicism, in the arts, refers generally to a high regard for a classical period, classical antiquity in the Western tradition, as setting standards for taste which the classicists seek to emulate. In its purest form, classicism is an aesthetic attitude dependent on principles based in the culture, art and literature of ancient Greece and Rome, with the emphasis on form, simplicity, proportion, clarity of structure, perfection and restrained emotion, as well as explicit appeal to the intellect.

The art of classicism typically seeks to be formal and restrained: of the Discobolus Sir Kenneth Clark observed, "if we object to his restraint and compression we are simply objecting to the classicism of classic art. A violent emphasis or a sudden acceleration of rhythmic movement would have destroyed those qualities of balance and completeness through which it retained until the present century its position of authority in the restricted repertoire of visual images." Classicism, as Clark noted, implies a canon of widely accepted ideal forms, in the Western canon that he was examining in The Nude (1956).

Classicism is a force that is often present in post-medieval European and European-influenced traditions; however, some periods felt themselves more connected to the classical ideals than others, particularly the Age of Enlightenment, when Neoclassicism was an important movement in the visual arts.

== General term ==
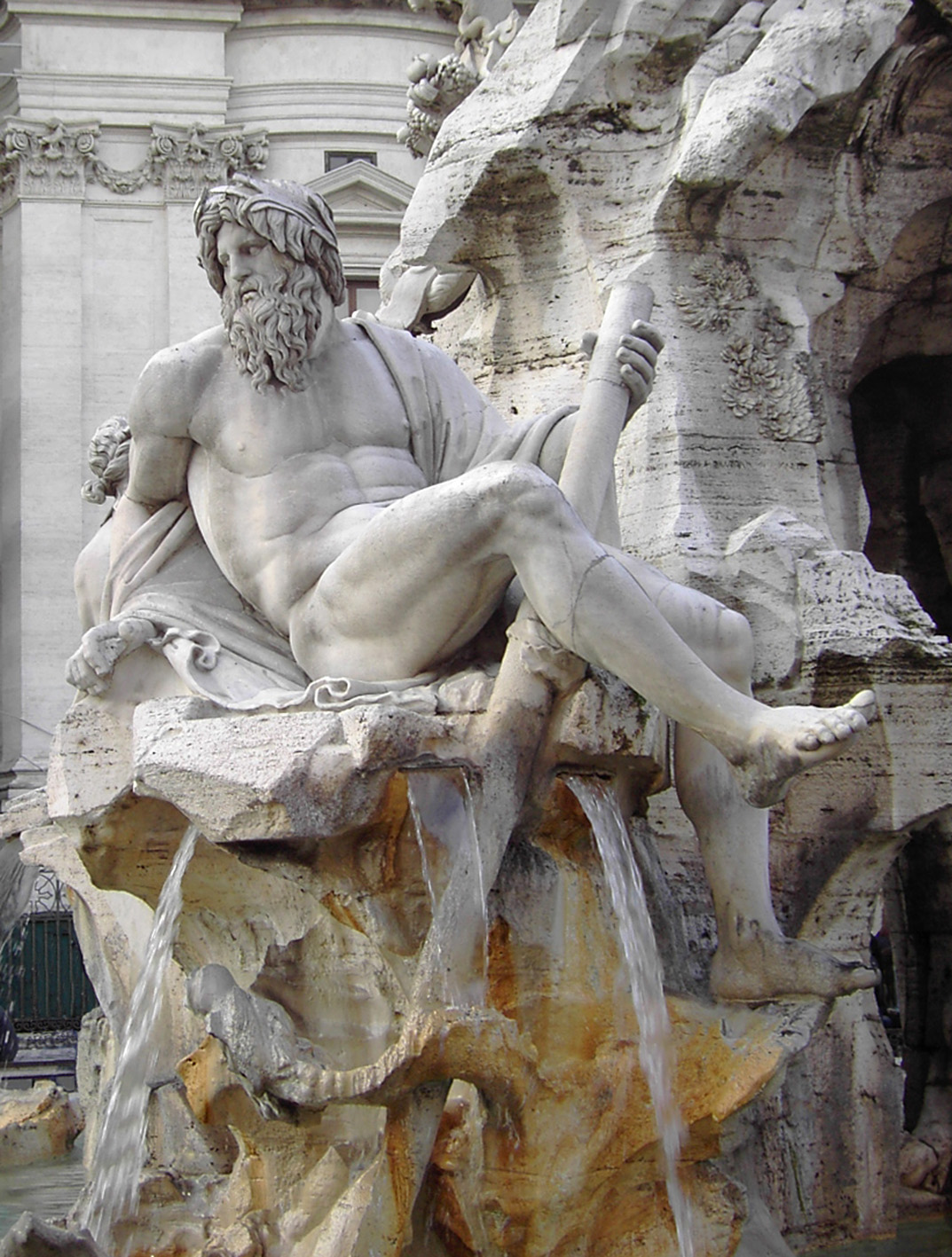
Fountain of the Four Rivers, Bernini, 1651.

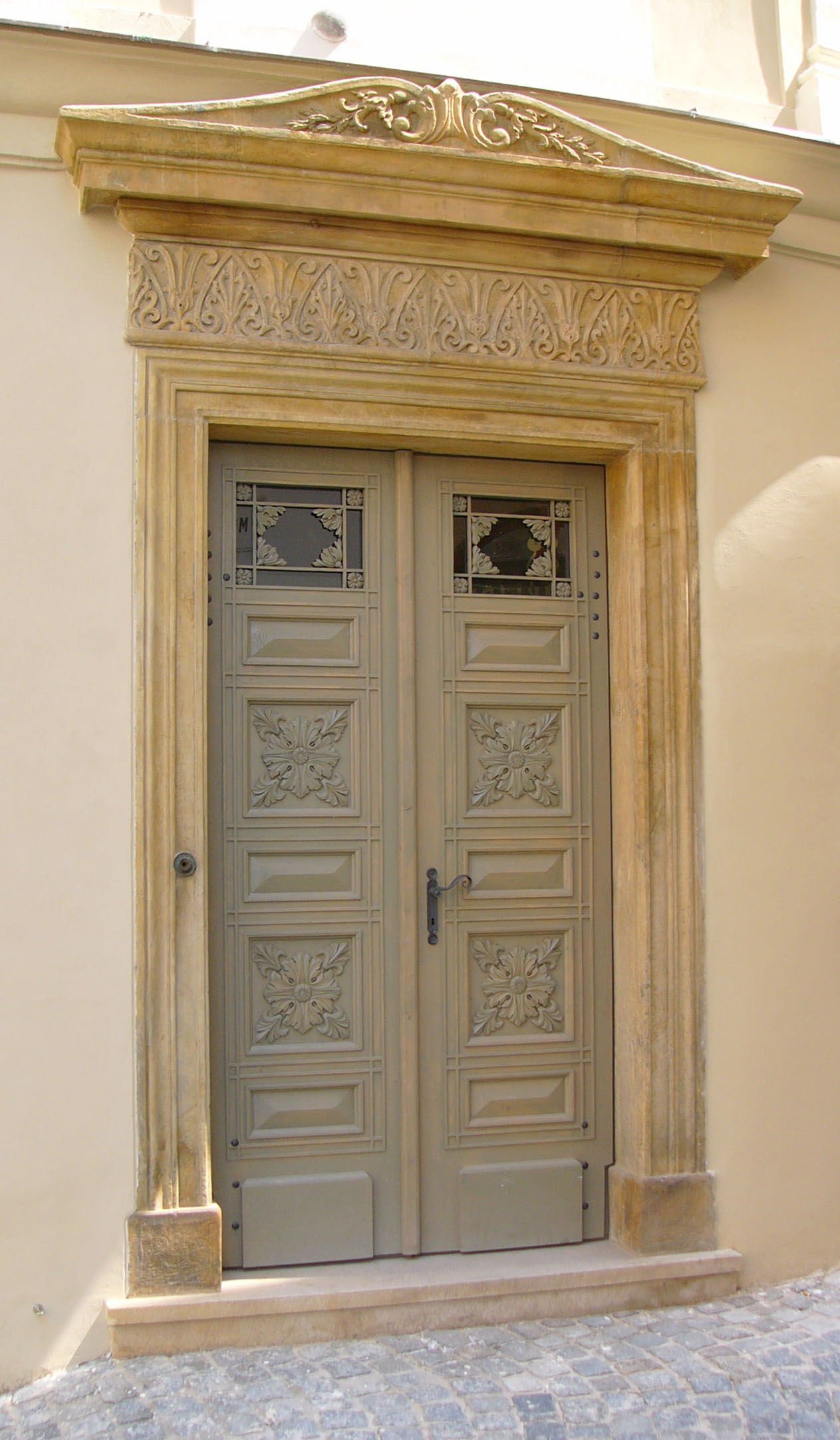
Classicist door in Olomouc, Czech Republic.

Classicism is a specific genre of philosophy, expressing itself in literature, architecture, art, and music, which has Ancient Greek and Roman sources and an emphasis on society. It was particularly expressed in the Neoclassicism of the Age of Enlightenment.

Classicism is a recurrent tendency in the Late Antique period, and had a major revival in Carolingian and Ottonian art. There was another, more durable revival in the Italian Renaissance when the fall of Byzantium and rising trade with the Islamic cultures brought a flood of knowledge about, and from, the antiquity of Europe. Until that time, the identification with antiquity had been seen as a continuous history of Christendom from the conversion of Roman Emperor Constantine I. Renaissance classicism introduced a host of elements into European culture, including the application of mathematics and empiricism into art, humanism, literary and depictive realism, and formalism. Importantly it also introduced Polytheism, or "paganism", and the juxtaposition of ancient and modern.

The classicism of the Renaissance led to, and gave way to, a different sense of what was "classical" in the 16th and 17th centuries. In this period, classicism took on more overtly structural overtones of orderliness, predictability, the use of geometry and grids, the importance of rigorous discipline and pedagogy, as well as the formation of schools of art and music. The court of Louis XIV was seen as the center of this form of classicism, with its references to the gods of Olympus as a symbolic prop for absolutism, its adherence to axiomatic and deductive reasoning, and its love of order and predictability.

This period sought the revival of classical art forms, including Greek drama and music. Opera, in its modern European form, had its roots in attempts to recreate the combination of singing and dancing with theatre thought to be the Greek norm. Examples of this appeal to classicism included Dante, Petrarch, and Shakespeare in poetry and theatre. Tudor drama, in particular, modeled itself after classical ideals and divided works into Tragedy and Comedy. Studying Ancient Greek became regarded as essential for a well-rounded education in the liberal arts.

The Renaissance also explicitly returned to architectural models and techniques associated with Greek and Roman antiquity, including the golden rectangle as a key proportion for buildings, the classical orders of columns, as well as a host of ornament and detail associated with Greek and Roman architecture. They also began reviving plastic arts such as bronze casting for sculpture, and used the classical naturalism as the foundation of drawing, painting and sculpture.

The Age of Enlightenment identified itself with a vision of antiquity which, while continuous with the classicism of the previous century, was shaken by the physics of Sir Isaac Newton, the improvements in machinery and measurement, and a sense of liberation which they saw as being present in the Greek civilization, particularly in its struggles against the Persian Empire. The ornate, organic, and complexly integrated forms of the baroque were to give way to a series of movements that regarded themselves expressly as "classical" or "neo-classical", or would rapidly be labelled as such. For example, the painting of Jacques-Louis David was seen as an attempt to return to formal balance, clarity, manliness, and vigor in art.

The 19th century saw the classical age as being the precursor of academicism, including such movements as uniformitarianism in the sciences, and the creation of rigorous categories in artistic fields. Various movements of the Romantic period saw themselves as classical revolts against a prevailing trend of emotionalism and irregularity, for example the Pre-Raphaelites. By this point, classicism was old enough that previous classical movements received revivals; for example, the Renaissance was seen as a means to combine the organic medieval with the orderly classical. The 19th century continued or extended many classical programs in the sciences, most notably the Newtonian program to account for the movement of energy between bodies by means of exchange of mechanical and thermal energy.

The 20th century saw a number of changes in the arts and sciences. Classicism was used both by those who rejected, or saw as temporary, transfigurations in the political, scientific, and social world and by those who embraced the changes as a means to overthrow the perceived weight of the 19th century. Thus, both pre-20th-century disciplines were labelled "classical" and modern movements in art which saw themselves as aligned with light, space, sparseness of texture, and formal coherence.

In present-day philosophy, classicism is used as a term particularly in relation to Apollonian over Dionysian impulses in society and art; that is a preference for rationality, or at least rationally guided catharsis, over emotionalism.

== In the theatre ==
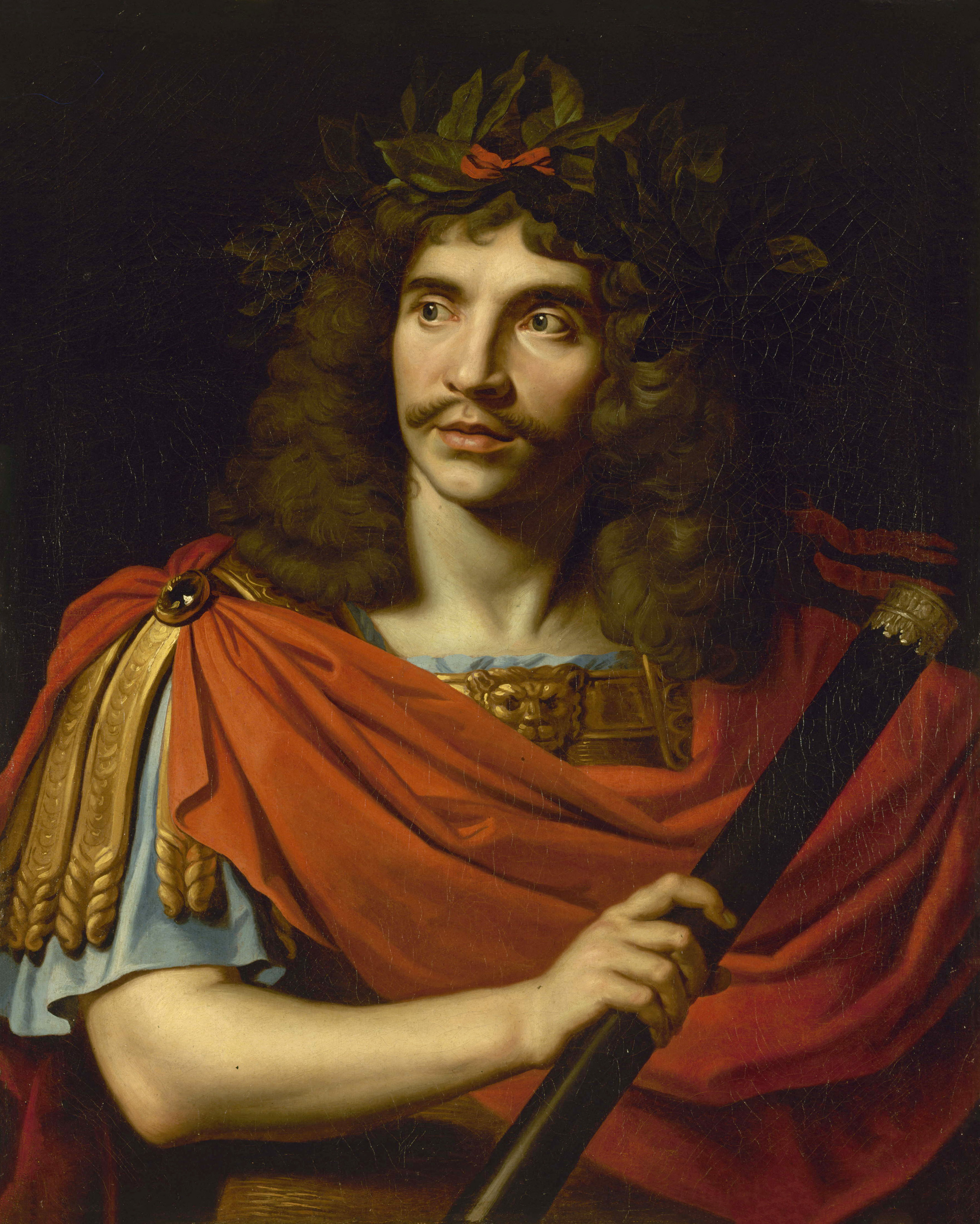
Molière in classical dress, by Nicolas Mignard, 1658.

Classicism in the theatre was developed by 17th-century French playwrights from what they judged to be the rules of Greek classical theatre, including the "Classical unities" of time, place and action, found in the Poetics of Aristotle.

- Unity of time referred to the need for the entire action of the play to take place in a fictional 24-hour period
- Unity of place meant that the action should unfold in a single location
- Unity of action meant that the play should be constructed around a single 'plot-line', such as a tragic love affair or a conflict between honour and duty.

Examples of classicist playwrights are Pierre Corneille, Jean Racine and Molière. In the period of Romanticism, Shakespeare, who conformed to none of the classical rules, became the focus of French argument over them, in which the Romantics eventually triumphed; Victor Hugo was among the first French playwrights to break these conventions.

The influence of these French rules on playwrights in other nations is debatable. In the English theatre, Restoration playwrights such as William Wycherley and William Congreve would have been familiar with them. William Shakespeare and his contemporaries did not follow this Classicist philosophy, in particular since they were not French and also because they wrote several decades prior to their establishment. Those of Shakespeare's plays that seem to display the unities, such as The Tempest, probably indicate a familiarity with actual models from classical antiquity.

The most famous 18th-century Italian playwright and librettist Carlo Goldoni created a hybrid style of playwriting (combining the model of Molière with the strengths of Commedia dell'arte and his own wit and sincerity).

== In literature ==
Literary classicism drew inspiration from the qualities of proportion of the major works of ancient Greek and Latin literature.

Significant Classical writers of the 17th–18th centuries (principally, playwrights and poets) include Pierre Corneille, Jean Racine, John Dryden, William Wycherley, William Congreve, Jonathan Swift, Joseph Addison, Alexander Pope, Voltaire, Carlo Goldoni, Friedrich Gottlieb Klopstock, and Gotthold Ephraim Lessing.

== In architecture ==
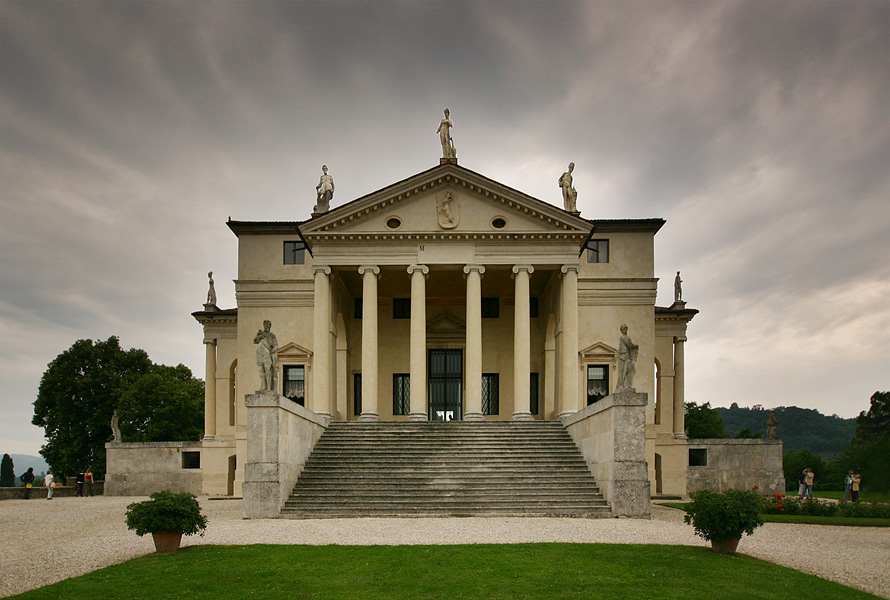
Villa Rotonda, Palladio, 1591

Classicism in architecture developed during the Italian Renaissance, notably in the writings and designs of Leon Battista Alberti and the work of Filippo Brunelleschi. It places emphasis on symmetry, proportion, geometry and the regularity of parts as they are demonstrated in the architecture of Classical antiquity and, in particular, the architecture of Ancient Rome, of which many examples remained.

Orderly arrangements of columns, pilasters and lintels, as well as the use of semicircular arches, hemispherical domes, niches and aedicules replaced the more complex proportional systems and irregular profiles of medieval buildings. This style quickly spread to other Italian cities and then to France, Germany, England, Russia and elsewhere.

In the 16th century, Sebastiano Serlio helped codify the classical orders and Andrea Palladio's legacy evolved into the long tradition of Palladian architecture. Building on these influences, the 17th-century architects Inigo Jones and Christopher Wren firmly established classicism in England.

For the development of classicism from the mid-18th century onwards, see Neoclassical architecture.

== In the fine arts ==
- For Greek art of the 5th century B.C.E., see Classical art in ancient Greece and the Severe style

Italian Renaissance painting and sculpture are marked by their renewal of classical forms, motifs and subjects. In the 15th century, Leon Battista Alberti was important in theorizing many of the ideas for painting that came to a fully realized product with Raphael's School of Athens during the High Renaissance. The themes continued largely unbroken into the 17th century, when artists such as Nicolas Poussin and Charles Le Brun represented the more rigid classicism. Like Italian classicizing ideas in the 15th and 16th centuries, it spread through Europe in the mid- to late 17th century.

Later classicism in painting and sculpture from the mid-18th and 19th centuries is generally referred to as Neoclassicism.

== Political philosophy ==
Classicism in political philosophy dates back to the ancient Greeks. Western political philosophy is often attributed to the great Greek philosopher Plato. Although political theory of this time starts with Plato, it quickly becomes complex when Plato's pupil, Aristotle, formulates his own ideas. "The political theories of both philosophers are closely tied to their ethical theories, and their interest is in questions concerning constitutions or forms of government."

However, Plato and Aristotle are not the seedbed but simply the seeds that grew from a seedbed of political predecessors who had debated this topic for centuries before their time. For example, Herodotus sketched out a debate between Theseus, a king of the time, and Creon's messenger. The debate simply shows proponents of democracy, monarchy, and oligarchy and how they all feel about these forms of government. Herodotus' sketch is just one of the beginning seedbeds for which Plato and Aristotle grew their own political theories.

Another Greek philosopher who was pivotal in the development of Classical political philosophy was Socrates. Although he was not a theory-builder, he often stimulated fellow citizens with paradoxes that challenged them to reflect on their own beliefs. Socrates thought "the values that ought to determine how individuals live their lives should also shape the political life of the community." he believed the people of Athens involved wealth and money too much into the politics of their city. He judged the citizens for the way they amassed wealth and power over simple things like projects for their community.

Just like Plato and Aristotle, Socrates did not come up with these ideas alone his ideals stem from Protagoras and other "sophists". These "teachers of political arts" were the first to think and act as Socrates did. Where the two diverge is in the way they practiced their ideals. Protagoras' ideals were loved by Athens, whereas Socrates challenged and pushed the citizens and was not as loved.

In the end, ancient Greece is to be credited with the foundation of Classical political philosophy.

== See also ==
- Classical tradition
- Quarrel of the Ancients and the Moderns
- Weimar Classicism
