= L'Apothéose de Lully =

1725 trio sonata by François Couperin

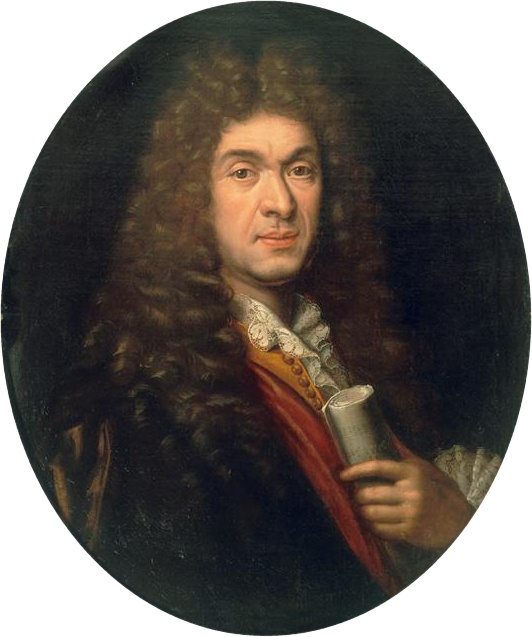
Jean-Baptiste Lully, by Paul Mignard

L'Apothéose de Lully, or Concert instrumental sous le titre d'Apothéose composé à la mémoire immortelle de l'incomparable Monsieur de Lully (English: The Apotheosis of Lully or Instrumental concert with the title of an Apotheosis composed in the immortal memory of the incomparable Monsieur de Lully) is a trio sonata composed by François Couperin. The piece was first published in 1725, a year after his L'Apothéose de Corelli, to pay homage to Jean-Baptiste Lully.

== Background ==
Lully, a master of French Baroque music and the father of the French overture, famously disavowed any Italian influence in French music of the period. Couperin, however, wanted to accomplish a réunion des goûts: reconciling the national distinctions of style, tradition, and forms of interpretations that differed between France and Italy. As Couperin himself states in the preface to Les goûts-réunis, "I have always highly regarded the things which merited esteem, without considering either composer or nation; and the first Italian sonatas which appeared in Paris more than 30 years ago, and which encouraged me to start composing some myself, to my ming wronged neither the works of M de Lully, not those of my ancestors, who will always be more admirable than imitable. And so, by a right which my neutrality gives me, I remain under the happy influence which has guided me until now."

Despite hailing from a large family of French musicians, Couperin is credited with bringing the trio sonata form, greatly developed in Italy by Arcangelo Corelli, to France. In 1724, he published the Apotheosis of Corelli, as a tribute to the symmetrical and precise Italian Baroque style that made Corelli an Italian Baroque master. A year later, the Apotheosis of Lully was first published, "to do honour to the greatest man in music whom the preceding century had produced", and to reconcile the differences between French and Italian Baroque music. By depicting the union of Lully and Corelli, both in Elysium and in musical style, Couperin continued to break down the barriers between French and Italian music, proving that a union between the two can be successful.

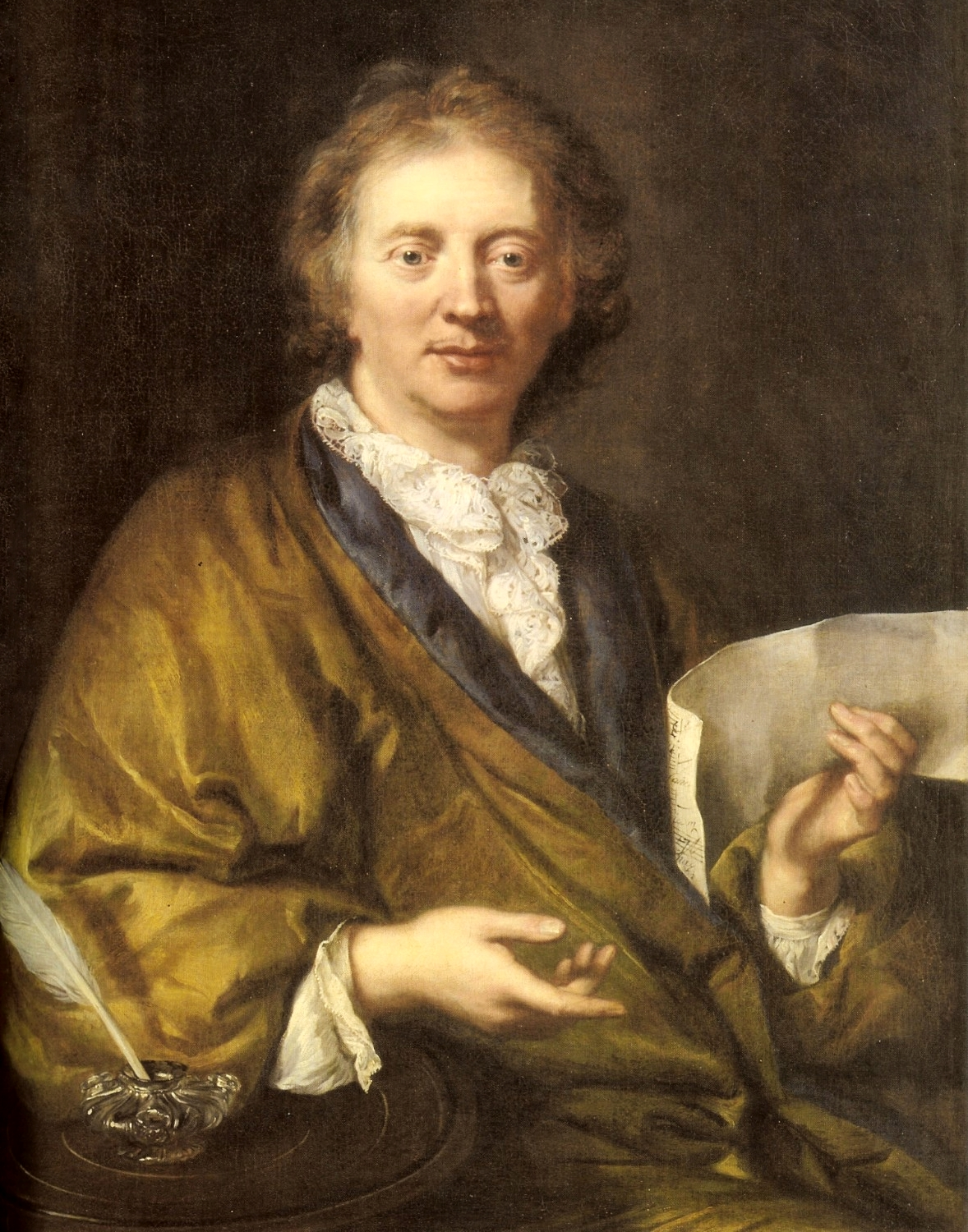
Couperin (anon.), collection of the Palace of Versailles

In 1949, the piece was featured on the first microgroove record to be produced in Europe, recorded by André Charlin and conducted by Roger Désormière.

Couperin himself called L'Apothéose de Lully a "harmonic panegyric". It has been called "the composer's artistic and aesthetic manifesto" and "one of the final flowerings of [Couperin's] ambition".

== Structure ==
The piece is a trio sonata originally scored for two treble instruments and continuo, which was a standard instrumentation for this genre. Couperin was not usually specific about the instrumentation of his chamber music, though, Louis Hüe, who engraved the 1725 publication, recommended performing the Apotheosis with two harpsichords, saying that "I find it is often easier to bring these two instruments together, than four people" (i.e. two violinists, a cellist or violist, and a harpsichordist).

The piece, like L'Apothéose de Corelli, is a characteristic example of program music. Couperin shows Lully in the Elysian Fields, performing music in the delicate and well-ornamented French style. A graceful air follows, after which Mercury descends to Lully to warn him of Apollo's imminent arrival. Apollo in this work can be interpreted as representative of the Sun King, Louis XIV, whom Couperin had a close working relationship with during his lifetime. Mercury's descent, with quick notes in the treble lines, is characteristic of Lully's own techniques for composing Zephyr and windlike passages. Apollo's descent is notably nobler than Mercury's. Rumbles and laments are heard from Lully's jealous contemporaries, after which Lully ascends to Parnassus. Corelli and the Italian Muses welcome him in typical Italian Baroque style: instead of writing lentement to indicate the tempo, Couperin writes the Italian largo; the movement is instructed to be played with Notes égales, et marquées (with equal and marked notes), instead of with the lightly-swung feeling typical of French Baroque music; even the clef of the treble instruments is changed from the French, where the Note G is on the bottom line of the staff, to the standard clef favored in Italy where G is one line higher. Lully thanks Corelli in starkly contrasting French style. Apollo then argues that musical perfection can be created only by reconciling the French and Italian styles. He shows this in an overture that combines both styles: the first treble instrument uses the French clef, while the second treble instrument uses the Italian clef. Parts of the overture are in Lully's French overture style, while other sections are characteristic of Corelli's trio sonatas. Throughout the overture, the Muses, depicted by the treble instruments, are often playing in unison, indicating ambivalence of style. Two airs follow, with Lully and Corelli alternating melody, accompaniment, and style. The Apotheosis of Lully ends with peace at Parnassus and a newly-coined, four-movement Sonade en trio – Couperin, and his French Muses, argue that the French spelling of "sonata" should mirror that of "ballade" and "serenade", showing that a réunion des goûts is not only possible but can be entirely successful.

Despite the seemingly somber nature of the two deceased composers meeting in the afterlife, this piece was primarily intended for entertainment as a satirical scenario to draw comparisons and bring unison between the works of Corelli and Lully in a light manner.

Most movements have descriptive titles:

1	Lully aux Champs-Élisés, concertant avec les Ombres liriques	Lully in the Elysian Fields performing with musicianly Shades
2	Air pour les Mêmes	Air for the same performers
3	Vol de Mercure aux Champs Élisés, pour avertir qu'Apollon y va descendre	Mercury's flight to the Elysian Fields to warn that Apollo is about to descend
4	Descente d'Apollon, qui vient offrir son violon à Lully, et sa place au Parnasse	The Descent of Apollo who comes to offer his violin to Lully and a place on Parnassus
5	Rumeur souteraine, causée par les Auteurs contemporains de Lully	Subterranean rumblings from Lully's contemporaries
6	Plaintes des Mêmes, pour des Flûtes, ou des Violons très adoucis	Laments from the same, played by flutes or very sweet-toned violins
7	Enlévement de Lully au Parnasse	The raising of Lully to Parnassus
8	Accüeil entre doux et agard, fait à Lully par Corelli, et par les Muses italiénes	Welcome, half friendly and half hostile, given to Lully by Corelli and the Italian Muses
9	Remerciment de Lully à Apollon	Lully's thanks to Apollo
10	Apollon persuade Lully, et Corelli, que la réunion des Goûts François et Italien[s] doit faire la perfection de la Musique	Apollo persuades Lully and Corelli that the reunion of French and Italian styles must create musical perfection
11	Air léger, Lully joüant le sujet, et Corelli l'acompagnant	Air léger: Lully playing the subject, and Corelli accompanying
12	Second Air, Correli joüant le sujet à son tour, que Lulli acompagne	Second Air: Corelli playing the melody in turn, while Lully accompanies
13	La Paix du Parnasse, faite aux conditions, sur la Remontrance des Muses Françoises, que lorsqu'on y parleroit leur langue, on diroit dorénavant Sonade, Cantade, ainsi qu'on prononce Ballade, Sérénade, &c.	The Peace of Parnassus, which, following a protest from the French Muses, is made on the condition that when their language is spoken, one will henceforth say Sonade and Cantade, as one says Ballade and Sérénade, etc.
14	Saillie: Vivement – Rondement – Vivement	Exit: Lively – Brisk – Lively
