= Baton (conducting) =

Stick used by conductors

A baton is a stick that is used by conductors primarily to enlarge and enhance the manual and bodily movements associated with directing an ensemble of musicians.

== Description ==
Modern batons are generally made of a lightweight wood, fiberglass or carbon fiber which is tapered to a comfortable grip called a "bulb" that is usually made of cork, oak, walnut, rosewood, or occasionally aluminium and that may be tailored to a conductor's needs. Professional conductors often have personal specifications for a baton based on their own physical demands and the nature of the performance: Sir Henry Wood and Herbert von Karajan are some examples. Historic examples of their construction include one given to the French composer Louis-Antoine Jullien in the mid 1850s prior to his first visit to the United States: it is described as "a gorgeous baton made of maplewood, richly mounted in gold and set with costly diamonds."

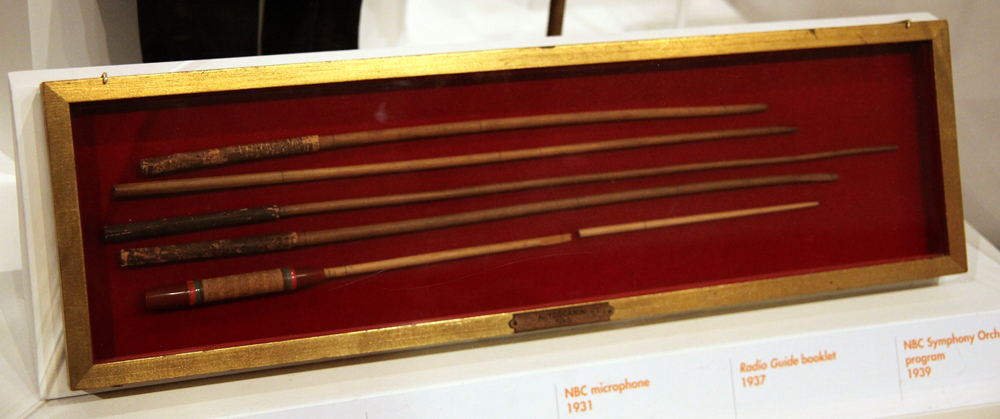
Batons used by Arturo Toscanini, on display at a Smithsonian museum.

Batons have historically varied in length from about 10 to 24 inches (250 to 610 mm) though a range of between 12 and 16 inches (300 and 410 mm)(or near the length of the conductors forearm) is more commonly used today; Henry Wood once requested the use of a 24-inch baton. When Gaspare Spontini arrived in Dresden in 1844, Wagner had a baton made from a thick ebony staff with ivory knobs at either end. Spontini purportedly held the baton in the center with a fist, using it like a marshal's staff—not for beating time but rather for commanding the opera.

== Usage ==
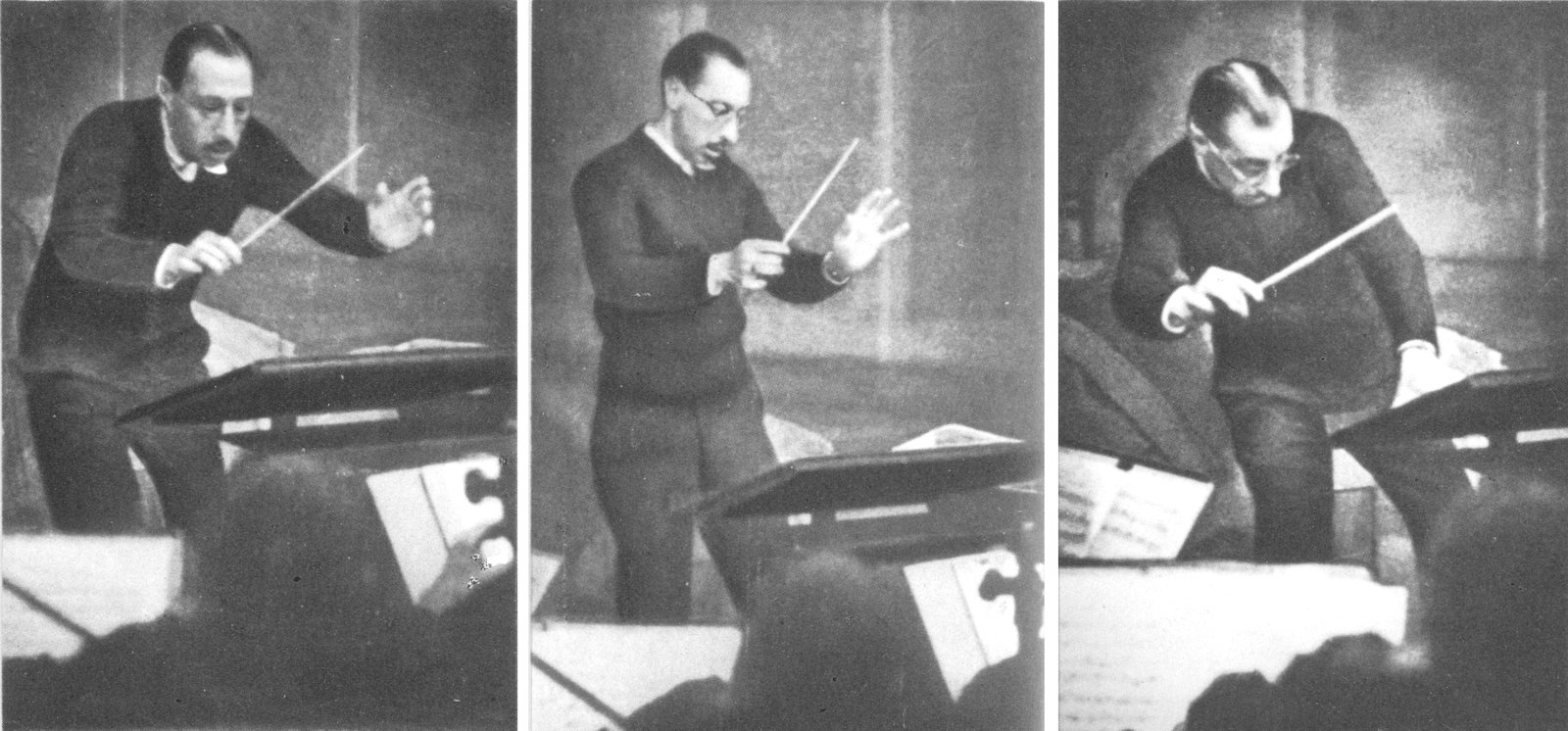
Igor Stravinsky conducting with a baton (1929).

Conductors view their gestures as the primary means to communicate musical ideas, whether or not they choose to use batons. Leonard Bernstein is quoted as saying, "If one [the conductor] uses a baton, the baton itself must be a living thing, charged with a kind of electricity, which makes it an instrument of meaning in its tiniest movement."

The usual way of holding the baton is between the thumb and the first two fingers with the grip in against the palm of the hand. The baton is usually held in the right hand though some left-handed conductors, for instance Paavo Berglund, hold it in the left. Young left-handed conductors are, however, sometimes encouraged to learn right-handed conducting. Some conductors like Pierre Boulez, Georges Prêtre, Leopold Stokowski, Valery Gergiev, Dimitri Mitropoulos, Kurt Masur, Seiji Ozawa and Yuri Temirkanov, however, choose not to hold a baton, preferring to conduct only with their hands. This method is common with smaller groups and choral conductors. If the conductor does not use a baton, their hands must do the job with equal clarity, and the gestures must be first and always meaningful in terms of the music. According to Gustav Meier, most conductors use a baton to "increase the visibility of the beat information".

== History ==
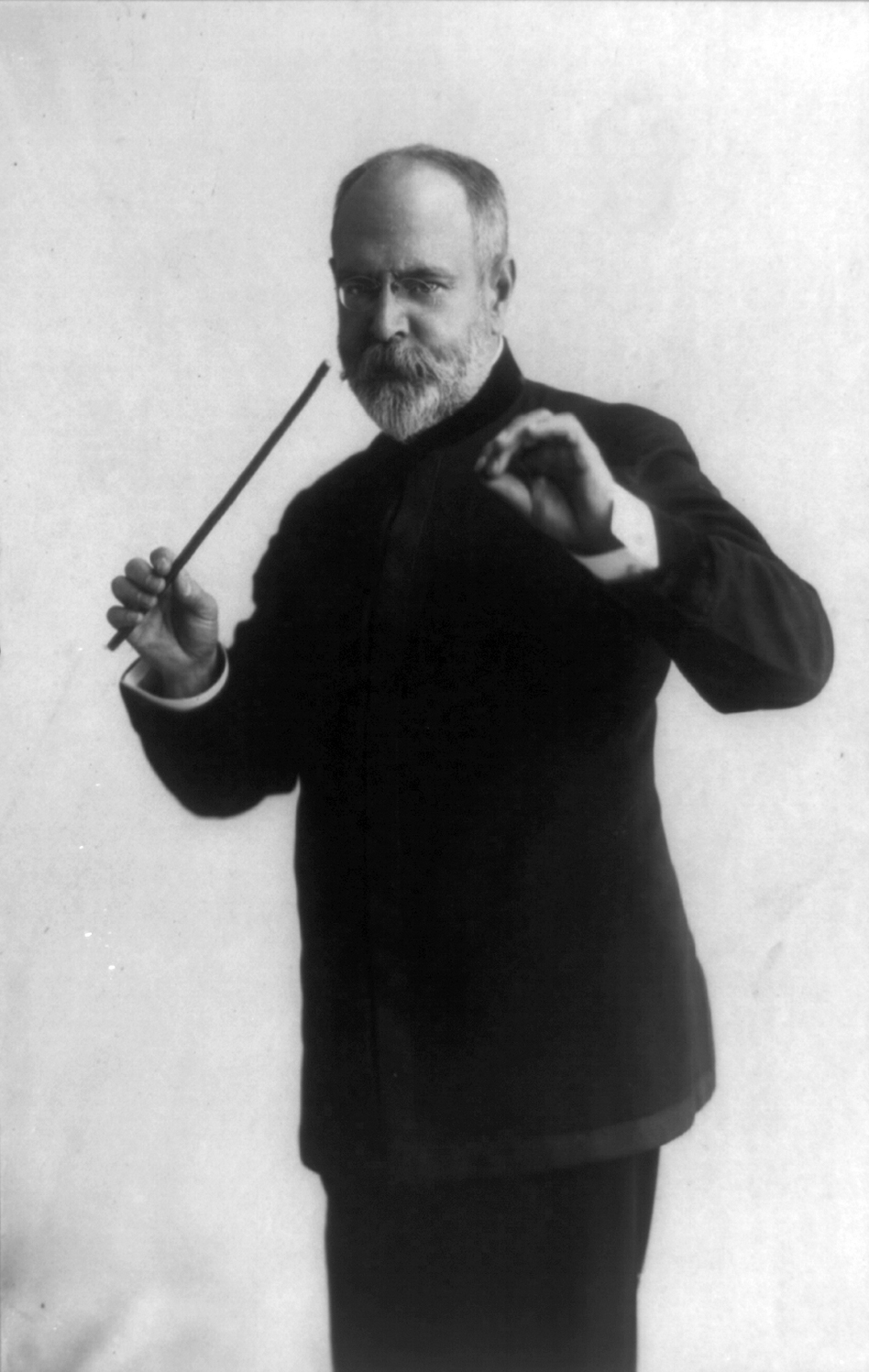
John Philip Sousa conducting with a baton (1911).

Before the use of the baton, orchestral ensembles were conducted from the harpsichord or the first violin lead. Conductors first began to use violin bows or rolled pieces of paper before the modern baton was introduced.

=== Ancient history ===
The first reported use of the conducting staff in a performance dates back to 709 BC, during which the leader, "Pherekydes of Patrae, giver of rhythm" had,

... stationed himself in the centre and had placed himself on a high seat, waving a golden staff, and the players on the flute and cythara were ... placed in a circle around him ... now when Pherekydes with his golden staff gave the signal, all the art-experienced men began in one and the same time ...

=== 16th–18th centuries ===
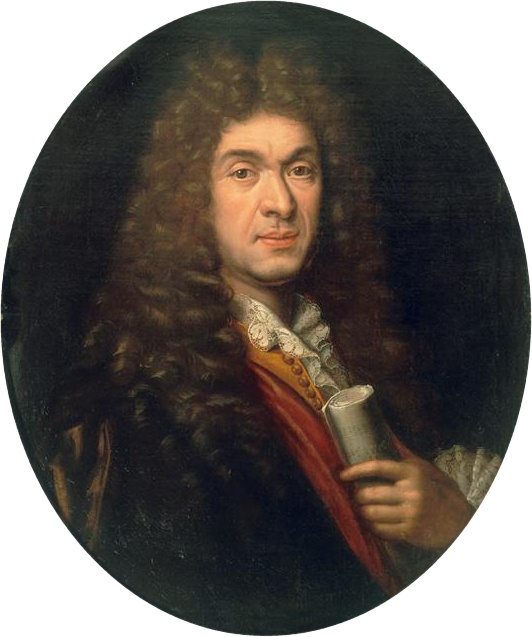
J. B. Lully by Paul Mignard

On 8 January 1687, Jean-Baptiste Lully was conducting a Te Deum to celebrate Louis XIV of France's recent recovery from illness. As was the common practice, he was beating time by banging a long staff (a precursor to the baton; the French word bâton actually meaning "staff") against the floor when he struck his toe, creating an abscess. The wound turned gangrenous, but Lully refused to have his toe amputated and the infection spread, resulting in his death on 22 March.

Different eyewitnesses to the premiere performance of Joseph Haydn's Creation in April of 1798 indicate that Haydn used a baton to conduct with his hands. Said Princess Eleanor von Liechtenstein, "Hayden [sic] gave the tempo with his two hands;" and wrote a Swedish relative of Franz Berwald, "on a higher level stood Haydn himself with his baton."

=== 19th century ===
The baton began to gain in popularity between 1820 and 1840. The first batons were narrow and conical wooden wands that had an engraving of three rings near the bottom that indicated the handle. The Halle Orchestra reported that Daniel Turk used a baton in 1810, with motions so exuberant that he occasionally hit the chandelier above his head and showered himself with glass.

Louis Spohr claimed to have introduced the baton to England on 10 April 1820, while conducting his second symphony with the Philharmonic Society in London. Witnesses noted that the conductor "sits there and turns over the leaves of the score but after all, he cannot, without ... his baton, lead on his musical army". It is more likely that he used his baton in rehearsal than in concert. It was 1825 when George Smart reported that he sometimes 'beat time in front with a short stick'.

When Felix Mendelssohn returned to London in 1832, despite objections from violin leaders, he was encouraged to go on with his baton. Despite the initial disagreement, the baton was in regular use at the Philharmonic a year later.

=== Jazz batons ===
In the early 1940s, while big band jazz music was on the rise, the use of a conductor became paramount to the success of the ensemble. To accommodate this, these conductors started using specialized "jazz batons". These specialized batons were slightly shorter than standard batons, ranging from 6 to 9 inches in length. Several famous jazz conductors that used these specific batons include Quincy Jones, Gunther Schuller and Richard Rogers. Although they are rarely used today, many accomplished jazz conductors use them during ballads.
