= Carl de Nys =

Belgian-French priest and musicologist

Carl de Nys (26 March 1917 – 4 April 1996) was a Belgian-French priest and musicologist.

== Biography ==
De Nys was born in Eupen, Belgium. After completing his studies at Verviers and Namur, and then in the Vosges department at the seminary of Saint-Dié and the Faculty of Arts of Nancy, de Nys was ordained priest in 1941 and taught literature and philology at Épinal for a few years. Fascinated by music, he was immediately encouraged to devote himself to it by Bishop Monseigneur Blanchet, promoted rector of the Institut Catholique de Paris and sensitive to the spiritual influence that musical culture could have on him. From then on, it was in a veritable parallel career of musicologist that de Nys launched himself in the early 1950s, and his many activities in this field made him an essential figure of musical life in France during the second half of the twentieth century.

A tireless worker, a methodical researcher, enthusiastic and often inspired, he travelled through the European libraries and exhumed a wealth of unpublished works, shedding light on so many forgotten composers, as well as some lesser-known pages of Bach and his sons, Joseph Haydn and Michael Haydn, and finally Mozart. Fascinated by Baroque and classical literature, he was nevertheless interested in all the repertoires, up to contemporary creation. Thus it was at his request that André Jolivet wrote in 1956 the oratorio La Vérité de Jeanne.

Always eager to share his discoveries with the general public, he demonstrated remarkable pedagogical qualities and knew how to exploit them in multiple fields. He was the source of many concerts and festivals, including that of Epinal in the early 1950s. From that time onwards, he was also a radio man, producing programs at the Saarländischer Rundfunk and the Radiodiffusion-Télévision Française; he was thus the host of Sinfonia Sacra with Jean Witold or else with Armand Panigel in the famous Tribune des Critiques de disques. He was passionate about the growing microgroove. He actively collaborated in the series "Les Discophiles français", directed by Henri Screpel, quickly became a close friend of the Erato company, and joined André Charlin in 1959, of whom he was the artistic director at the Centre d'Enregistrement des Champs-Élysées, several titles receiving the Grand Prix du Disque. Co-founder of the "Musique en Wallonie" then heavily involved in the Koch-Schwann label, in 1961, he founded with Hélène Salomé the Cultural Centre of Valprivas, dedicated to musicological research and now possessing an exceptional library and recording collection. We owe him the rediscovery of the Te Deum by Marc-Antoine Charpentier, whose orchestral opening is used as an indicative by the Eurovision, particularly during the ceremonies of the Eurovision Song Contest.

A music journalist at La Croix and Diapason, a lecturer, he was also the author of numerous specialized articles and books on religious music, participated in the Larousse de la Musique as well as the Encyclopédie de la Musique in Bibliothèque de la Pléiade, and launched the famous Discothèque Idéale.

De Nys died in Valprivas, France, at the age of 75.

== Writings ==
- Numerous collaborations in music magazines and encyclopedias
- More than 800 texts for record sleeves
- Co-author of several books
- 1957: Sinfonia sacra I
- 1960: La discothèque idéale (Presse Universitaire Paris)
- Nys, Carl de (1980). La cantate. Que sais-je?. Paris: Presses universitaires de France. ISBN 978-2-1303-6482-5. OCLC 299459379.
- Nys, Carl de (1982). La musique religieuse de Mozart. Paris: Presses universitaires de France. ISBN 978-2-1303-7261-5. OCLC 300398669.
