= Pierre Mignard =

French painter (1612–1695)

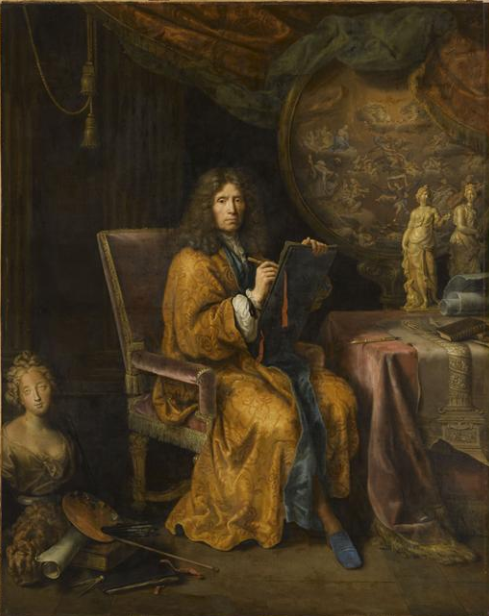
- Self-portrait, 1670–1690
- Born: 17 November 1612; Troyes, France
- Died: 30 May 1695 (aged 82); Paris, France

Director of the Académie de Peinture et de Sculpture
- In office 1690–1695
- Monarch: Louis XIV
- Preceded by: Charles Le Brun
- Succeeded by: Noël Coypel

Pierre Mignard or Pierre Mignard I (French pronunciation: [pjɛʁ miɲaʁ]; 17 November 1612 – 30 May 1695), called "Mignard le Romain" to distinguish him from his brother Nicolas Mignard, was a French painter known for his religious and mythological scenes and portraits. He was a near-contemporary of the Premier Peintre du Roi Charles Le Brun with whom he engaged in a bitter, life-long rivalry.

== Life ==
Pierre Mignard was born in Troyes in 1612, the son of Pierre Mignard and Marie Gallois. He came from a family of artisans. He was the younger brother of Nicolas, who became a painter and etcher who was mainly active in Avignon and was known as Mignard d'Avignon. Nicolas had two sons, Paul who became a painter and etcher and Pierre who became a painter and architect. To distinguish his nephew Pierre from his uncle, the nephew was called "Pierre II" or "Le Chevalier".

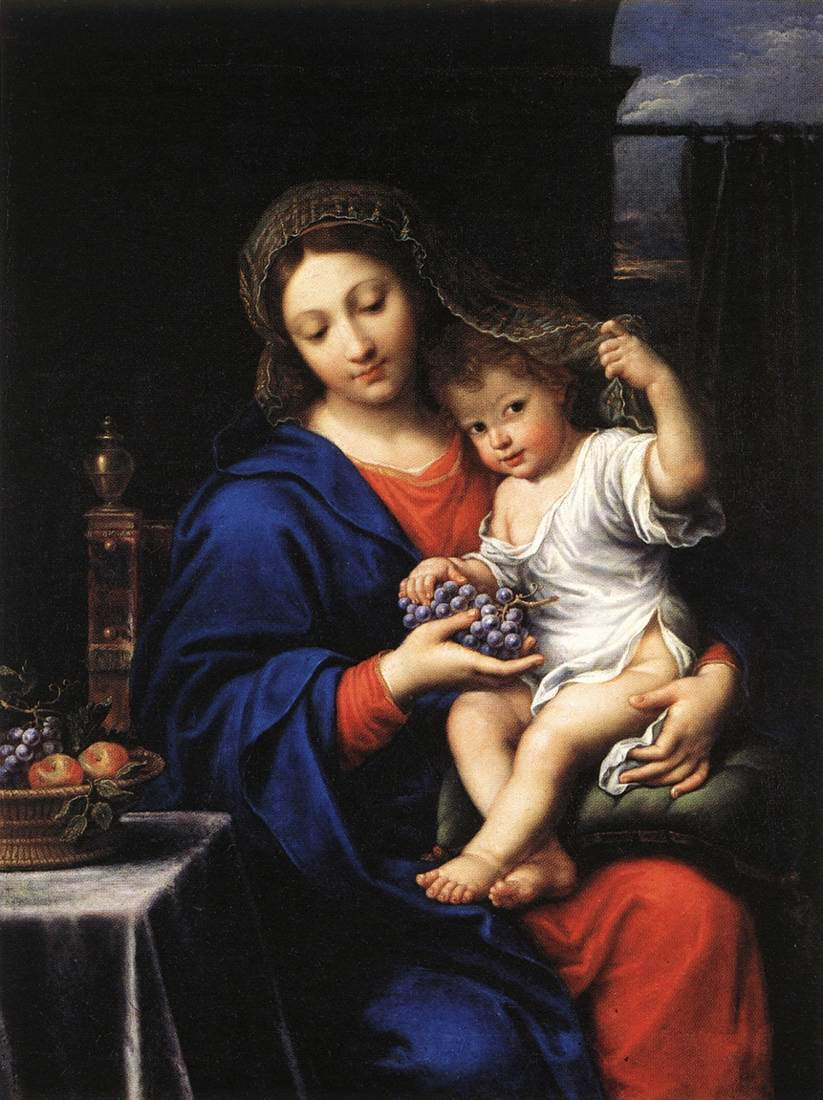
The Virgin with the grapes, 1640

Pierre Mignard trained in Bourges with the Mannerist painter Jean Boucher. He later spent time making copies of the Mannerist works in the château of Fontainebleau. He then studied for a period in the studio of Simon Vouet. Mignard left for Rome in 1635 where he would stay about 22 years. It is because of his long residence in Rome that he got the nickname 'Mignard le Romaine'.

In Rome he painted religious commissions. He was particularly known for his many images of the Madonna and Child. They were so popular that they were referred to as "Mignardises." He also painted altarpieces. Compatriot Nicolas Poussin hired Mignard to make copies of his works. He was also active as a reproductive engraver making copies after Annibale Carracci. Mignard also developed his lifelong interest in portraiture at this time, and he painted portraits of subsequent popes, cardinals, and prominent members of the Italian nobility. He also travelled to Northern Italy where he visited Bologna, Parma, Mantua, Florence and Venice.

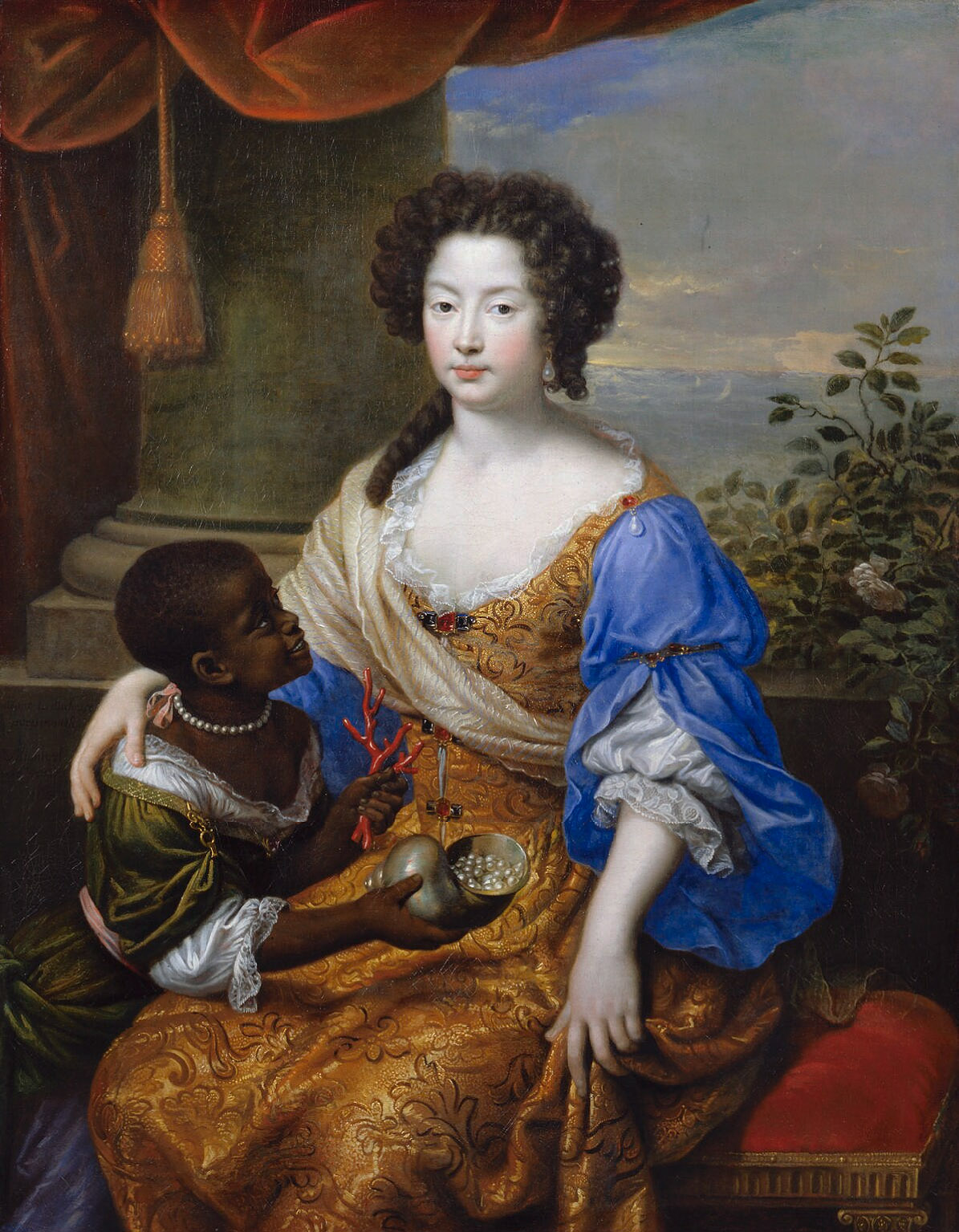
Portrait of Louise de Kérouaille, Duchess of Portsmouth

His reputation was such that he was summoned to Paris in 1657, probably by Cardinal Mazarin. He travelled back via Avignon where his brother Nicolas worked. Here he met the dramatist Molière, who became a close friend and of whom he painted several portraits. In Paris he became a popular portrait painter. He found favor with King Louis XIV who sat for many portraits. Mignard became a rival of the leading French painter of that time and first painter to the King, Charles Le Brun. He refused to enter the Académie royale de peinture et de sculpture while Le Brun was its director and instead became head of a rival guild. Following Le Brun's death in 1690, Mignard succeeded him as both director of the academy and premier peintre du Roi. His brother Nicolas and his nephew Paul, who was his pupil, had chosen the side of Le Brun against Mignard, which led to a break in their relationship. Mignard died five years later in 1695 in Paris as he was about to begin work on the cupola of Les Invalides.

== Work ==
Mignard was mainly active as a portrait painter. He also produced mythological and religious scenes.

Soon after his return to Paris, Mignard was able to attract the patronage of important personalities who commissioned portraits of him. His sitters included Turenne, Molière, Bossuet, Maintenon (in the Louvre), La Vallière, Sévigné, Montespan, Descartes (in Castle Howard). He was thus one of the most successful portrait painters of his time although according to some art historians also the most boring one.

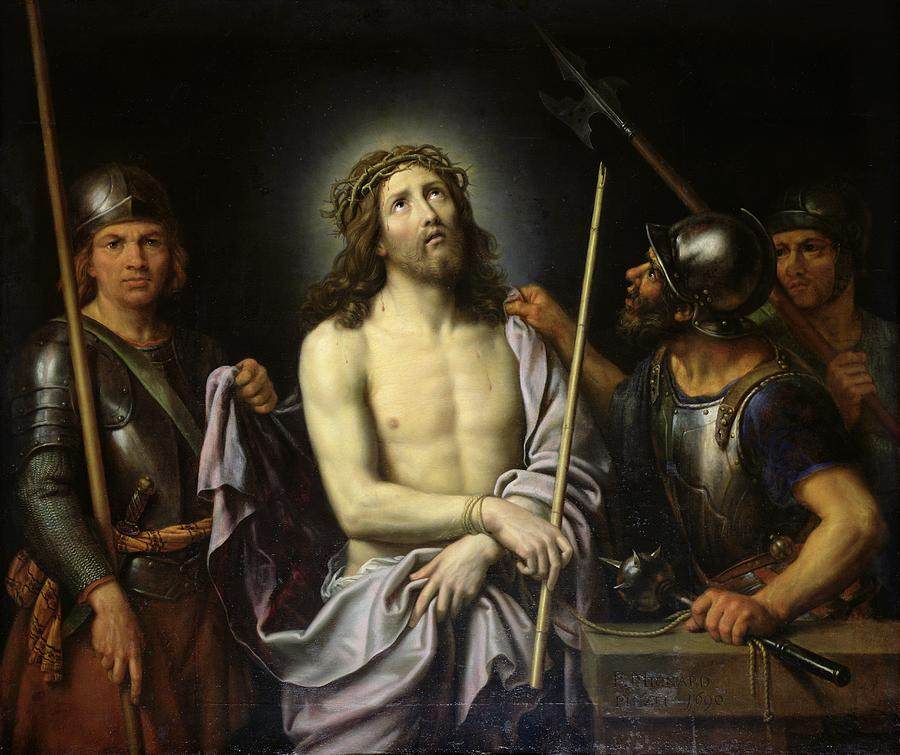
Ecce homo, 1690

Many of compositions were engraved by Gérard Audran, Pieter van Schuppen, Robert Nanteuil, Gérard Edelinck, Antoine Masson, François de Poilly and others.

There is a good selection of works by Pierre, Nicolas, and Pierre II in Avignon at the Musée Calvet. The Courtauld Institute of Art (London), Harvard University Art Museums, the Hermitage Museum, the Honolulu Museum of Art, Kunst Indeks Danmark, the Louvre, Musée d'Art et d'Histoire (Geneva), Musée des Augustins (Toulouse, France), Musée Ingres (Montauban, France), Museo Lombardi (Parma, Italy), the Museum of Fine Arts, Houston, the National Gallery, London, the National Portrait Gallery, London, the North Carolina Museum of Art, the Portland Art Museum and Versailles are among the public collections holding works by Pierre Mignard.

== See also ==
- French Baroque and Classicism
- List of paintings by Pierre Mignard
