= André Charlin =

French audio engineer and entrepreneur (1903–1983)

André Marie Bernard Charlin
- Born: 20 March 1903; Paris, France
- Died: 28 November 1983 (aged 80); Paris, France
- Occupation(s): Sound engineer, inventor

André Marie Bernard Charlin (20 March 1903 – 28 November 1983) was a French audio engineer and entrepreneur. He was a prolific inventor and filed many patents for radio amplifiers, movie sound recording equipment, and music recording. He founded and operated companies to make his equipment and to make the recordings.

== Early years (1903–30) ==
Charlin was born on 20 March 1903, in Paris. He was the second of four children of Georges Charlin (1869–1915) and Louise Rogonot (1879–1930). At age 13, he was a talented flutist. His father died that year and his uncle Edmond Ragonot, an electrical engineer, took an interest in the boy and helped him build his first radio receiver. Towards the end of World War I (1914–18) he built an amplifier, and in 1922 he filed his first patent for an electro-dynamic speaker diaphragm embedded in a screen. He sold the rights to this invention to the Compagnie Francaise Thomson-Houston in 1927. He completed his military service in 1926. That year he was granted patents for a push-pull electrostatic loudspeaker and for a variable reluctance pick-up system. He started a small business making radios and loudspeakers. Charlin married Madeleine Blanchard (1907–2006) on 7 October 1926. In the years that followed, Charlin was granted many patents for improvements to amplifiers.

== Movie equipment (1930–49) ==
Charlin became involved in cinematography at a time when sound was starting to be added to motion pictures, and began to build equipment for synchronous sound playback. At first this used 33 rpm records. The first "talkies" appeared in 1931, and Charlin began working on ways to improve sound quality through better recording technology. He founded a recording studio in 1933 that produced the sound tracks for many prewar movies, including in 1934 a stereo sound track for Abel Gance's 1927 silent movie Napoléon. He moved into techniques for film projection with a 1935 patent for "Cyclope" focussing and a 1938 patent for "Actua Colour" to project colour films which was used in over 1,000 movie theatres by 1948. During World War II, he turned to making dynamos to power the lamps of bicycles. In 1949, Charlin stopped producing cinema equipment and sold all his related patents to Philips of the Netherlands. In the early 1950s, Radio-Cinema, a subsidiary of the Compagnie générale de la télégraphie sans fil, acquired Charlin' company.

== Records (1949–83) ==
Charlin returned to recording music. In 1949, Charlin produced the first European microgroove vinyl record, L'Apothéose de Lully by François Couperin, conducted by Roger Désormière. Charlin developed a recording head in 1954 and a technique for stereo recording in 1958. He recorded many world famous artists, including twelve microgroove recordings of the famous Portuguese conductor Pedro de Freitas Branco. Most of the recordings were made at the Théâtre des Champs-Élysées in Paris with an orchestra assembled for the purpose. Two of them received the Grand Prix du Disque. In 1955, he recorded Pierre Cochereau playing Bach fugues on the organ of Notre-Dame de Paris. Charlin mistook Cochereau's mordents as wrong notes, and repeatedly stopped him. Perhaps as a result Cochereau played much more slowly than normal, and the recording was savagely attacked by the critics.

Charlin briefly collaborated with Michel Garcin in developing Erato Records, then after breaking with his partner in 1962 created his Centre d'Enregistrement des Champs Elysees (CECE) label with Carl de Nys. In 1963 and 1964, Charlin patented the Tete Charlin, a dummy head for commercial stereophonic records with two high-quality microphones from the Schoeps company. The term "dummy head" refers to the device's vague resemblance to a human head. During his career, Charlin filed at least 80 patents and received 118 Grand Prix du Disque. Charlin died in Paris on 28 November 1983.

== Sources ==
- André Charlin (in French), AudioFolia, archived from the original on 2016-03-03
- Borges de Azevedo, João (22 October 2012), "❛Enquête❜ Aux sources de la stéréophonie • L'ingénieur André Charlin et le chef d'orchestre portugais Pedro de Freitas Branco.", Appoggiature (in French)
- Brech, Martha; Paland, Ralph (2015), Kompositionen für hörbaren Raum / Compositions for Audible Space: Die frühe elektroakustische Musik und ihre Kontexte / The Early Electroacoustic Music and its Contexts, transcript Verlag, ISBN 978-3-8394-3076-7
- Chambost, Emmanuel de (2011), "A History of CAMECA (1954-2009)", in Peter W. Hawkes (ed.), Advances in Imaging and Electron Physics, Academic Press, ISBN 978-0-12-385985-3
- Edenholm, Anders; Svalander, Josef; Willigens, Jean-Marie, "André Charlin", André Charlin Homepage
- Hammond, Anthony (2012), Pierre Cochereau: Organist of Notre-Dame, University Rochester Press, ISBN 978-1-58046-405-5
- Pierfit, "André CHARLIN", geneanet (in French)
- R.L. (April 1984), "Charlin l'inventeur", HIFI Stereo (in French)
