= Pimpinone =

- Comic opera by Georg Philipp Telemann
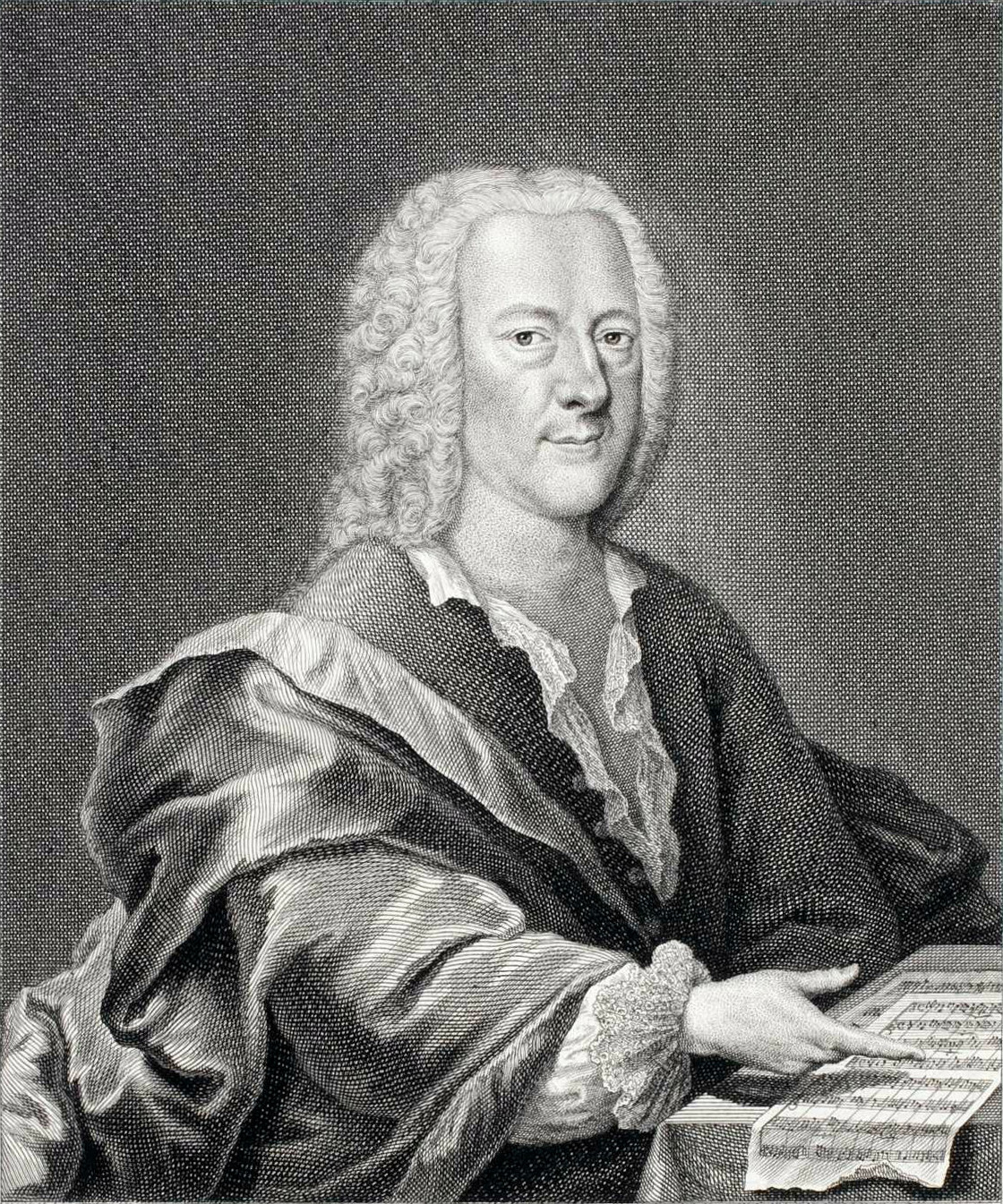
- The composer, c. 1745
- Translation: The Unequal Marriage Between Vespetta and Pimpinone or The Domineering Chambermaid
- Other title: Die Ungleiche Heirat zwischen Vespetta und Pimpinone oder Das herrsch-süchtige Camer Mägden
- Librettist: Johann Philipp Praetorius
- Language: German
- Premiere: 27 September 1725; Oper am Gänsemarkt, Hamburg

Pimpinone, TWV 21:15, is a comic opera by the German composer Georg Philipp Telemann with a libretto by Johann Philipp Praetorius. Its full title is Die Ungleiche Heirat zwischen Vespetta und Pimpinone oder Das herrsch-süchtige Camer Mägden (The Unequal Marriage Between Vespetta and Pimpinone or The Domineering Chambermaid). The work is described as a Lustiges Zwischenspiel ("comic intermezzo") in three parts. It was first performed at the Oper am Gänsemarkt in Hamburg on 27 September 1725 as light relief between the acts of Telemann's adaptation of Handel's opera seria Tamerlano. Pimpinone was highly successful and pointed the way forward to later intermezzi, particularly Giovanni Battista Pergolesi's La serva padrona.

== Roles ==
Roles, voice types, premier cast
Cast	Voice type	Premiere cast
Pimpinone	bass	Johann Gottfried Riemschneider
Vespetta	soprano	Margaretha Susanna Kayser

== Plot ==
Vespetta the chambermaid wheedles her way into marrying her employer, old Pimpinone. Once married she shows her waspish nature (the name Vespetta means "little wasp") and completely dominates her husband.

== Recordings ==
- Pimpinone, Mechthild Bach, Michael Schopper, La Stagione, conducted by Michael Schneider (Deutsche Harmonia Mundi, 1993)
- Pimpinone oder Die ungleiche Heirat, Erna Roscher, Reiner Süß, Staatskapelle Berlin, conducted by Helmut Koch (Berlin Classics)
- Pimpinone, Yvonne Ciannella, Erich Wenk, Bach-Collegium Stuttgart, conducted by Helmuth Rilling (Turnabout TV 34124S stereo, 1967)

== Sources ==
- The Viking Opera Guide ed. Amanda Holden (Viking, 1993)
- Magazine de l'opéra baroque (in French)
