= Te Deum (Charpentier) =

1680s-90s composition by Marc-Antoine Charpentier

- by Marc-Antoine Charpentier
- Key: D major
- Catalogue: H.146
- Text: Te Deum
- Language: Latin
- Composed: 1692
- Scoring: soloists; choir; orchestra

Marc-Antoine Charpentier composed six Te Deum settings, but only four of them have survived (H.145, H.146, H.147, H.148).

Largely because of the great popularity of its prelude, the best known is the Te Deum in D major, H.146, written as a grand motet for soloists, choir, and instrumental accompaniment probably between 1688 and 1698, during Charpentier's stay at the Jesuit Church of Saint-Louis in Paris, where he held the position of musical director.

It is thought that the composition was performed to mark the victory celebrations and the Battle of Steinkirk in August, 1692.

The piece is best known for having its prelude serve as the theme music preceding the Eurovision network broadcasts, including most notably the Eurovision Song Contest.

== Structure ==
The composition consists of the following parts:

Prelude
- Prelude (Marche en rondeau)
- Te Deum laudamus (bass solo)
- Te aeternum Patrem (chorus and SSAT solo)
- Pleni sunt caeli et terra (chorus)
- Te per orbem terrarum (trio, ATB)
- Tu devicto mortis aculeo (chorus, bass solo)
- Te ergo quaesumus (soprano solo)
- Aeterna fac cum sanctis tuis (chorus)
- Dignare, Domine (duo, SB)
- Fiat misericordia tua (trio, SSB)
- In te, Domine, speravi (chorus with ATB trio)

Charpentier considered the key D major as "bright and very warlike"; indeed D major was regarded as the "key of glory" in Baroque music. The instrumental introduction, composed in the form of rondo, precedes the first verset, led by the bass soloist. The choir and other soloists join gradually. Charpentier apparently intended to orchestrate the work according to the traditional exegesis of the Latin text. The choir thus predominates in the first part (verset 1–10, praise of God, heavenly dimension), and individual soloists in the second part (verset 11–20, Christological section, secular dimension). In subsequent versets, nos. 21–25, both soloists and choir alternate, and the final verset is a large-scale fugue written for choir, with a short trio for soloists in the middle.

== Orchestration ==
The composition is scored for choir (SATB) and 5 soloists (SSATB), accompanied with an instrumental ensemble of 2 alto recorders, 2 oboes, trumpet, low trumpet and timpani (playing the same part), 2 violins, 2 violas ("haute-contres de violon" and "tailles de violon") and basso continuo. The bass part is marked "orgue et [basse de] vi[ol]ons et bassons" ("organ and bass violins and bassoons") in the holograph manuscript.

The orchestral tutti are mostly restricted to 4 parts (all high wind instruments and violins playing the same line), while the vocal soloist sections make use of a lighter three-part instrumental texture including 2 recorders and basso continuo as well as 2 violins and basso continuo.

== Cultural legacy ==
Prelude, arranged as an organ solo

After the work's rediscovery in 1953 by French musicologist Carl de Nys, the instrumental prelude, Marche en rondeau, was chosen in 1954 as the theme music preceding the Eurovision network broadcasts of the European Broadcasting Union, including most notably the Eurovision Song Contest. This version was arranged by Guy Lambert and directed by Louis Martini.
