= List of paintings by Pierre Mignard =

This is an incomplete list of paintings by the French artist Pierre Mignard.

| Image | Title | Year | Technique | Dimensions (cm) | Gallery | Note |
|---|---|---|---|---|---|---|
| | The Presentation of the Virgin in the Temple | c.1635 | Oil on canvas | 119 × 165 | Private collection | |
| | The Death of Cleopatra | c.1635 | Oil on canvas | 97.8 × 134 | National trust collection | |
| | Godefroy de Bouillon treated by an angel | c.1640 | Oil on canvas | 240 × 302 | Musée du Pays de Hanau, Bouxwiller, Bas-Rhin | |
| | The Virgin of the grapes | 1640-1650 | Oil on panel | 94 × 121 | Musée du Louvre, Paris | |
| | Euterpe and Clio | 1646 | oil on canvas | 178 × 133 | Palace of Fontainebleau | |
| | The Children of the Duc de Bouillon | 1647 | oil on canvas | 89.9 × 118.7 | Honolulu Museum of Art | |
| | The Holy Family with Saint John the Baptist in a Classical Landscape | c.1650 | oil on canvas | | Private collection | |
| | Henrietta of England (1644–1670) | 1650-1675 | Oil on canvas | 79 × 63 | Palace of Versailles | |
| | Henri de Forbin-Maynier, baron d'Oppède | 1657 | Oil on canvas | 122.5 × 100 | Fondation Calvet | |
| | Molière | c.1658 | Oil on canvas | 48.5 × 55 | Musée Condé, Chantilly, Oise | |
| | Alexander meets the queen of the Amazons | c.1660 | Oil on canvas | 248 × 249 | Fondation Calvet, Avignon | |
| | Marie Mancini | c.1660 | Oil on canvas | | Collection particulière de Georges de Lastic | |
| | Anne of Austria | c.1660 | Oil on canvas | 55 × 50 | National Museum in Warsaw | |
| | The Duchess of Orléans | c.1664 | Oil on panel | 74 × 59 | Musée Condé, Chantilly, Oise | |
| | God the Father | c. 1664 | Oil on canvas | 46.5 × 60.3 | National Gallery of Art | |
| | Portrait of Henrietta of England | 1665-1670 | Oil on canvas | 62.2 × 78.7 | National Portrait Gallery, London | |
| | Mystic Marriage of St Catherine | 1669 | Oil on canvas | 134 × 105 | Hermitage Museum | |
| | Self-Portrait | 1670-1690 | Oil on canvas | 188 × 235 | Musée du Louvre, Paris | |
| | Isabelle d'Orléans, Duchess of Guise with her son | 1672 | Oil on canvas | | Château de Blois | |
| | Girl Blowing Soap Bubbles | 1674 | Oil on canvas | 132 × 96 | Palace of Versailles | |
| | Jacques-Bénigne Bossuet | 1675 | Oil | | Musée Bossuet | |
| | Liselotte, Duchess of Orléans | 1675 | Oil on canvas | | Kurpfälzisches Museum | |
| | Portrait of Marie Louise d'Orléans (1662-1689) | 1679 | Oil on canvas | | Unidentified location | |
| | Andromeda and Perseus | 1679 | Oil on canvas | 150 × 198 | Musée du Louvre, Paris | |
| | Portrait of Louis de Bourbon, Comte de Vermandois (1667–1683) in armour with the royal coat-of-arms on the shoulder, a lace neckerchief and pink bow | 1680 | Oil on canvas | 60.4 x 50.8 | Palace of Versailles | |
| | Young lady | 1680 | Oil on canvas | | | |
| | Portrait Study of a Woman | 1680 | Oil on canvas | | Private collection | |
| | Portrait of Louise de Kérouaille, Duchess of Portsmouth | 1682 | Oil on canvas | 120,7 × 95,3 | National Portrait Gallery, London | |
| | Jesus on the road to Calvary | 1684 | engraving | 150 × 198 | Musée du Louvre, Paris | |
| | Family of Louis of France, Grand Dauphin | 1687 | oil on canvas | 232 × 304 | Palace of Versailles | |
| | Neptune offering his wealth to France | 1687 | oil on canvas | 138 × 163.5 | Château de Compiègne | |
| | Saint John the Baptist | 1688 | oil on canvas | 109 × 147 | Museo del Prado, Madrid | |
| | Clio | 1689 | oil on canvas | | Museum of Fine Arts (Budapest) | |
| | Ecce homo | 1690 | oil on canvas | 138 × 163.5 | Musée des beaux-arts de Rouen | |
| | Christ and the woman of Samaria | c.1691 | oil on canvas | 370 × 480 | Musée du Louvre, Paris | |
| | Louis XIV à cheval couronné par la Victoire | 1692 | oil on canvas | 260 × 359 | Palace of Versailles | |
| | Fortune and Abundance and Liberality | 1692 | oil on canvas | 152 × 204 | Palais des Beaux-Arts de Lille | |
| | Time Clipping Cupid's Wings | 1694 | Oil on canvas | 66.04 × 53.97 | Denver Art Museum | |
| | Françoise d'Aubigné, marquise de Maintenon | 1694 | oil on canvas | 128 × 97 | Palace of Versailles | |
| | Portrait of Olympia Mancini (1638–1708), comtess of Soissons depicted as Athena | 1695 | oil on canvas | 130 × 99 | Nationalmuseum | |
| | Lady in the Park | 17th century | oil on panel | 42 × 52 | Private collection | |
| | Philippe de France vêtu à la romaine et dirigeant une charge de cavalerie | 17th century | oil on canvas | | Palace of Versailles | |
| | Calliope, Urania and Terpsichore | 17th century | oil on canvas | 133 × 178 | Palace of Fontainebleau | |
| | The Suicide of Porcia | 17th century | oil on canvas | | Musée des Beaux-Arts de Rennes | |
| | The young Louis XIV with his brother Philippe and his governess madame Lansac | 17th century | oil on canvas | 250 × 196 | Palace of Versailles | |
| | Henri de La Tour d'Auvergne, Vicomte de Turenne | 17th century | oil on canvas | 95 × 126 | Private Collection | |
| | Edouard Colbert, Marquis de Villacerf | 17th century | oil on canvas | 82.5 x 66 | Private collection | |
| | Portrait of Louis François Marie Le Tellier, Marquis de Barbezieux, Secrétaire d'État à la Guerre (1668–1701) | 17th century | oil on canvas | 127.3 x 102 | William Doyle Gallery | |
| | La Duchesse de la Vallière | 17th century | oil on canvas | | | |
