= Johann Friedrich Klöffler =

Johann Friedrich Kloffler
- Born: 20 April 1725
- Died: 21 February 1790 (aged 64)
- Occupation: German composer

Johann Friedrich Klöffler (20 April 1725 – 21 February 1790) was a German conductor, composer, and administrator. He was one of the earliest to write music for two orchestras.

From 1750 to 1789 he worked at Steinfurt, occasionally touring throughout Europe and Russia. For the Steinfurt castle concert hall, he wrote many symphonies, some of which include horns with crook changes. The vast majority of Klöffler's chamber music is for flute.
