= Antonio Lolli =

Italian violinist and composer

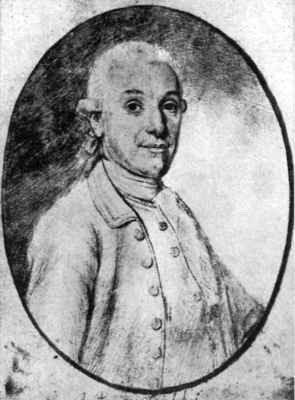

Antonio Lolli (c. 1725 – 10 August 1802) was an Italian violinist and composer.

== Life ==
Lolli, who was born about 1725 in Bergamo, Italy, was one of the foremost Italian violinists of the 18th century. Between 1758 and 1774, he was solo violinist at the Stuttgart court orchestra, a position that enabled him to undertake extensive concert tours through Germany and to Vienna, Paris, the Netherlands and Italy. Tsarina Catherine II of Russia invited him to a position in St. Petersburg, where he remained from 1774 to 1783. A violin bow presented by Catherine II to the composer still exists. Finding the Russian climate too harsh, Lolli left St. Petersburg and spent a number of years touring much of Europe, including Germany, Poland, Scandinavia, and France. In 1794, he became maestro di capella at the royal court in Naples.

Lolli died in Palermo, Sicily in 1802.

His son, Filippo Lolli (born 1773 in Stuttgart, died unknown), earned renown as a cellist.

== Works ==
Lolli published eight violin concertos, of which the concerto No.7 in G major was the most successful. Other works include six sonatas (duets) Op.9 for two violins (1785), three collections of six sonatas each for violin and basso continuo (1760, 1767, 1769), and 36 capriccios for solo violin, as well as the didactic L'école du violon en quatuor (1784).
