= Nicolas Mignard =

French painter (1606–1668)

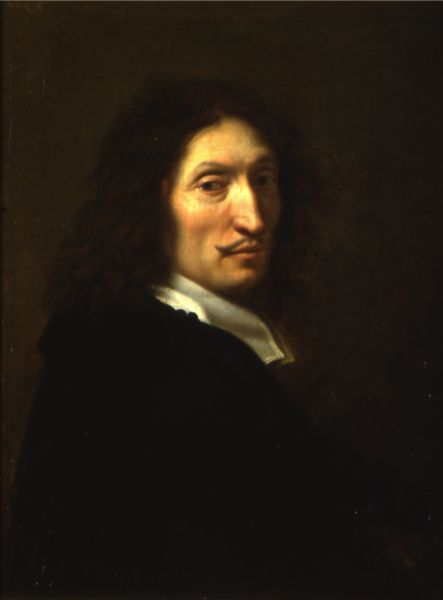
- Self-portrait, Calvet Museum
- Born: 7 February 1606 (Note: Date of baptism.); Troyes, Aube, France
- Died: 20 March 1668 (aged 62); Paris, France
- Other name: Mignard d’Avignon
- Occupation: Painter
- Spouse: Marguerite d'Avril
- Children: 2, including Paul and Pierre II
- Family: Pierre Mignard (brother)

Nicolas Mignard (French pronunciation: [nikɔla miɲaʁ]), also known as Mignard d'Avignon, (7 February 1606 (baptised) – 20 March 1668) was a French painter known for his religious and mythological scenes and portraits. He spent most of his active life in Avignon creating religious and mythological paintings for religious institutions and stately homes but ended his career as court painter in Paris.

== Biography ==
Nicolas Mignard was born in Troyes in 1606 as the son of Pierre and Marie Gallois. He came from a family of artisans. He was the older brother of Pierre Mignard, who became one of the leading French painters of the 17th century and a rival of Charles Le Brun.

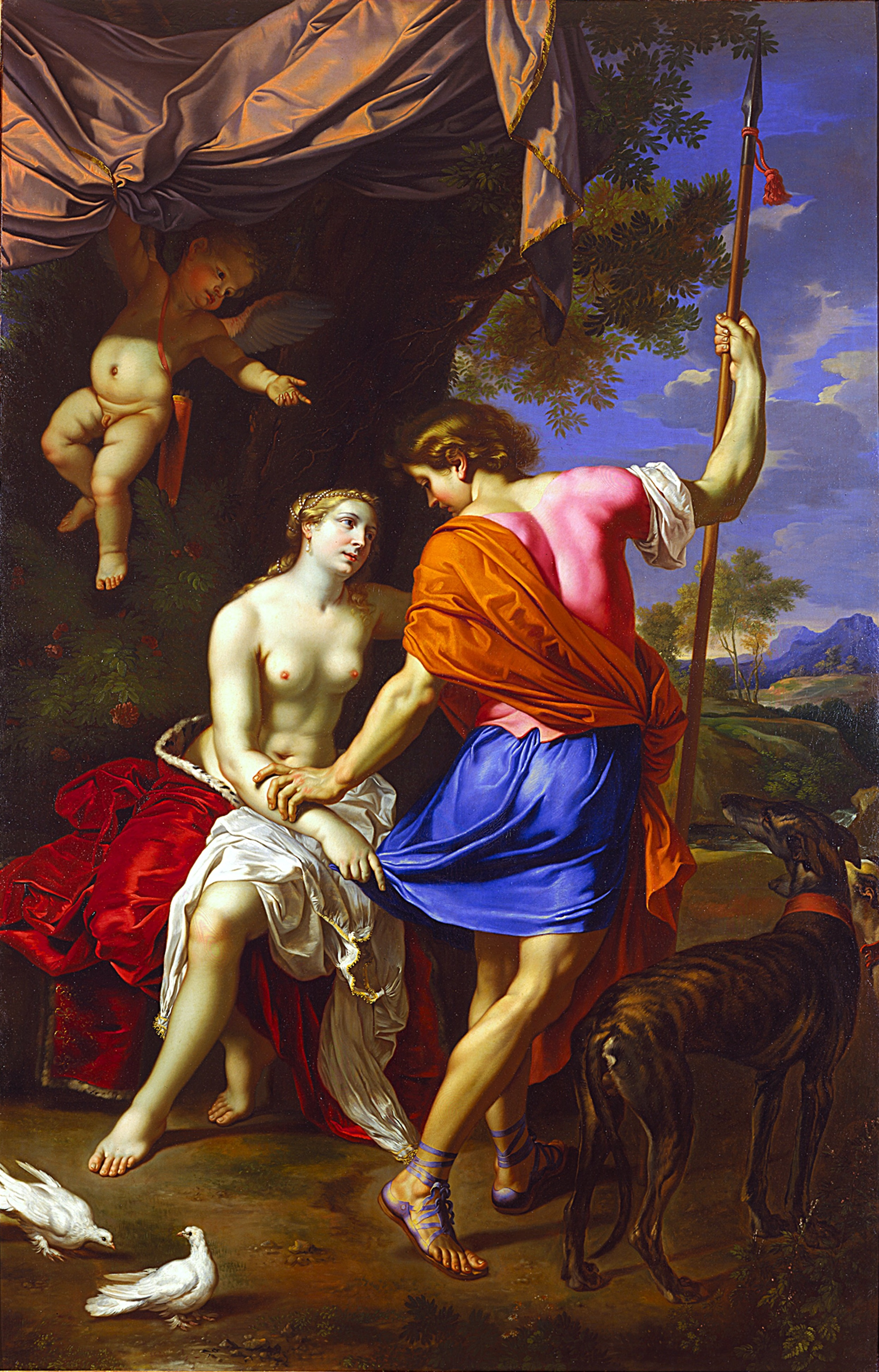
Venus and Adonis, c. 1650

Nicolas Mignard studied painting with a local master of Troyes whose identity is unknown. He travelled subsequently to Fontainebleau where he copied the works of the Mannerist painters. He likely also spent time in Paris where he is believed to have studied with Simon Vouet. Mignard then spent some time in Lyon before moving to Avignon around 1633.

He then traveled to Rome in the retinue of Alphonse-Louis du Plessis, the Cardinal Archbishop of Lyon and brother of Cardinal Richelieu. Mignard came back to Avignon in 1636, after having executed several series of etchings in Rome, principally after the works of Annibale Carracci. In Avignon he mostly painted for religious institutions as well as decorations for opulent residences. He married Marguerite d'Avril. Their son Paul Mignard became a painter and etcher and their son Pierre II Mignard a painter and architect.

When King Louis XIV and his Court visited Avignon on their way to the King's wedding with Maria Theresa of Spain, Mignard was commissioned to paint portraits of various courtiers including Cardinal Mazarin. Mazarin ordered Mignard by lettre de cachet to come to Paris in 1660. Mignard joined the Académie royale de peinture et de sculpture in 1663 without having to submit an admission piece. He became Professor and Assistant Rector of the Académie in 1664 and Rector in 1666. He was a supporter of Charles Le Brun in his conflict with his own brother Pierre. He and later his son Paul would be on poor terms with Pierre over this conflict of Pierre with Le Brun.

Nicolas Mignard died on 20 March 1668 in Paris.

== Work ==
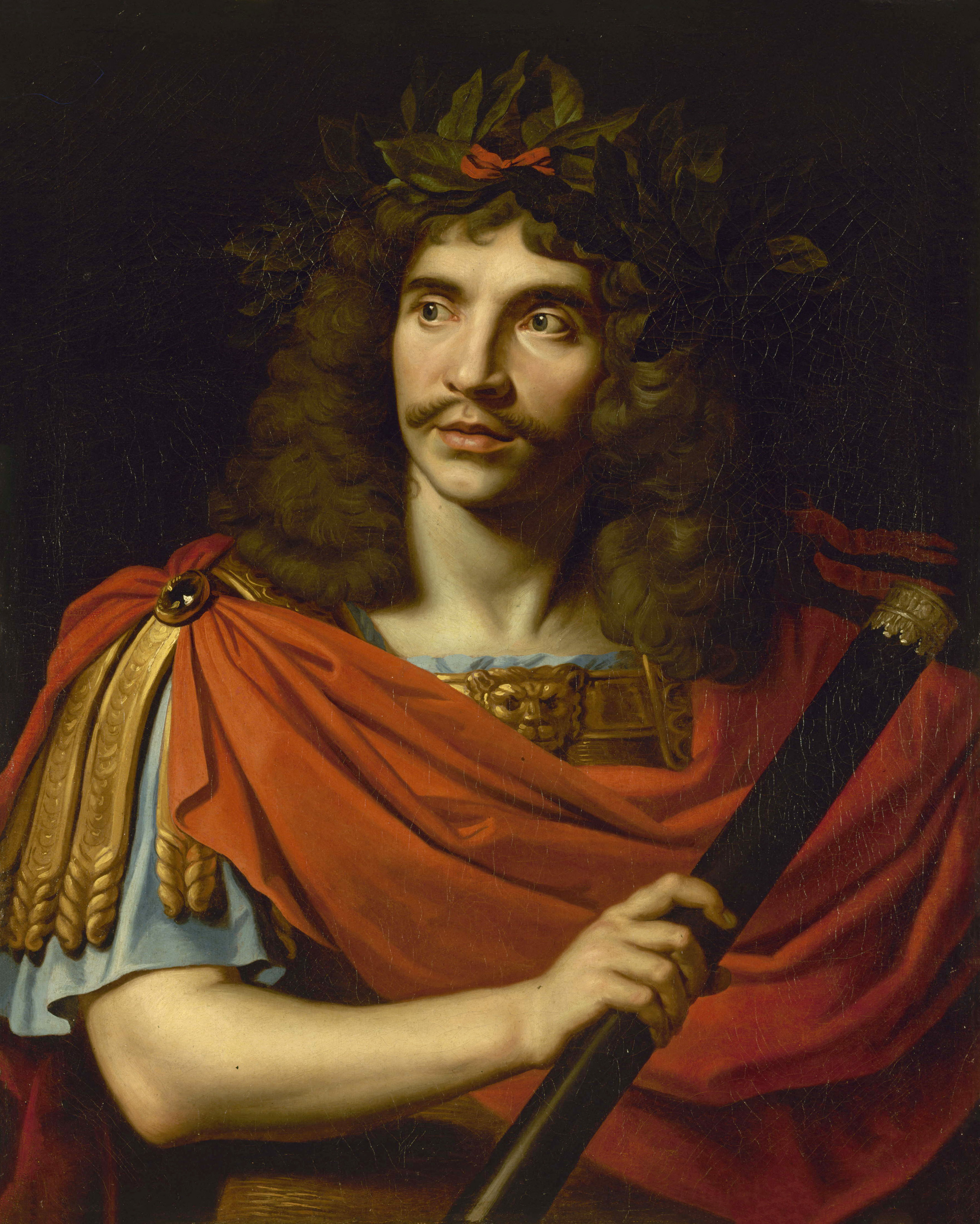
Molière in the role of Julius Caesar, 1656

Mignard painted history scenes as well as portraits. As he spent most of his life in Avignon he was somewhat overshadowed by his younger brother Pierre, who had made a career in Paris. After his death, paintings by Nicolas Mignard mostly stayed in Avignon or in small cities around Avignon. During the French Revolution, many paintings were expropriated from their owners. Many of the works of Nicolas that were thus confiscated were subsequently erroneously attributed to his brother Pierre.

His earliest work showed the influence of the Mannerists working in Fontainebleau and of Carracci. Later his style followed the Italianate classicizing aesthetic that dominated seventeenth-century France, and was very much influenced by the French classical Baroque painter Charles Le Brun.
