= Pierre II Mignard =

French architect and painter

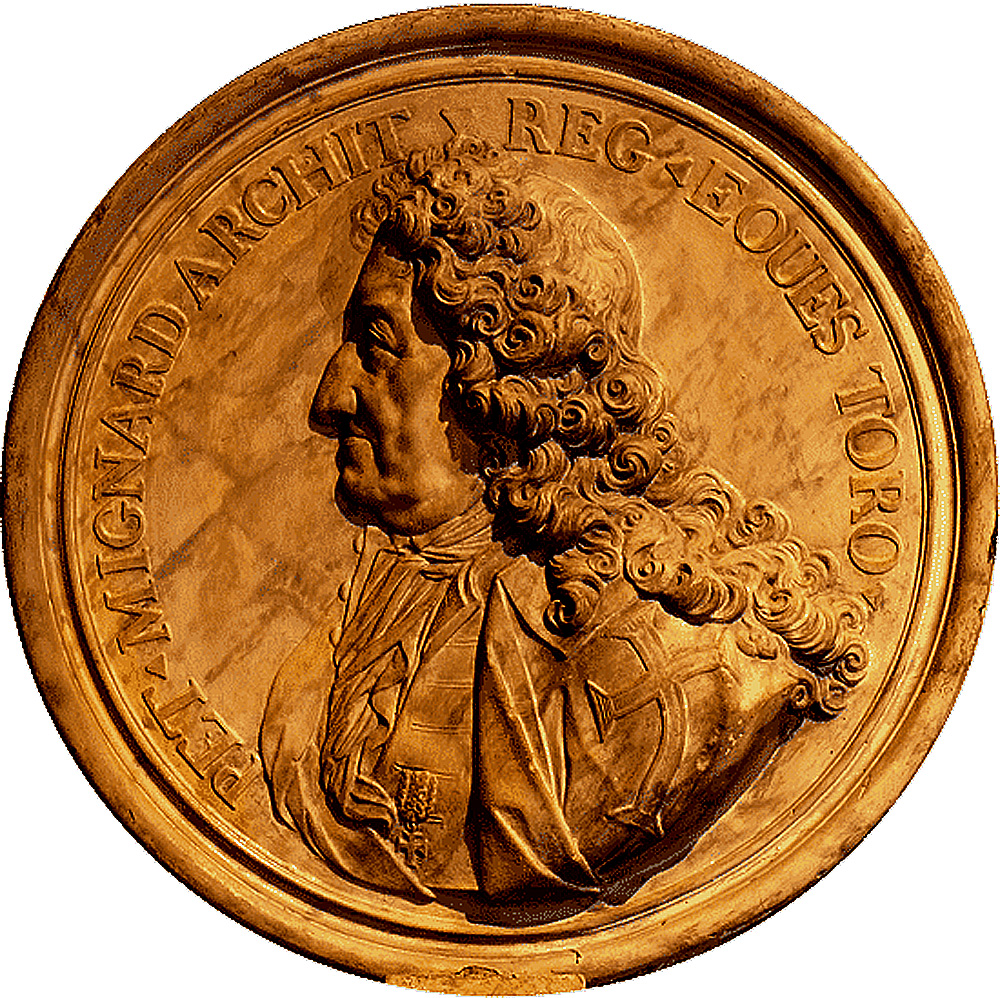
- Medalion of Pierre II Mignard on his tomb in Collégiale Saint-Agricol d'Avignon.
- Born: 20 February 1640; Avignon, Papal States
- Died: 10 April 1725 (aged 85); Avignon, Papal States
- Occupation(s): Architect, painter
- Father: Nicolas Mignard
- Family: Paul Mignard (brother)

Pierre II Mignard (20 February 1640 – 10 April 1725) was an architect and painter. He was the son of painter Nicolas Mignard and the younger brother of Paul Mignard, a portrait painter.

== Biography ==
Pierre II Mignard was born and died in Avignon.

In 1671, he became one of the first eight members of the Académie royale d'architecture created by Louis XIV.

== Gallery ==
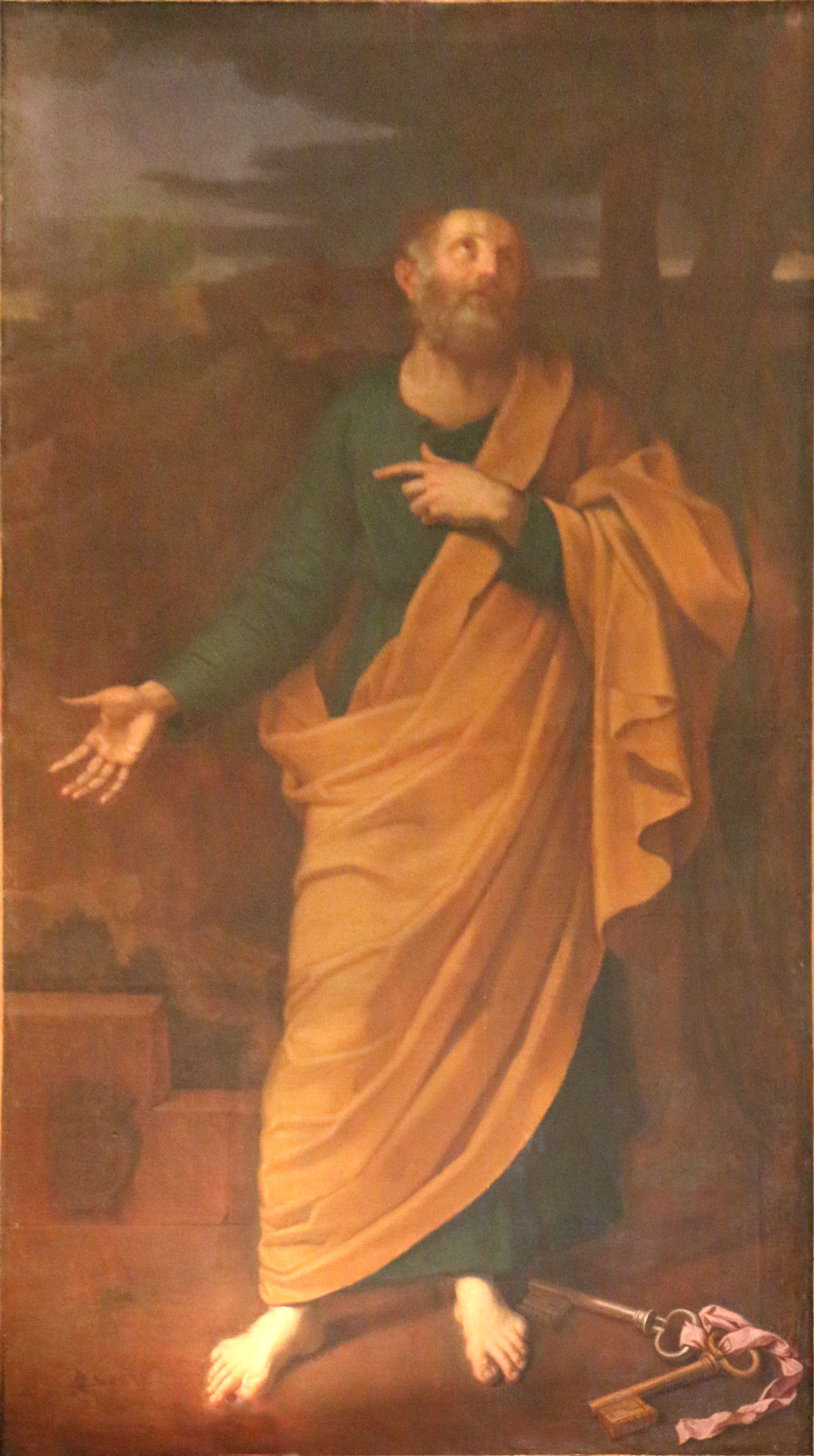
Saint Pierre

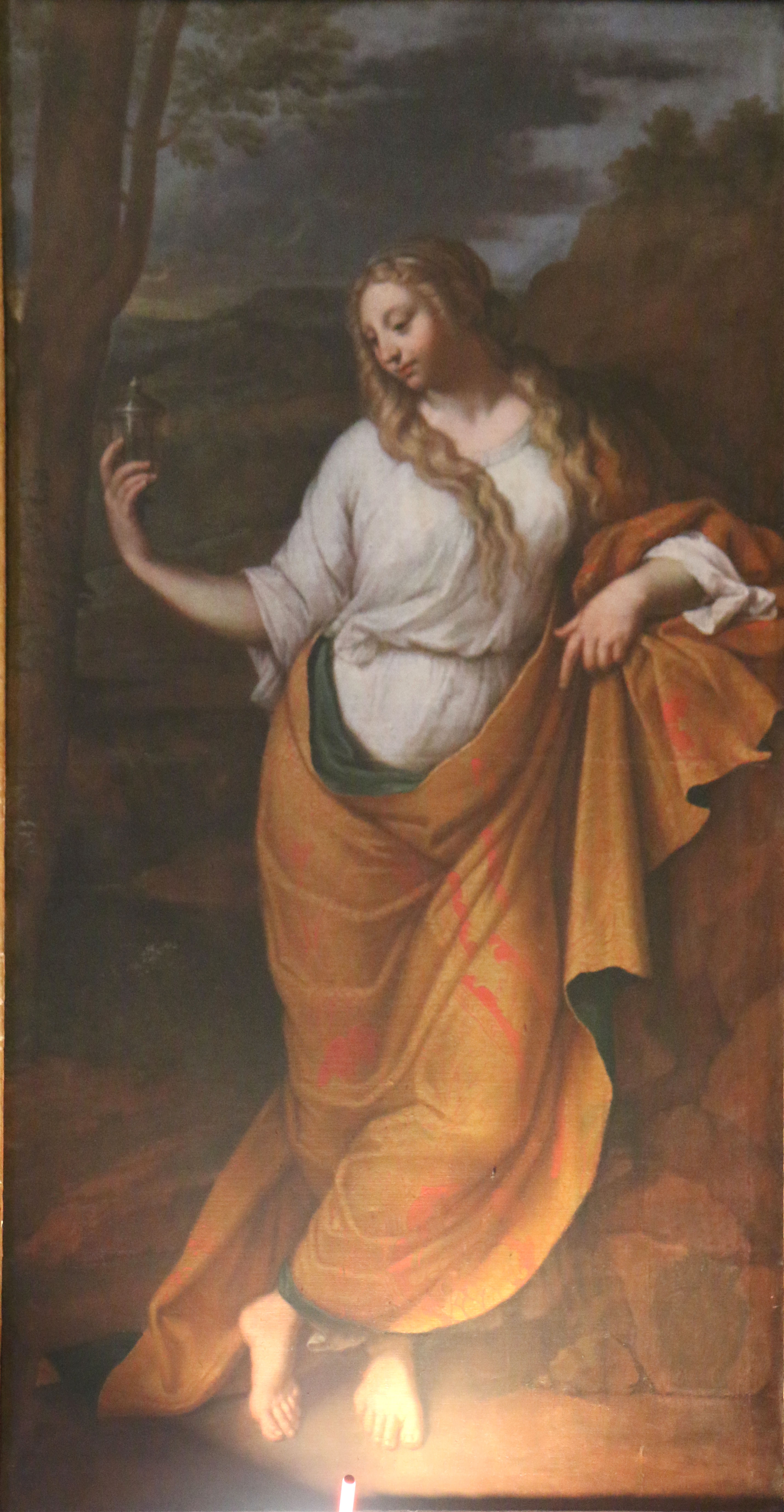
Marie Madeleine

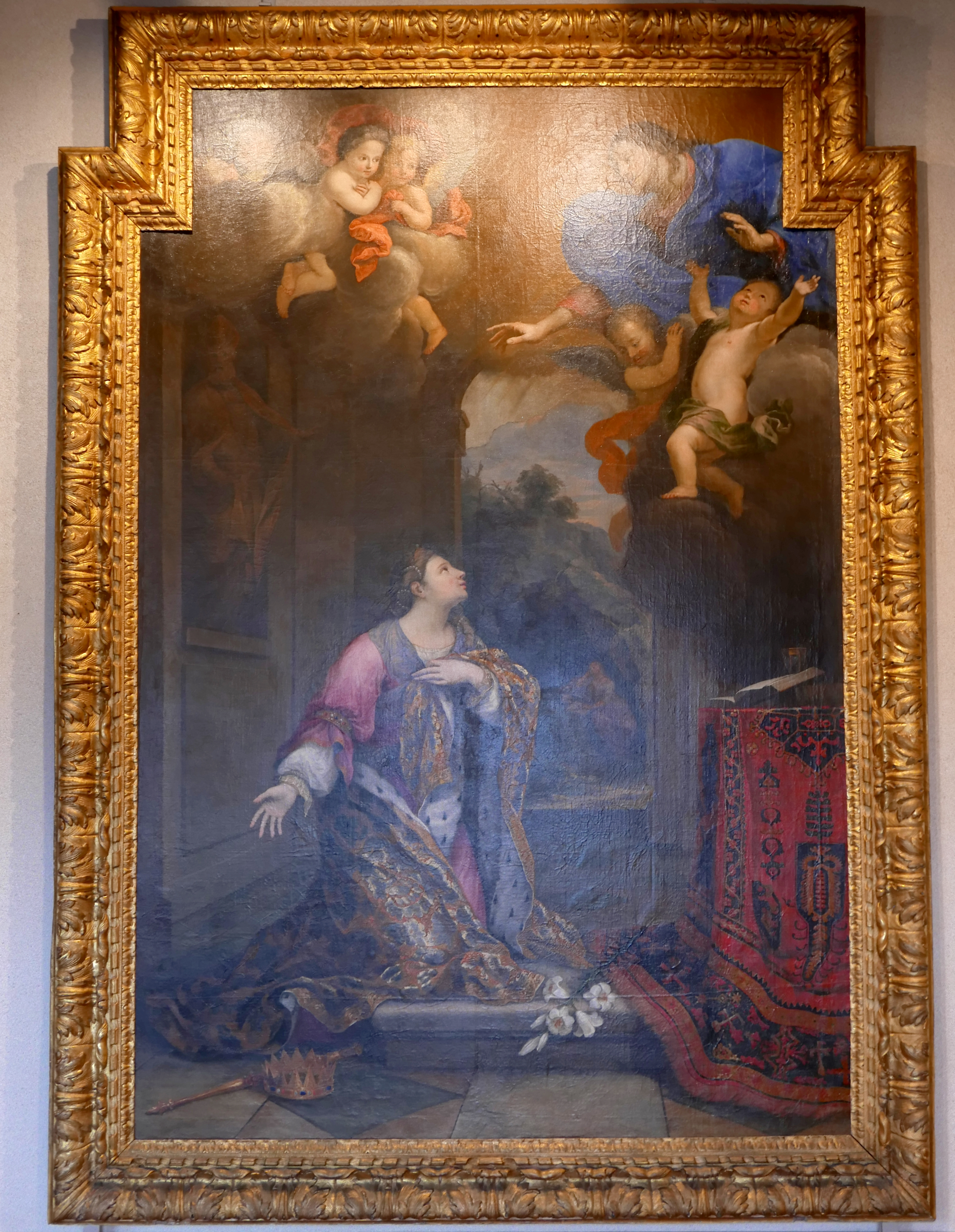
Saint Casarie

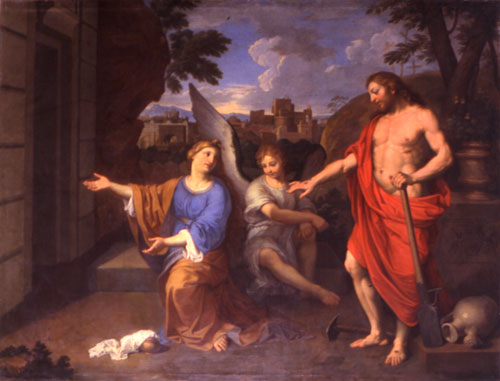
Noli me tangere (1711)

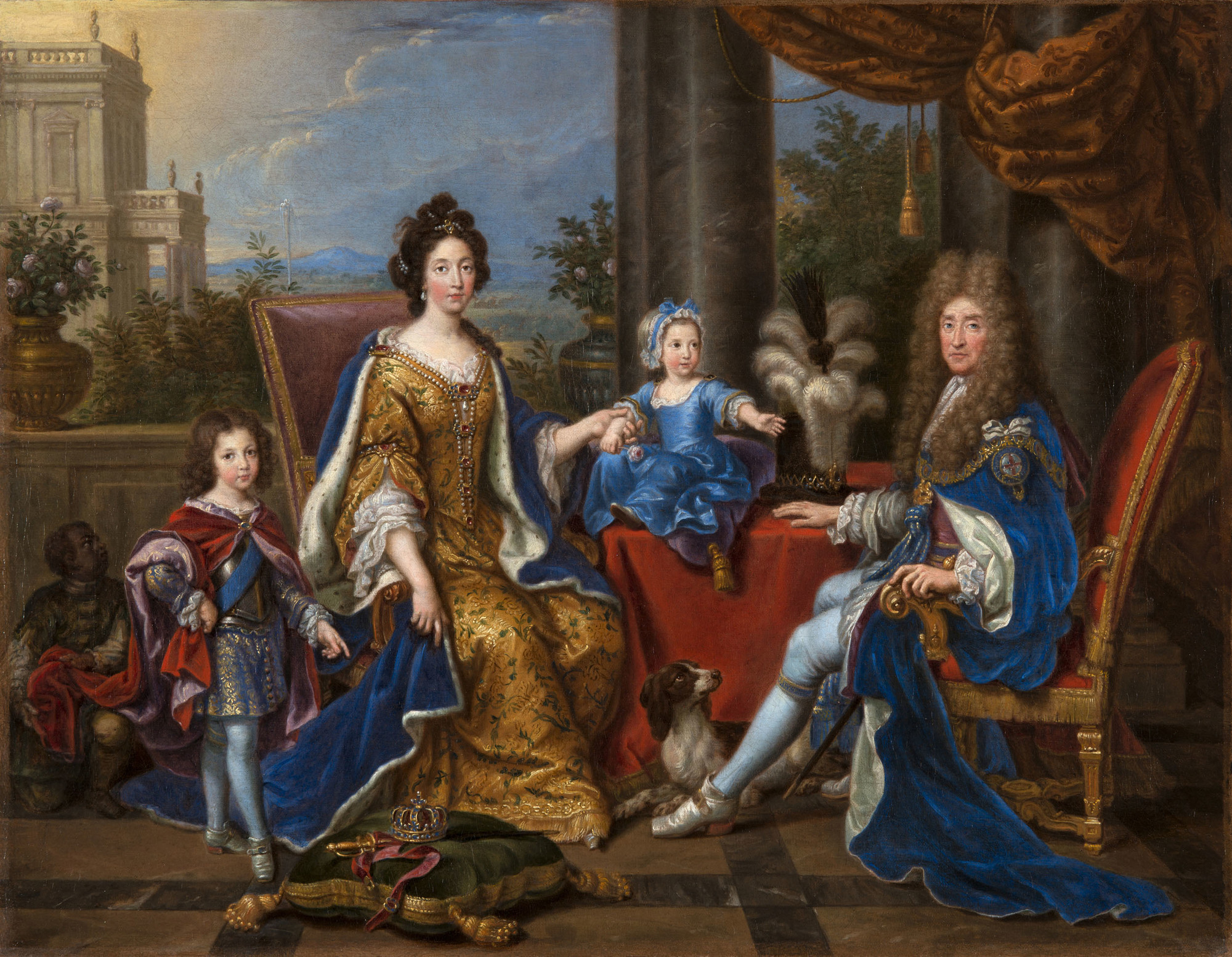
James II and Family (1694)
