= Paul Mignard =

French painter (1639–1691)

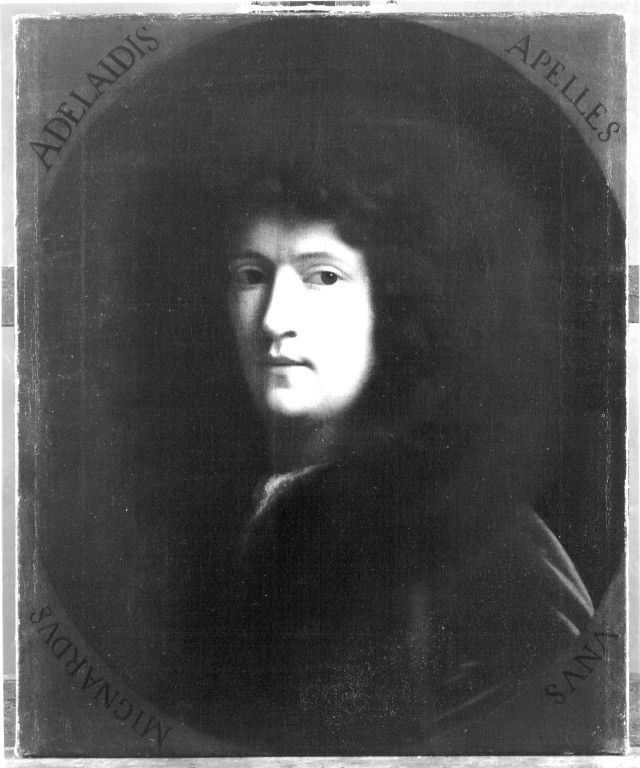
- Self-portrait, 1673/74
- Born: 27 December 1639; Avignon, Papal States
- Died: 15 October 1691 (aged 51); Lyon, France
- Education: Académie royale de peinture et de sculpture
- Occupations: Painter, etcher
- Spouse: Marie-Madeleine Chenard
- Father: Nicolas Mignard
- Family: Pierre II Mignard (brother); Pierre Mignard (uncle)

Paul Mignard (27 December 1639, in Avignon – 15 October 1691, in Lyon) was a French painter and etcher. Born into an important artistic family with its origins in Troyes, he is known mainly as a portrait painter.

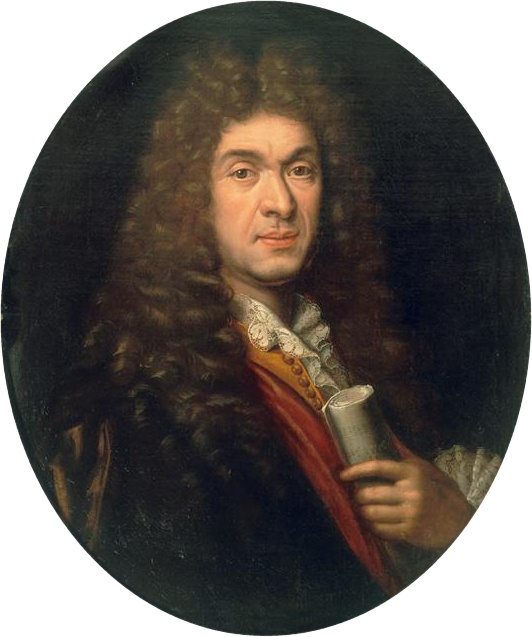
Portrait of Jean-Baptiste Lully

== Life ==
Paul Mignard was born in Avignon on 27 December 1639. He was the son of Nicolas Mignard and Marguerite d'Avril. His family included a number of artists. His father and uncle Pierre Mignard were prominent history and portrait painters. His younger brother Pierre became an architect and painter.

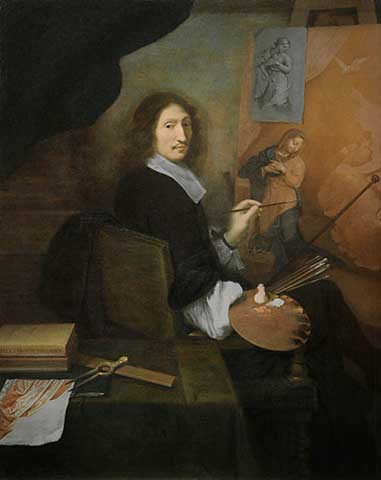
Portrait of Nicolas Mignard, painting an Annunciation

Paul Mignard was a pupil of his uncle Pierre Mignard. He was received into the Académie royale de peinture et de sculpture on 11 June 1672. The work that earned him admission to the Académie was a large Portrait of Nicolas Mignard, painting an Annunciation (Museum of Fine Arts of Lyon). It shows his father sitting in his studio in front of a painting he is working on and holding his palette and brushes. On a table placed next to his father is a copy of the Architettura di Palladio, together with a ruler and compasses.

It is known that Mignard spent time in Italy in the 1670s but little is known about his stay. He also was in England painting portraits. He was active in Bavaria as court painter to the family of the Elector. He painted several portraits of the Elector and his wife, who held him in high esteem. He dedicated his self-portrait (Alte Pinakothek, Munchen) to Henriette Adelaide of Savoy.

He married Marie-Madeleine Chenard. The couple had a few children. On 7 September 1690, Mignard was appointed ordinary painter of the city of Lyons. This appointment required him to paint portraits of city officials.

Paul Mignard died on 15 October 1691 in Lyon.

== Work ==
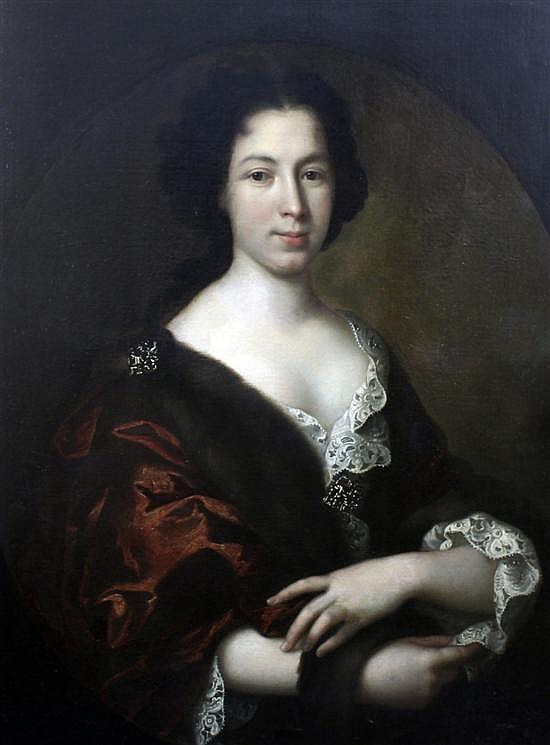
Portrait of Mrs Peter Beesley

Paul Mignard painted mainly portraits. He had learned from his uncle Pierre the art of court portrait painting, characterised by its emphasis on elegant poses and elaborately worked out details of lavish costumes. The works stressed the high status of the sitters and the affluence of their entourage.

As father and son Mignard painted in a style, which was not very different, the portrait of Jean-Baptiste Lully has often been attributed to the father. However, the inscription on the print that was engraved after this portrait by Jean-Louis Roullet in 1687 clearly states that it was Paul Mignard, the son of Nicolas Mignard, who painted it. Paul Mignard was also connected to a series of portraits of beauties executed for the Duke of Savoy in the mid 1670s.

On 2 January 1683 Paul Mignard presented the Académie with his 'Ode à Mr Le Brun pemier peintre du Roy' (Paris, published at Pierre Le Petit, 1683). In this publication Mignard sang the praises of the art of the leading French painter of the 17th century, Charles Le Brun, who was a friend of his father but a rival of his uncle. Not long before the Ode was published, Paul’s uncle Pierre and Le Brun had engaged in a bitter exchange of accusations. Paul Mignard took the side of Le Brun against his uncle and the Ode was his manner of expressing his support for Le Brun. The Ode is considered to be an awful example of sycophancy.
