= 1720 in music =

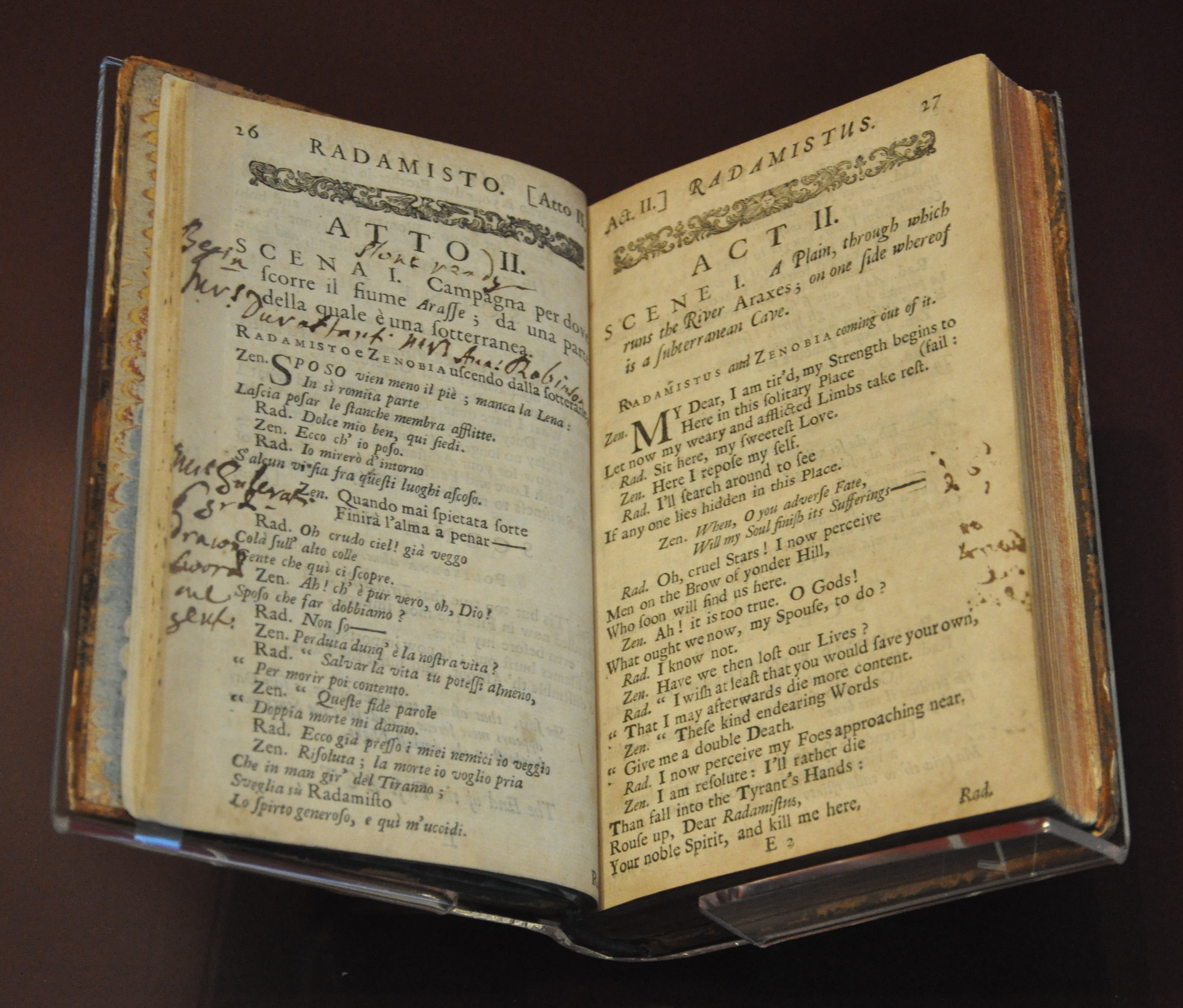
Prompt book for Handel's Radamisto

This article lists the most significant events and works of the year 1720 in music.

== Events ==
- April – The Royal Academy of Music, a company formed for Handel in London, begins to produce operas.
- Giovanni Bononcini arrives in London, his home until 1732, and becomes one of Handel's most notable rivals.
- Benedetto Marcello's satirical attack on opera, Il teatro alla moda, is published anonymously in Venice.
- Domenico Scarlatti arrives in Lisbon.

== Publications ==
- Jan Josef Ignác Brentner – Horae Pomeridianae
- George Frideric Handel - Suite de Pièces pour le clavecin, a work including the famous set of variations known as The Harmonious Blacksmith.
- Marin Marais – Sonnerie de Ste-Geneviève du Mont-de-Paris
- James Paisible – Six setts of aires for two flutes & a bass...
- Alessandro Scarlatti – Messa di Santa Cecilia

== Classical music ==
- Johann Sebastian Bach
  - Prelude for Lute in C minor
  - Sonatas and Partitas for Solo Violin

== Opera ==
- Antonio Maria Bononcini – Nino
- George Frideric Handel – Radamisto
- Johann David Heinichen – Flavio Crispo
- Leonardo Leo – Caio Gracco
- Giovanni Porta – Numitore
- Antonio Vivaldi – La verità in cimento

== Births ==
- January 1 – Johann Christoph Altnickol, composer (baptized January 1, 1720)
- January 4 – Johann Friedrich Agricola, composer (died 1774)
- August 20 – Bernard de Bury, court musician and composer (died 1785)
- October 17 – Maria Teresa Agnesi, singer and composer (died 1795)
- November 16 – Carlo Antonio Campioni, composer (died 1788)
- date unknown
  - Henry Hargrave, composer (died 1780)
  - William Savage, singer, organist and composer (died 1789)
- probable
  - Gioacchino Cocchi, composer (died 1804)
  - Bernhard Joachim Hagen, composer (died 1787)
  - Joan Baptista Pla, oboist and composer (died 1773)
  - Johann Georg Schürer, composer (died 1786)

== Deaths ==
- July 7 – Maria Barbara Bach, first wife of Johann Sebastian Bach (born 1684)
- July 27 – Johann Samuel Welter, composer
- date unknown
  - Sridhara Venkatesa Ayyaval, Hindu saint and composer (born 1635)
  - Jean Hotteterre, musician and composer
  - José Peyró, composer (born c. 1670)
  - Demoiselle Conradi, German opera singer
- probable
  - Antonia Bembo, singer and composer (born c. 1640)
  - Jean Baptiste Loeillet of Ghent, composer (born 1688)
  - Guillaume Minoret, composer (born c.1650)
  - Johann Speth, organist and composer (born 1664)
