= 1716 in music =

The year 1716 in music involved some significant events.

== Events ==
- July 1 – Domenico Zipoli joins the Society of Jesus. Soon afterwards he is sent on a mission to Paraguay.
- Georg Philipp Telemann visits Eisenach, resulting in an appointment as visiting Kapellmeister.
- Antonio Stradivari – completes Le Messie violin (The Messiah Stradivarius)
- Jonathan Swift conceives the idea for the Beggar's Opera.
- Giuseppe Tartini hears Francesco Maria Veracini play the violin, and is inspired.

== Classical music ==
- William Babell – The Fourth Book of the Ladys Entertainment
- Johann Sebastian Bach
  - Wachet, betet, seid bereit allezeit!, BWV 70a
  - Herz und Mund und Tat und Leben, BWV 147a
  - Mein Gott, wie lang, ach lange, BWV 155
  - Komm, du süsse Todesstunde, BWV 161
  - Ärgre dich, o Seele, nicht, BWV 186a
  - In dir ist Freude, BWV 615
- Diogenio Bigaglia – 12 Violin Sonatas, Op. 1
- Louis-Nicolas Clérambault – Cantates françoises, Book 3
- François Couperin
  - Second livre de pièces de clavecin
  - L'art de toucher le clavecin
- Evaristo Felice Dall'Abaco – 12 Violin Sonatas, Op. 4
- Domenico Elmi – Oboe Concerto in A minor
- Francesco Geminiani – 12 Violin Sonatas, Op. 1
- Georgio Gentili – 12 Violin Concertos, Op. 6
- Christoph Graupner
  - Verleih dass ich aus Herzensgrund, GWV 1114/16
  - Muss ich denn noch ferner leiden, GWV 1145/16
  - Gott ist für uns gestorben, GWV 1152/16
- George Frideric Handel
  - Concerto Grosso in F major, HWV 315
  - 6 Fugues, HWV 605–610
- Johann Kuhnau – Wenn ihr fröhlich seid an euren Festen
- Jean-Baptiste Loeillet – 12 Recorder Sonatas, Op. 4
- Michel Montéclair – Musette (Les festes de l'été)
- Giovanni Mossi – 12 Violin Sonatas, Op. 1
- Alessandro Scarlatti – Ombre tacite e sole
- Georg Philipp Telemann
  - Concerto for 3 Trumpets, 2 Oboes, Timpani and Strings in D major
  - Brockes Passion, TWV 5:1
  - Germania mit ihrem Chor, TWV 12:1c
  - Kleine Kammermusik
- Francesco Maria Veracini
  - Six Overtures (first performed, Venice)
  - 12 Sonate a violino o flauto solo e basso (manuscript)
- Robert di Visée – Pièces de théorbe et de luth
- Antonio Vivaldi
  - La stravaganza, Op. 4
  - 6 Violin Sonatas, Op. 5
  - 12 Concerti, Op.7
  - Violin Concerto in C major, RV 195
  - Violin Concerto in D major, RV 205
  - Violin Concerto in D minor, RV 245
  - Violin Concerto in F major, RV 292
  - Violin Concerto in G minor, RV 319
  - Violin Concerto in A major, RV 340
  - Violin Concerto in A major, RV 343
  - Gloria in D major, RV 589
  - Juditha Triumphans, RV 644
  - Recorder Sonata in G major, RV 806
- Jan Dismas Zelenka
  - Deus dux fortissime, ZWV 60
  - Da pacem Domine, ZWV 167
- Domenico Zipoli – Sonate d'intavolatura per organo e cimbalo, Op. 1

== Opera ==
- Antonio Maria Bononcini – Sesostri re d'Egitto
- Giuseppe Maria Buini – Armida abbandonata
- Francesco Ciampi – Timocrate
- Francesco Bartolomeo Conti – Il finto Policare
- Johann Christoph Pepusch – Apollo and Daphne
- Carlo Francesco Pollarolo – Ariodante
- Alessandro Scarlatti – Carlo re d'Allemagna
- Antonio Vivaldi
  - Arsilda Regina di Ponto
  - La costanza trionfante degl'amori e degl'odii, RV 706
  - L'incoronazione di Dario, RV 719

== Publications ==
- Johann Heinrich Buttstett – Ut, mi, sol, re, fa, la, tota musica et harmonia aeterna
- François Campion – Traité d'accompagnement et de composition
- Estienne Roger – Concerti a Cinque con Violini, Oboè, Violetta, Violoncello e Basso Continuo del Signori G. Valentini, A. Vivaldi, T. Albinoni, F. M. Veracini, G. St. Martin, A. Marcello, G. Rampin, A. Predieri

== Births ==
- February 9 – Johann Trier, composer
- March 21 – Josef Seger, composer (died 1782)
- April 12 – Felice Giardini, violinist and composer (died 1796)
- c. 1716/17 – John Beard, tenor and actor-manager (died 1791)

== Deaths ==
- August 3 – Sebastián Durón, composer (b. 1660)
- September 25 – Johann Christoph Pez, composer (b. 1664)
- October 1 – Giovanni Battista Bassani, composer, violinist and organist (born c. 1650)
- November – Johann Aegidus Bach, organist and uncle of Johann Sebastian (born 1645)
- December 1 – Johann Samuel Drese, composer (b. c. 1644)
- December 6 – Benedictus Buns, Dutch religious composer (b. 1642)
- date unknown – Carlo Giuseppe Testore, double bass maker (born c. 1665)
