= List of operas by Alessandro Scarlatti =

This is a list of the operas by Alessandro Scarlatti (1660–1725).

Scarlatti wrote 45 drammi per musica, also 7 melodrammi, 2 commedia per musica (or opere buffe), 2 opere drammatice, 2 favole boscherecce, 2 tragedie in musica, 1 commedia, 1 dramma pastorale, and 1 dramma sacro per musica.

== List ==
Title	Genre	Subdivisions	Libretto	Première date	Place, theatre
Gli equivoci nel sembiante	dramma per musica	3 acts	Pietro Filippo Bernini	February 1679	Rome, Giovanni Battista Contini's private theatre
L'honestà negli amori	dramma per musica	3 acts	Pietro Filippo Bernini	3 February 1680	Rome, teatro della Pace
Tutto il mal non vien per nuocere (revised as Dal male il bene Naples 1687)	commedia per musica	3 acts	Giuseppe Domenico de Totis	January 1681	Rome, Teatro Capranica
Il Pompeo	dramma per musica	3 acts	Nicolò Minato	25 January 1683	Rome, Teatro Colonna
L'Arsate		3 acts	Flavio Orsini	Carnival (19–20 February) 1683	Rome, palace Orsini 'a Pasquino' of Duke of Bracciano Flavio Orsini
L'Aldimiro overo Favor per favore	dramma per musica	3 acts	Giuseppe Domenico de Totis	6 November 1683	Naples, Palazzo Reale
La Psiche overo Amore innamorato	dramma per musica	3 acts	Giuseppe Domenico de Totis	21 December 1683	Naples, Palazzo Reale
Olimpia vendicata	dramma per musica	3 acts	Aurelio Aureli after Ludovico Ariosto	23 December 1685	Naples, Palazzo Reale
La Rosmene overo L'infedeltà fedele	melodramma	3 acts	Giuseppe Domenico de Totis	Carnival (15–16 February) 1686	Rome, Palazzo Doria Pamphili
Clearco in Negroponte	dramma per musica	3 acts	Antonio Arcoleo	21 December 1686	Naples, Palazzo Reale
La santa Dimna (act 3)	commedia per musica	3 acts	Benedetto Pamphili	Carnival (7–8 February) 1687	Rome, Palazzo Doria Pamphili
Il Flavio	dramma per musica	3 acts	after Matteo Noris	14 November 1688?	Naples, Palazzo Reale
L'Amazzone corsara overo L'Alvilda	dramma per musica	3 acts	Giulio Cesare Corradi	6 November 1689	Naples, Palazzo Reale
La Statira	dramma per musica	3 acts	Pietro Ottoboni	5 January 1690	Rome, Teatro Tordinona
Gli equivoci in amore overo La Rosaura	melodramma	3 acts	Giovanni Battista Lucini	December 1690	Rome, Palazzo Cancellaria
L'humanità nelle fiere overo Il Lucullo	dramma per musica	3 acts	—	25 February 1691	Naples, Teatro San Bartolomeo
La Teodora augusta	dramma per musica	3 acts	Adriano Morselli	6 November 1692	Naples, Palazzo Reale
Gerone tiranno di Siracusa	dramma per musica	3 acts	Aurelio Aureli	22 December 1692	Naples, Palazzo Reale
Il nemico di sé stesso			—	24 January 1693	Rome, Teatro Capranica
L'amante doppio overo Il Ceccobimbi	melodramma	3 acts	—	April 1693	Naples, Palazzo Reale
Pirro e Demetrio	dramma per musica	3 acts	Adriano Morselli	28 January 1694	Naples, Teatro San Bartolomeo
Il Bassiano overo Il maggior impossibile	melodramma	3 acts	Matteo Noris	spring 1694	Naples, Teatro San Bartolomeo
La santa Genuinda overo L'innocenza difesa dall'inganno (Act 2)	dramma sacro per musica	3 acts	Pietro Ottoboni	December 1694	Rome, Palazzo Doria Pamphili
Le nozze con l'inimico overo L'Analinda	melodramma	3 acts	—	1695	Naples, Teatro San Bartolomeo
Nerone fatto Cesare	melodramma	3 acts	Matteo Noris	6 November 1695	Naples, Palazzo Reale
Massimo Puppieno	melodramma	3 acts	Aurelio Aureli	26 December 1695	Naples, Teatro San Bartolomeo
Penelope la casta	dramma per musica	3 acts	Matteo Noris	23 February 1696? or 1694	Naples, Teatro San Bartolomeo, or Palermo
La Didone delirante	opera drammatica	3 acts	Francesco Maria Paglia, after Antonio Franceschi	28 May 1696	Naples, Teatro San Bartolomeo
Comodo Antonino	dramma per musica	3 acts	Francesco Maria Paglia, after Giacomo Francesco Bussani	18 November 1696	Naples, Teatro San Bartolomeo
L'Emireno ovvero Il consiglio dell'ombra	opera drammatica	3 acts	Francesco Maria Paglia	2 February 1697	Naples, Teatro San Bartolomeo
La caduta de' Decemviri	dramma per musica	3 acts	Silvio Stampiglia	15 December 1697	Naples, Teatro San Bartolomeo
Il prigioniero fortunato	dramma per musica	3 acts	Francesco Maria Paglia	14 December 1698	Naples, Teatro San Bartolomeo
Anacreonte	dramma per musica	3 acts	Giacomo Francesco Bussani	1698	Pratolino, Villa Medicea
La donna ancora è fedele	dramma per musica	3 acts	Domenico Filippo Contini	1698	Naples, Teatro San Bartolomeo
Gl'inganni felici	dramma per musica	3 acts	Apostolo Zeno	6 November 1699	Naples, Palazzo Reale
L'Eraclea	dramma per musica	3 acts	Silvio Stampiglia	30 January 1700	Naples, Teatro San Bartolomeo
Odoardo	dramma per musica	3 acts	Apostolo Zeno	5 May 1700	Naples, Teatro San Bartolomeo
Dafni	favola boschereccia	3 acts	Francesco Maria Paglia	5 August 1700	Naples, viceroy's villa at Posillipo
Laodicea e Berenice	dramma per musica	3 acts	after Matteo Noris	April 1701	Naples, Teatro San Bartolomeo
Il pastore di Corinto	favola boschereccia	3 acts	Francesco Maria Paglia	5 August 1701	Naples, viceroy's villa at Posillipo
Tito Sempronio Gracco	dramma per musica	3 acts	Silvio Stampiglia	February 1702	Naples, Teatro San Bartolomeo
Tiberio imperatore d'oriente	dramma per musica	3 acts	Giovanni Domenico Pallavicino	8 or 17 May 1702	Naples, Palazzo Reale
Il Flavio Cuniberto	dramma per musica	3 acts	Matteo Noris	September 1702? (not first performance?)	Pratolino, Villa Medicea
Arminio	dramma per musica	3 acts	Antonio Salvi	September 1703	Pratolino, Villa Medicea
Turno Aricino	dramma per musica	3 acts	Silvio Stampiglia	September 1704	Pratolino, Villa Medicea
Lucio Manlio l'imperioso	dramma per musica	3 acts	Silvio Stampiglia	September 1706	Pratolino, Villa Medicea
Il gran Tamerlano	dramma per musica	3 acts	Antonio Salvi after Jacques Pradon	September 1706	Pratolino, Villa Medicea
Il Mitridate Eupatore	tragedia in musica	5 acts	Girolamo Roberti Frigimelica	5 January 1707	Venice, Teatro San Giovanni Grisostomo
Il trionfo della libertà	tragedia in musica	5 acts	Girolamo Roberti Frigimelica	11 February 1707	Venice, Teatro San Giovanni Grisostomo
Il Teodosio	dramma per musica	3 acts	Vincenzo Grimani?	27 January 1709	Naples, Teatro San Bartolomeo
L'amor volubile e tiranno	dramma per musica	3 acts	Giovan Domenico Pioli and Giuseppe Papis	25 May 1709	Naples, Teatro San Bartolomeo
La principessa fedele	dramma per musica	3 acts	Agostino Piovene	8 February 1710	Naples, Teatro San Bartolomeo
La fede riconosciuta	dramma pastorale	3 acts	Benedetto Marcello?	14 October 1710	Naples, Teatro San Bartolomeo
Giunio Bruto overo La caduta dei Tarquini (Act 3)	dramma per musica	3 acts	Sinibaldi?		intended for Vienna, but cancelled
Il Ciro	dramma per musica	3 acts	Pietro Ottoboni	Carnival (8–9 February) 1712	Rome, Palazzo della Cancelleria
Scipione nelle Spagne	dramma per musica	3 acts	Apostolo Zeno	21 January 1714	Naples, Teatro San Bartolomeo
L'amor generoso	dramma per musica	3 acts	Giuseppe Papis and Silvio Stampiglia	1 October 1714	Naples, Palazzo Reale
Tigrane	dramma per musica	3 acts	Domenico Lalli	16 February 1715	Naples, Teatro San Bartolomeo
Carlo re d'Allemagna	dramma per musica	3 acts	Francesco Silvani	26 January 1716?	Naples, Teatro San Bartolomeo
La virtù trionfante dell'odio e dell'amore	dramma per musica	3 acts	Francesco Silvani	3 May 1716	Naples, Palazzo Reale
Telemaco	dramma per musica	3 acts	Carlo Sigismondo Capece	Carnival (28 February – 1 March) 1718	Rome, Teatro Capranica
Il trionfo dell'onore	commedia	3 acts	Francesco Antonio Tullio	26 November 1718	Naples, Teatro dei Fiorentini
Il Cambise	dramma per musica	3 acts	Domenico Lalli	4 February 1719	Naples, Teatro San Bartolomeo
Marco Attilio Regolo	dramma per musica	3 acts	Matteo Noris	Carnival (20–21 February) 1719	Rome, Teatro Capranica
Griselda	dramma per musica	3 acts	Apostolo Zeno, revised by Francesco Maria Ruspoli	January 1721	Rome, Teatro Capranica
