= Sinfonie di concerto grosso =

Twelve compositions (1715) by Alessandro Scarlatti

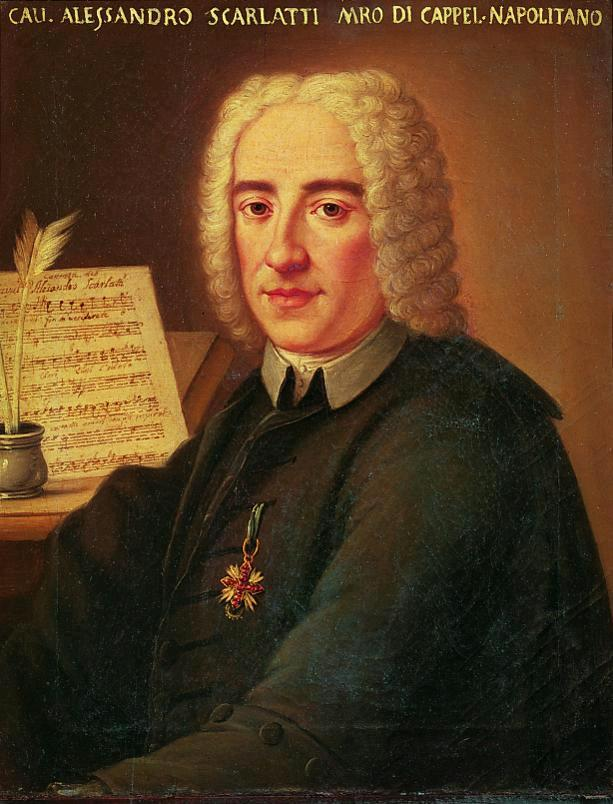
Alessandro Scarlatti

The Sinfonie di concerto grosso (R.533/1 to 12) is the title of twelve works for flute, strings and basso continuo by Alessandro Scarlatti, composed in Naples from June 1, 1715 – the same year as the performance of his opera Tigrane, one of his greatest successes, and his oratorio La Santissima Trinità.

== Composer ==
In 1715, at the age of fifty-five, Scarlatti was at the height of his career and creativity, with extraordinary fertility in all the vocal genres of his time. Yet, he called himself a "glory in decline" (letter to Ferdinando de' Medici). If he chose to write a collection of twelve instrumental works, it was perhaps with a view to publication. He also composed toccatas and variations for the keyboard, an ensemble of six concerti grossi (published in London in 1740), as well as seven sonatas for flute, two violins and continuo, dated the year of his death.

== Sinfonie ==
The twelve Sinfonie of 1715, which are part of this series of instrumental works, are preserved in a single manuscript, now in London. It bears the following words: cominciate al Po Giuno 1715 (begun on 1 June 1715), but no completion date is indicated. The orchestra also includes a viola, like a desire to cover the sound spectrum of the large orchestra. Each Sinfonia also includes a cello part distinct from the continuo.

The title appears only on the header of the first Sinfonia. The second is entitled Concertata con li ripieni, but the others have no title. Four are real concerti grossi with another solo instrument in addition to the recorder: a second flute (Nos. 1 and 5), one trumpet (No. 2), one oboe (No. 4) while eight are concertos for solo recorder, where the instrument shines especially in slow movements and joins the tutti in fast movements, each bringing its own colours to the ensemble's texture.

All the Sinfonie are in five movements, except for Nos. 4 and 9. The 4th is without a fast introductory movement and the 9th is added a minuet. The first movement is fast and usually ends on the dominant. The second is an Adagio transition, usually to a 3/4 time. The third is a fugue (sometimes with two themes), generally the most accomplished movement. This is followed by another transition Adagio, which leads to a rapid dance movement or a march that concludes the composition.

The last Sinfonia is the only one with a title, La geniale, which means "the charming, the brilliant" or most probably "the favorite" like the concerto RV277 by Vivaldi.

== Details ==
12 Sinfonie di concerto grosso (1715) for recorder, strings and basso continuo.

1. in F major, for two recorders, strings and continuo.
  Allegro. Adagio. Allegro. Adagio. Allegro [tarentelle]
2. in D major Concertata con li ripieni, for recorder, trumpet, strings and continuo.
  Spirituoso. Adagio. Allegro. Adagio. Presto.
3. in D minor, for recorder, oboe, strings and continuo.
  Vivace. Adagio. Andante. Adagio. Allegro [tarentelle].
4. in E minor, for recorder, strings and continuo.
  Vivace. Adagio. Allegro. Adagio. Allegro.
5. in D minor, for two recorders, strings and continuo.
  Spirituoso e staccato. Adagio. Allegro. Adagio. Allegro assai.
6. in A minor, for recorder, strings and continuo.
  Vivace. Adagio. Allegro. Adagio. Allegro.
7. in G minor, for recorder, strings and continuo.
  Moderato. Moderato (Allegro). Grave. Allegro.
8. in G major, for recorder, strings and continuo.
  Allegretto. Adagio. Allegro. Adagio. Vivace.
9. in G minor, for recorder, strings and continuo
  Vivace. Allegro. Moderato. Adagio. Allegretto. Menuet [tarentelle].
10. in A minor, for recorder, strings and continuo.
  Vivace. Adagio. Allegro. Adagio. Allegro.
11. in C major, for recorder, strings and continuo.
  Spirituoso. Lento. Allegro. Adagio. Allegro.
12. in C minor La geniale, for recorder, strings and continuo.
  Adagio. Andante giusto. Adagio. Andante moderato.

== Discography ==
=== Complete ===
- Sinfonie di Concerto grosso – William Bennett, flute; Leonore Smith, flute II (1 and 5); Bernard Soustrot, trumpet (2); Hans Helrost, oboe (4); I Musici (August 1980, 2 CDs Philips 400 017-2 and 434 160-2) OCLC 1040538911, 516566708
- Douze symphonies de concerto grosso – Solisti di Milano, dir. Angelo Ephrikian, 2 LPs Harmonia Mundi HM 308 / 2CD Rivo Alto) OCLC 461737530, 1040342183
- Concerti e sinfonie – La Magnifica Comunita, Enrico Casazza (October 1993, Tactus / 7 to 12 on Brilliant Classics 93357) OCLC 180757397
- 12 Sinfonie di Concerto Grosso – Corina Marti, recorder; Ann Allen, recorder II and oboe; Giuseppe Frau, trumpet; Alexandra Nigito, harpsichord; Capella Tiberina, concertmaster Paolo Perrone (2014, 2 CD Brilliant Classics 94658). OCLC 915671860

=== Selection ===
- Sinfonie di Concerto grosso; Concerti per flauto dolce : Sinfonie (Nos. 6, 7, 9 to 11) – Ensemble Musica Antiqua of Toulon, Christian Mendoze, recorder and direction (27–28 July 1994, Verany Records PV 795031) OCLC 659289539
- La Geniale : Sinfonie (Nos. 4, 8, 9 and 12) – Les Boréades (January 2009, Atma Classique ACD2 2606) OCLC 720652177
- Sinfonie di concerto grosso (Nos. 2, 6, 8–11) – Südwestdeutsches Kammerorchester, dir. Räto Tschupp (2016, Thorofon) OCLC 1001462728
