= Erminia (Scarlatti) =

Composition by Alessandro Scarlatti

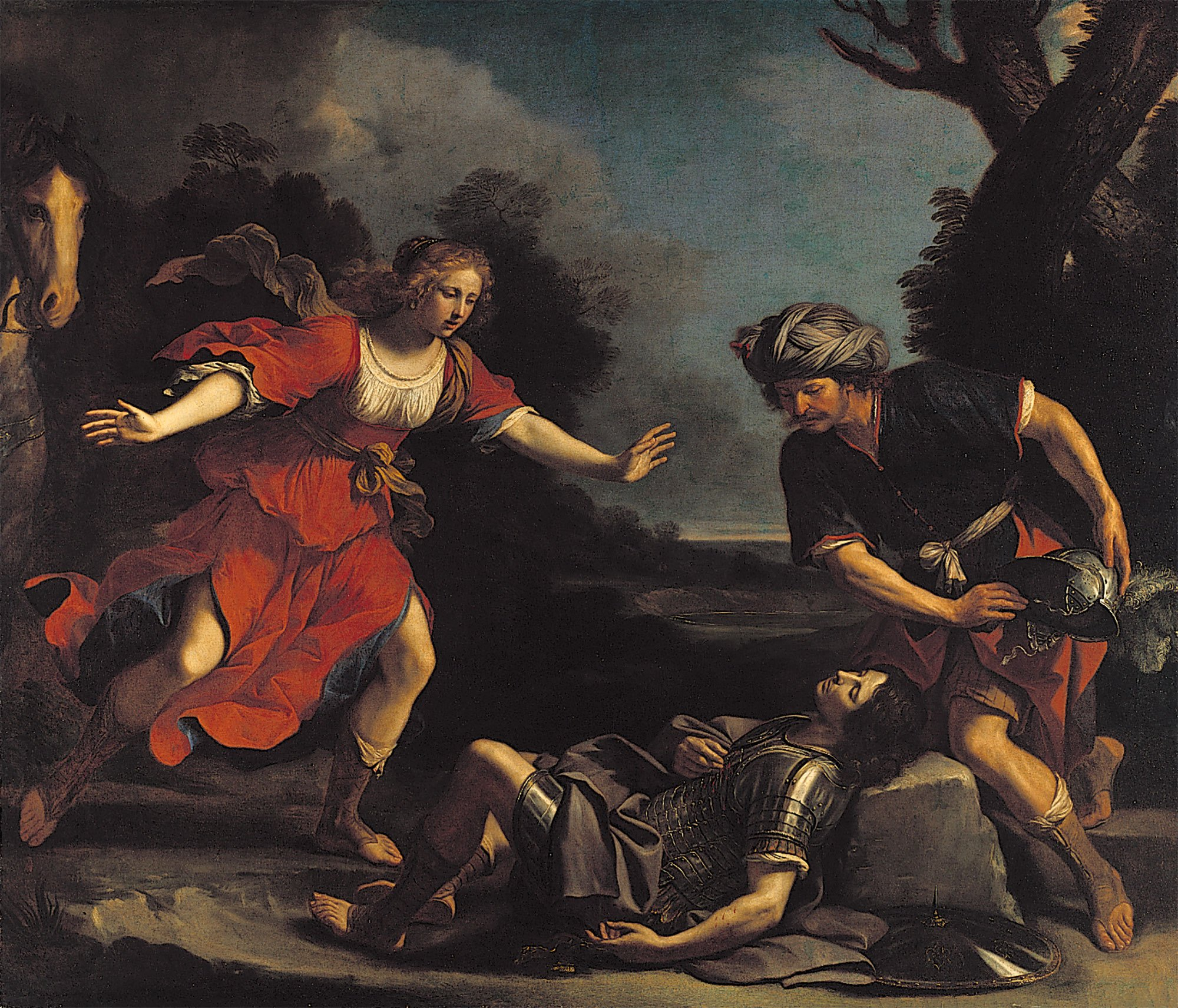
Erminia finds Tancredi injured, by Guercino (Edinburgh, Scottish National Gallery).

Erminia, Tancredi, Polidoro e Pastore (R.374.26) or more simply Erminia, is the last of the serenades by Italian composer Alessandro Scarlatti. Conceived for four voices, choir and orchestra, the work was created on the occasion of a wedding at the Palazzo Zevallos Stigliano in Naples on June 13, 1723, two years before the musician's death. The second part has gone astray in time and long considered lost or as an unfinished work. In the 2010s, fragments were found thanks to the Répertoire international des sources musicales.

The work has been performed several times in recent years, notably by the Concerto de' Cavalieri and its conductor, Marcello di Lisa and in early 2018, by the Opera Lafayette with Julia Dawson in the title-role.

== History ==
Erminia was commissioned on the occasion of the marriage between two great Neapolitan families, the Colonna, princes of Stigliano (Ferdinando) and Caracciolo de Santobono (Maria Luisa Caracciolo). Edward Dent considered the work as unfinished.

The composer's name is not mentioned in the material except in the contemporary Gazzetta di Napoli and on page five of the libretto, but the author of the text does not appear anywhere. The only known copy of the libretto, discovered in 1973 by Ulisse Prota-Giurleo, is kept at the Biblioteca Casanatense in Rome. Roberto Pagano suggests that the author of the text may be Pietro Metastasio, insofar as the most famous librettist of the 18th century was united by a deep friendship - caro gemello - with Carlo Broschi, i. e. Farinelli, who held the title role during the creation at just eighteen years. During his law studies in Naples between 1721 and 1723, Metastasio wrote some libretti inspired by antiquity, played in Naples: Angelica (1720), Endimione, Gli Orti esperidi (1721), Galatea (1722) and a few months before Scarlatti's work, La Forza della virtù. The author later rejected the early works cited above, particularly for the publication by Bettinelli, his Venetian publisher in 1733–1734. However, there are other possible authors for Erminia, in particular Silvio Stampiglia who, on retirement, lived in Naples at the time.

The other singers were Don Antonio Manna, a member of the Royal Chapel of Naples, and accustomed to comic roles in the Teatro San Bartolomeo (in 1708 he interpreted the demanding role of Polifemo in Handel's Aci, Galatea e Polifemo); Andrea Pacini another alto castrat (who had sung Vivaldi's Orlando furioso, Scarlatti's Griselda and Marco Attilio Regolo and later Scipion by Vinci and Rodelinda by Handel in London).

Like many oratorios of the time, the Serenata is in two parts. In this case, the work borrows more from the dramatic cantata than it pulls towards the opera, while the singers were always in costume, according to their role, For the oratorio, the break between the two parts was intended for the sermon, in the case of the serenata, it was an invitation to the consumption of fine food and drinks.

With Erminia, the composer, still considered in 1723 as a living artistic force, brings the best of the late Baroque musical tradition, reconciling it in a unique way with many styles and trends of the early 18th century.

== Roles and setting ==
Erminia, serenata a quattro voci con vari strumenti, Naples 1723

Erminia, princess	soprano	Farinelli (castrat)
Pastore, the shepherd	bass	Don Antonio Manna
Polidoro, knight	ténor	Annibale Pio Fabri
Tancredi, knight	contralto	Andrea Pacini (castrat)

The orchestra is composed of two flutes, two oboes, a bassoon, two trumpets (or horns), violins I and II, viola, cello, double bass and harpsichord. The choir is in four voices (SSAT).

The duration of the first part is about 40 minutes.

=== Synopsis ===
The story of Erminia borrows its argument from Jerusalem Delivered by Torquato Tasso (1575, Canto VII: Pastoral Care of Erminia). The action takes place in the countryside of Soria, on the banks of the Jordan River. Erminia, a Muslim princess, betrays her city for love of the invading Christian knight, Tancredi. But this one is in love with Clorinda. Erminia, jealous, disguises herself with Clorinda's armor in search of her lover.

The second part ends with a general celebration (commanded by the wedding ceremony). The librettist leaves Tasso and in order to unite the lovers Erminia and Tancredi, turns to Dante for inspiration — Canto V — where Francesca da Rimini (accompanied by Paolo Malatesta) tells the poet their story.

=== First part ===
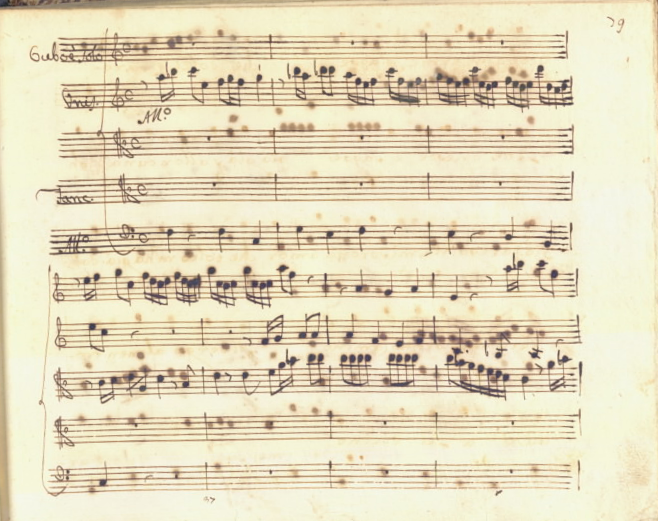
Introduction instrumentale de l'aria de Tancredi, Come suol veloce ardito (Naples), Ms. Cantate 269, folio 79.

Erminia Fuggitiva

- [Introduction]
- Ove smarrita e sola (recitativo), Erminia
- Al dolce nome (aria)
- Poiché già chiaro (recitativo)
- [Sinfonia da lontano]
- Qual odo in lontananza (recitativo)
- Cinta di rose (choir)
- D'innocente fanciulli (recitativo), Erminia
- A pascolar l'agnelle (choir)
- Se di piacere alcuno (recitativo)
- Ma di rustico albergo (recitativo), Erminia, Pastore
- Mentre quel solco (aria), Pastore
- Tra fortunati vostri alberghi (recitativo), Erminia, Pastore
- Vado al gregge (duo), Erminia, Pastore
- In van credete (recitativo), Polidoro
- Finché il fulmine (aria), Polidoro
- Da quelle, che sul verde ameno prato (recitativo), Polidoro, Erminia
- Son raminga pastorella (aria), Erminia
- Troppo gentil tu sei (recitativo), Polidoro, Erminia
- Come suol veloce ardito (aria), Tancredi
- Così dal ferro ostil (recitativo), Tancredi, Pastore
- Quando irato il toro mugge (aria), Pastore
- Tancredi, e dove mai così ansante (recitativo), Polidoro, Tancredi
- Ha nei begl'occhi (aria), Polidoro
- Mentre albergo e ristoro cerchi (recitativo), Polidoro, Tancredi
- Di fortuna e d'Amore tra gl'inganni (aria), Tancredi
- Qui dove al germogliar (recitativo), Erminia
- Torbido, irato e nero (aria), Erminia.

=== Second part ===
Tancredi, Pastore e Polidoro

Arias recovered.

- Che piacer! Che diletto! (recitativo) — GB-Lbl Add. 14209, folios 92r-99v
- Quando irato il toro mugge (aria), Pastore — folios 106r-115v
- Mentre quel solco ara il bifolco — folios 116r-123r
- Vado al gregge e meco viene — folios 132r-145r
- Mentr’ella offesa langue (aria), Pastore, n° 38 du livret — GB-Lbl Add. 14166 folios 81r-83v

== Manuscripts ==
First part

- Naples, Conservatoire San Pietro a Majella, (Cantata 269) RISM 850009682
- Monte Cassino, I-MC (5-F-9) RISM 852029908
- London, Royal College of Music, MS 577

Second part

- London, British Library, GB-Lbl (Add. 14166) RISM 806154101
- London, British Library, GB-Lbl (Add. 14209, folios 92r-99v) RISM 806155771

== Modern scores ==
- Erminia [part I], Thomas Edward Griffin, Rome, Istituto Italiano per la storia della musica 2010 OCLC 818729527

== Bibliography ==
- Dent, Edward J. (1960). Alessandro Scarlatti; his life and works. London: E. Arnold. p. 259.
- Pagano, Roberto; Bianchi, Lino; Rostirolla, Giancarlo (1972). Alessandro Scarlatti (in Italian). Turin: ERI (Edizioni RAI Radiotélévisions Italians). p. 612. OCLC 906095410.
- Griffin, Thomas (2011). Introduction; Erminia (PDF). Frascati. p. 12. Griffin2011.
- Griffin, Thomas (2013). "Some Late Scarlatti Recovered: Part Two of Alessandro Scarlatti's Serenata Erminia (1723)". Studi musicali. Vol. 4, no. 1. Rome: Accademia Nazionale di Santa Cecilia. pp. 101–113. ISBN 978-88-95341-51-4. ISSN 0391-7789. Griffin2013.
