= Messa di Santa Cecilia =

Composition by Alessandro Scarlatti

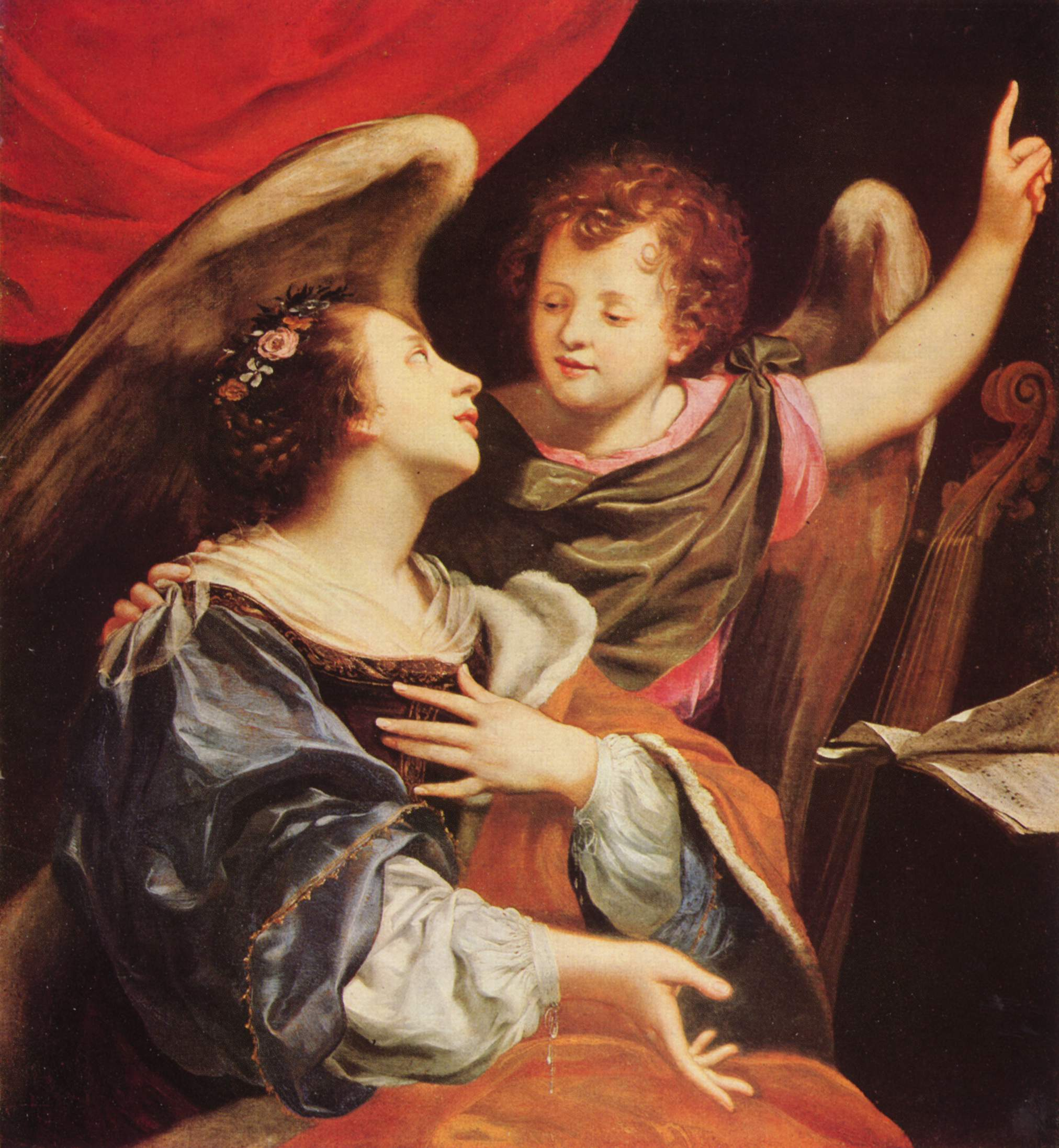
Cécile with an angel by Simon Vouet (first half of the 17th century, Museum of Fine Arts (Budapest)).

The Messa di Santa Cecilia (mass of Saint Cecilia) is a religious work by Alessandro Scarlatti, written in 1720 for five soloists (SSATB), choir and orchestra, commissioned by and dedicated to cardinal Francesco Acquaviva of Aragona.

Scarlatti was sixty years old at the time and composed at the beginning of the 18th century, in a modern style of the period, characterised by brio and seduction, which culminated in the great masses of Bach and Beethoven and "seems to foretell Haydn's last masses". This remarkable work, "coronation of all his church music", almost contemporary of Bach's Magnificat (1723), has nothing to envy to it, "both in terms of musical interest and stylistic synthesis of early 18th century trends".

== Details ==
- Kyrie, in A major
- Gloria
- Credo
- Sanctus
- Agnus Dei, in A major

The execution time of the 923 bars is about 52 min. The Gloria is the most developed, exceeding 23 min. and the Credo which follows reaches 14 min.

== Analysis ==
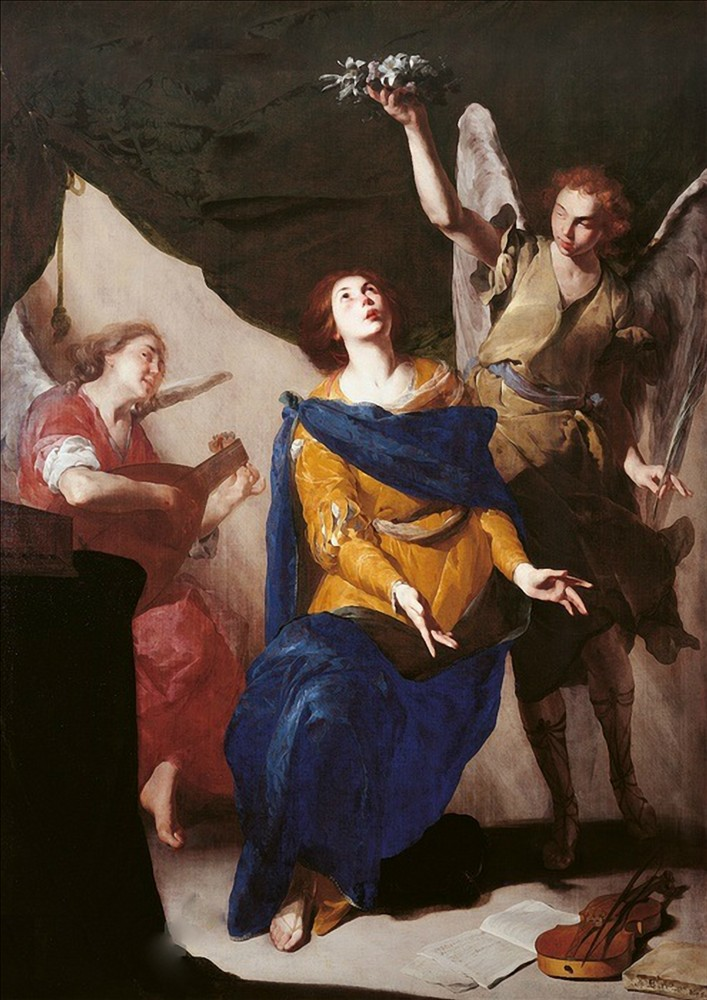
Santa Cecilia in estasi by Bernardo Cavallino in 1645 (Museo di Capodimonte, Naples).

Scarlatti's writing from the Kyrie is lively on the strings, close to Vivaldi and the Bolognese; the choir's interventions alternate or overlap with the singing decorated with soloists. The composer ends the Gloria with its complex structure, with an impressive five-part fugue on Cum Sancto Spirito, the subject of which is provided by the Gregorian intonation of the Mass to Saint-Cecilia, Dilecisti. The Credo, which in its style looks more to the future, is close to the writing of his own Stabat Mater, but more to that of Pergolesi seventeen years later. The joyful precipitation of the Et resurenxit which "intensifies to the tumult", contrasts with the sudden stop on et mortuo in a striking effect. The movement concludes with a fugue that takes up the subject of the Gloria in a completely different development. In the Agnus Dei, Scarlatti merges the old (voice) and new (strings) styles, until they are reversed.

In addition to the mass, still in 1720, Scarlatti composed almost as long (40 min.) vespers, discovered more recently, both scores being intended for the Santa Cecilia in Trastevere church. In 1708, he had composed Il Martirio di Santa Cecilia, inspired by the same figure, Santa Cecilia in Trastevere, patron saint of musicians.

== Manuscripts ==
- Rome, Biblioteca Casanatense, Ms. 2257.
- Münster, Santini-Bibliothek, D-Müs

== Modern editions ==
- St. Cecilia Mass (1720) for SSATB soli and chorus, string orchestra, and organ continuo, ed. John Steel, Novello 1968 OCLC 679576508 — after the Roman manuscript.

== Recordings ==
- Blanche Christensen, Jean Preston, soprano; Beryl-Jensen Smiley, alto; Ronald Christensen, tenor; Warren Wood, bass; the Alumnenchor of the University of Utah and the Utah Symphony, dir. Maurice Abravanel (1961, LP Amadeo AVRS5001 / Amadeus / Vanguard Records / "Alessandro Scarlatti collection", vol. 5, Brilliant Classics) OCLC 772703252, 657400201, OCLC 1031705213, 47016549
- Elizabeth Harwood, Wendy Eathorne, sopranos; Margaret Cable, alto; Wynford Evans, tenor; Christopher Keyte, bass; John Scott, organ; The Choir of St John's College, Cambridge; The Wren Orchestra, dir. George Guest (3-4 August 1978, LP Argo ZRG 903 / Decca Records "Seranata" 430 631-2 / "Double" 458 370–2) OCLC 77414310, 1019824531

== See also ==
- Il Martirio di Santa Cecilia

== Bibliography ==
- Edwin Hanley (October 1962). "Alessandro Scarlatti: Messa di Santa Cecilia". The Musical Quarterly. Vol. 48, no. 4. pp. 548–550. doi:10.1093/mq/XLVIII.4.548. ISSN 0027-4631. OCLC 5556199953.
- de Nys, Carl; Honegger, Marc (1992). "Messe et Vêpres pour la fête de sainte-Cécile, d'Alessandro Scarlatti". Dictionnaire des œuvres de la musique vocale (in French). Vol. II (G-O). Paris: Éditions Bordas. pp. 1291–1292. ISBN 2040153950. OCLC 25239400.
- Alessandro Scarlatti; Ferdinando de' Medici, Grand Prince of Tuscany (1995). Mon respectueux, mon profond silence parle pour moi; Correspondance d'Alessandro Scarlatti et de Ferdiand de Médicis. Petite bibliothèque Ombre (in French). Toulouse: Ombre. p. 115. ISBN 2-84142-016-7. OCLC 1033722311.
- Sylvie Buissou, Messa di Santa Cecilia (1720), in Edmond Lemaître (dir.) (1992). Guide de la musique sacrée et chorale, l'âge baroque 1600–1750. Les Indispensables de la musique (in French). Paris: Fayard. pp. 668–669. ISBN 2-213-02606-8. OCLC 708322577.
