= Stabat Mater (Scarlatti) =

Composition by Alessandro Scarlatti

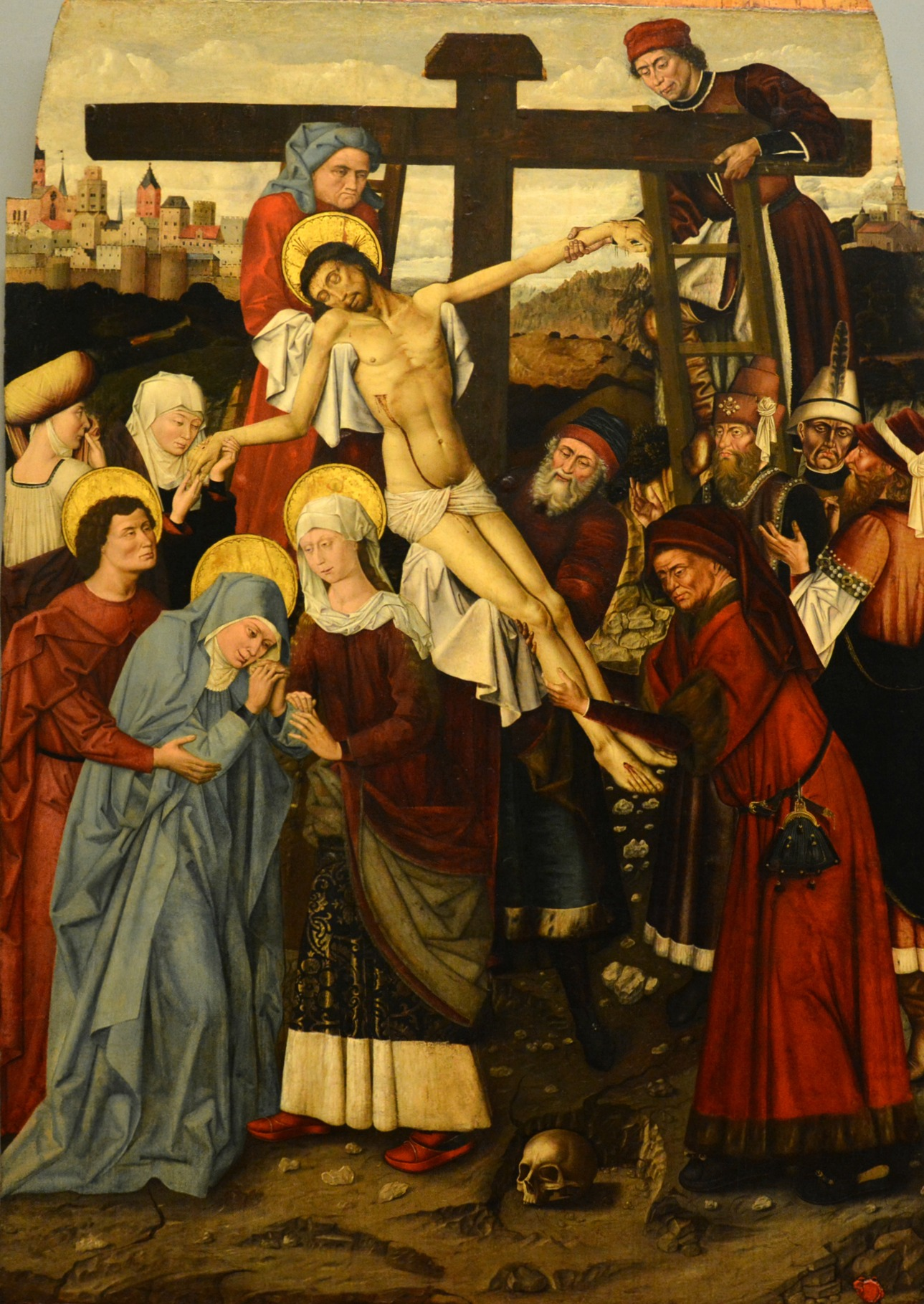
The "Deposizione", mid-15th century, by Napolitan Colantonio (Naples, Museo di Capodimonte).

Stabat Mater by Alessandro Scarlatti is a religious musical work composed for two voices (soprano/alto), two violins and basso continuo, in 1724, on a commission from the Order of Friars Minor, the "Knights of the Virgin of Sorrows" of the Church of San Luigi in Naples for Lent

The text, the Stabat Mater sequence, is a 13th-century liturgical text meditating on the suffering of Mary, mother of Christ.

Considered outdated by those who had ordered it, Scarlatti's work was replaced in 1736 by the famous Stabat Mater by Giovanni Battista Pergolesi.

Scarlatti set the Stabat Mater three times. There is another manuscript of a three-part Stabat Mater, dated 1715 and kept in Naples (Stabat Mater [II]) and a third work, composed for four voices, dated 1723, but now lost (Stabat Mater [III]).

== Description ==
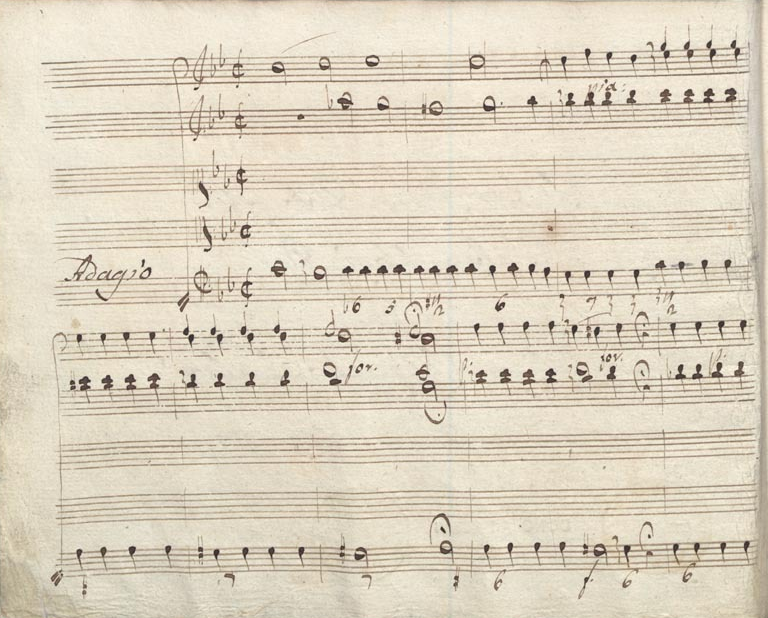
First page of the Stabat Mater in a copy from the 18th century, kept in Florence at the Conservatorio Luigi Cherubini

The Stabat Mater consists of eighteen pieces that can be grouped into four parts, starting and ending with a duet.

Scarlatti inverts verses 10 and 11 and groups verse 13 with verse 14, and verse 15 also plays verses 16 and 17 in a recitative. That is eighteen numbers for twenty verses.

Scarlatti's late composition impresses by its extraordinary musical richness, variety of forms, chromatic freedom and flexibility of expression. Thus the work is one of his most popular religious works today.

A performance takes about forty minutes.

- Stabat Mater dolorosa, a due – Adagio
- Cujus animam gementem, canto solo – Moderato e dolce
- O quam tristis, alto solo – Poco andante
- Quae moerebat et dolebat, a due – Adagio
- Quis est homo, canto solo – Andante
- Quis non posset contritari, alto solo – Andantino
- Pro peccatis suae gentis, canto solo – Moderato
- Vidit suum dulcem natum, a due – Moderato
- Pia Mater, canto solo – Andantino
- Sancta Mater, alto solo – Andante moderato
- Fac ut ardeat cor meum, canto solo – Andante molto
- Tui nati vulnerati, a due – Adagio
- Juxta crucem, alto solo – Andante smorzato
- Virgo virginum praeclara, canto solo – Allegro
- Fac ut portem Christi mortem, alto solo – Recitativo – Adagio e piano
- Inflammatus et accensus, canto solo – Andantino
- Fac me cruce custodiri, alto solo – Recitativo – Largo
- Quando corpus morietur, a due – Adagio e piano – Allegro

== Manuscript ==
- Florence, Conservatorio Luigi Cherubini, I-Fc (Ms.B 2353b).

== Discography ==
- Stabat Mater [I] – Mirella Freni, soprano; Teresa Berganza, mezzo-soprano; Paul Kuentz chamber orchestra, conductor Charles Mackerras (1976, Deutsche Grammophon) OCLC 462158422
- Stabat Mater [I], Salve Regina [V] – Véronique Diestchy, soprano; Alain Zaepffel, countertenor; Ensemble Gradiva (7-9 August 1988, Adda 581048 / Accord) OCLC 715318623
- Stabat Mater [I] – Gemma Bertagnolli, soprano; Sara Mingardo, contralto; Concerto Italiano, dir. Rinaldo Alessandrini (1998, Opus 111 30-160 / Naïve Records OP30441) OCLC 743092681, 854864740 — with Pergolesi
- Stabat Mater [I], Salve Regina [III] – Sandrine Piau, soprano; Gérard Lesne, alto; Il Seminario musicale (1998, Virgin 5 45366 2) OCLC 610653748
- Stabat Mater [I] – Emma Kirkby, soprano; Daniel Taylor, countertenor; Theatre Of Early Music (26-29 August 2004, Atma Classique) OCLC 872510202

== Bibliography ==
- Edwin Hanley (July 1953). "Alessandro Scarlatti – Stabat Mater by Alessandro Scarlatti; Rosanna Giancola; Miti Truccato-Pace; O. Scuola Veneziana, dir. Angelo Ephrikian". The Musical Quarterly. Vol. 39, no. 3. pp. 493–496. ISSN 0027-4631. OCLC 5556273550. enregistrement : OCLC:1007458967
- Cantagrel, Gilles (1989). Stabat Mater. pp. 2–5. OCLC 715318623.
- Poensgen, Benedikt Johannes (2004). Die Offiziumskompositionen von Alessandro Scarlatti [The Office Compositions of Alessandro Scarlatti] (PhD thesis) (in German). University of Hamburg.
