= Henry Hargrave =

English composer

Henry Hargrave (1720–1780) was an English composer. He is best known for his set of five concertos for bassoon or cello and strings (c. 1765).
