= Carlo re d'Allemagna =

Opera by Alessandro Scarlatti

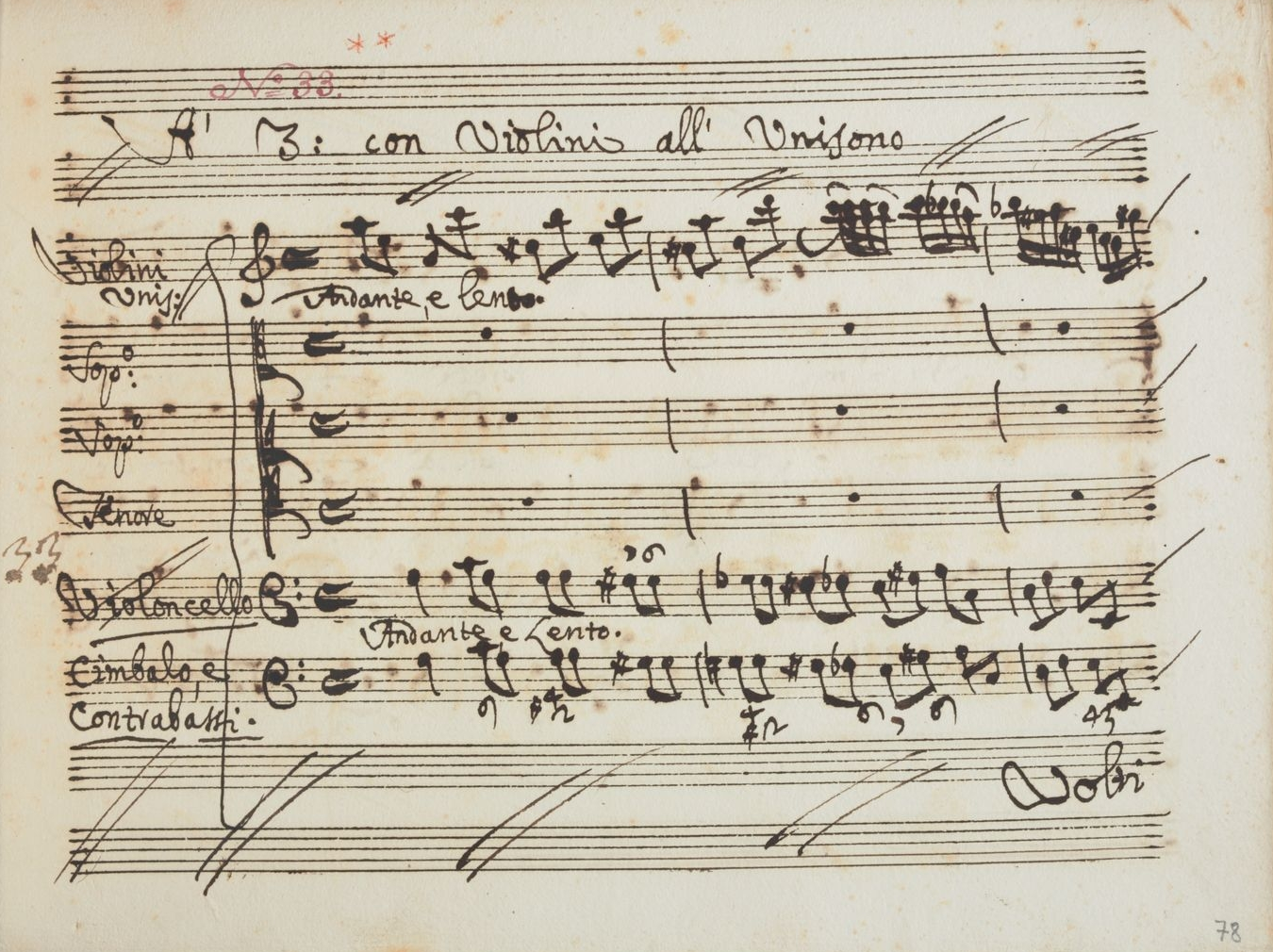
First page of the trio that concludes the opera

Carlo re d'Allemagna is a three-act dramma per musica by Italian composer Alessandro Scarlatti to a libretto by Giuseppe Papis, after Francesco Silvani, premiered at the Teatro San Bartolomeo of Naples on 26 or 30 January 1716. This is the composer's 79th opera out of 114 composed.

Silvani's libretto was already set to music by Benedetto Vinaccesi in Venice in 1698, under the title L'innocenza giustificata and another set to music by Giuseppe Maria Orlandini in Ferrara in 1712, but under the title L'innocenza difesa and given again in Bologna and Parma in 1713 and 1714, shortly before Scarlatti's opera. Papis adds comic roles (Amilla and Bleso) to Silvani's drama, a contrast much appreciated in Naples, absent from Silvani's original libretto, which play the role of intermezzi at the end of the acts.

The title refers to Charles the Bald and Judith of Bavaria.

== Roles ==
- Lotario, German Emperor, performed by Senesino at the premiere
- Giuditta, Empress Dowager, performed by Margherita Durastanti at the premiere
- Adalgiso, the son: Pietro Casati at the premiere
- Gildippe, the daughter: Agata Landi at the premiere
- Berardo, knight of the court
- Asprando, court traitor
- Amilla, Giuditta's maid
- Bleso, valet of Lotario

== Synopsis ==
Lotario plots against his half-brother Carlo and his mother-in-law Giuditta to gain access to the throne he covets.

== Recordings ==
- Carlo re d'Allemagna – Romina Basso, contralto (Lotario); Roberta Invernizzi, soprano (Giuditta); Marina de Liso, mezzo-soprano (Gildippe); Marianne Beate Kielland, mezzo-soprano (Adalgiso); Carlo Allemano, tenor (Berardo); Josè Maria Lo Monaco, mezzo-soprano (Asprando); Damiana Pinti, alto (Armilla); Roberto Abbondanza, bass (Bleso); Orchestre symphonique de Stavanger, conductor/violin Fabio Biondi (30 November – 4 December 2009, 3CD Agogique AGO015) OCLC 1040849067 – The recording does not include eleven of the opera's 46 arias.

Sinfonia and arias

- "Del ciel sui giri" (Lotario), in Arias pour Senesino – Andreas Scholl; Accademia Bizantina, conductor Ottavio Dantone (25–26 and 28–30 June 2004, Decca Records 475 6569)
- "Sinfonia avanti l'opera"; "Quel cor ch'un regio serto"; "Il mio cor costante e fido" "Aure voi che susurrando", in Arie et sinfonie – Daniela Barcellona, contralto. Concerto de Cavalieri, dir. Marcello Di Lisa (23 to 24 August 2010, Deutsche Harmonia Mundi 88697842162) OCLC 801798608

== See also ==
- Lotario (1729), opera by Handel
