= Diogenio Bigaglia =

Venetian Baroque composer

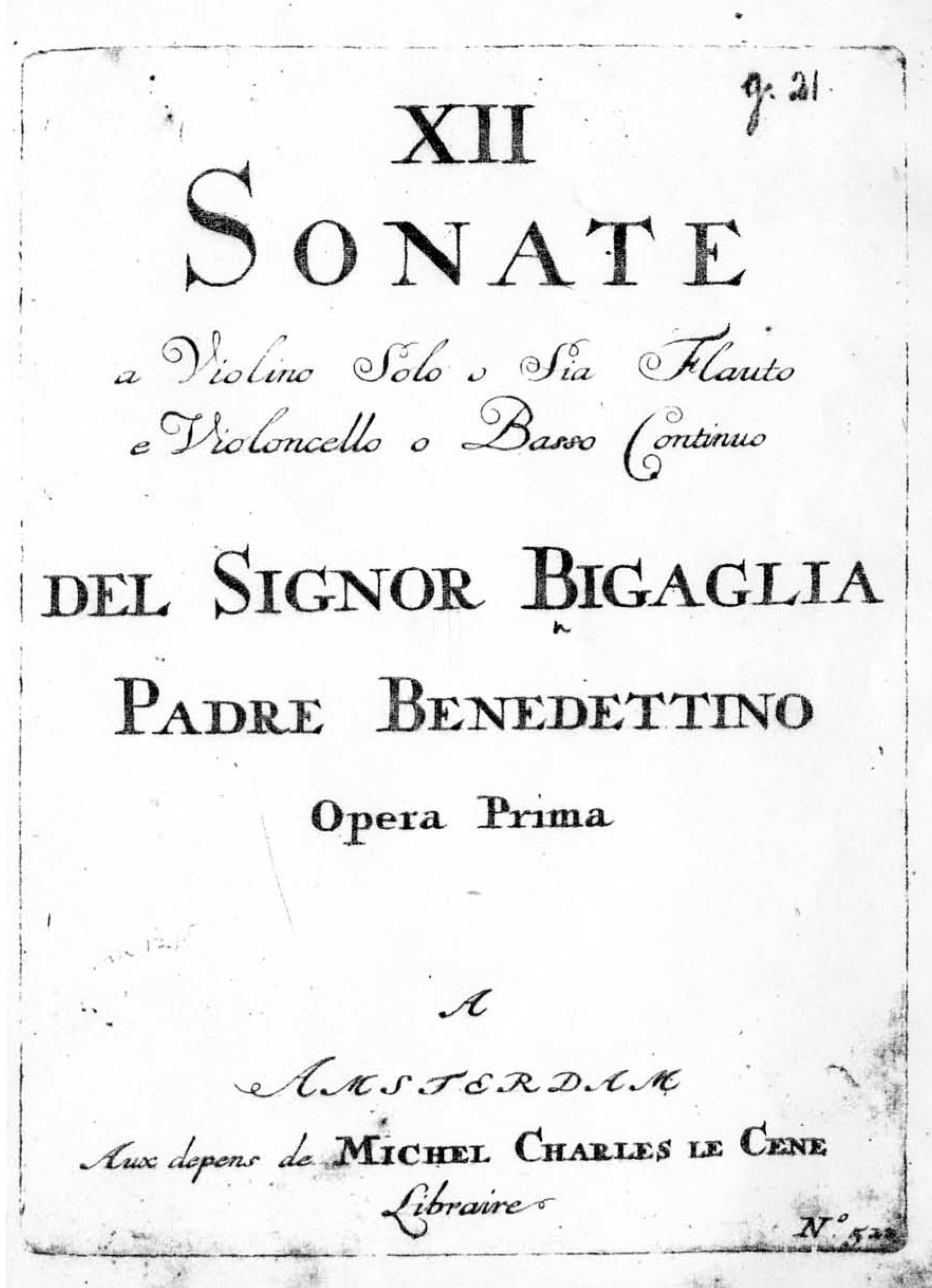
- Title-page of the XII Sonate a Violino Solo o sia Flauto, Amsterdam: Le Cène, circa 1722
- Born: about 1676; Murano, Republic of Venice
- Died: about 1745; Venice, Republic of Venice
- Occupation: Benedictine monk
- Writing career
- Language: Italian

Diogenio Bigaglia (about 1678–1745) was a Venetian monk, and a well-known composer and virtuoso of his time.

== Life ==
Bigaglia was born on the island of Murano, just north of Venice. He entered the Benedictine monastery of San Giorgio Maggiore in Venice in 1694. In 1700 he was ordained a priest, and in 1713 became the prior of the monastery.

== Works ==
He composed both sacred and secular vocal works. Little survives of his larger sacred compositions. His instrumental music includes several polyphonic concerti and solo works, notably his Opera Prima, XII Sonate a Violino Solo o Sia Flauto e Violoncello o Basso Continuo ('12 sonatas for violin or recorder and violoncello or basso continuo'), published by Le Cène in Amsterdam in about 1722 or 1723.
