= José Peyró =

Spanish composer

José Peyró or Joseph Peiró (c.1670–1720) was a Spanish theatre composer, born in Aragon. He composed the music for several early 18th century revivals of autos sacramentales and plays of Pedro Calderón de la Barca. His music survives to a revival of La Paz Universal o El Lirio y la Azucena which was originally performed in 1660 to celebrate the Treaty of the Pyrenees and the marriage of the Spanish princess María Teresa and Louis XIV of France.
