= Giovanni Mossi =

Italian Baroque composer

Giovanni Mossi (c. 1680 in Rome – 1742 in Rome) was an Italian baroque composer.

== Life ==
Born in 1680, many of the details of the life of Giovanni Mossi appear to be lost. Mossi was active in Rome around 1700 and is grouped stylistically with the "Roman school" of the period, along with others such as Giuseppe Valentini. He was known as a regular violinist at productions by Ottoboni, Pamphilj, and Ruspoli. From what can be observed in his extant works, he appears to have been a skilled and innovative composer. He is most known for his collection of violin sonatas.

== Selected works ==
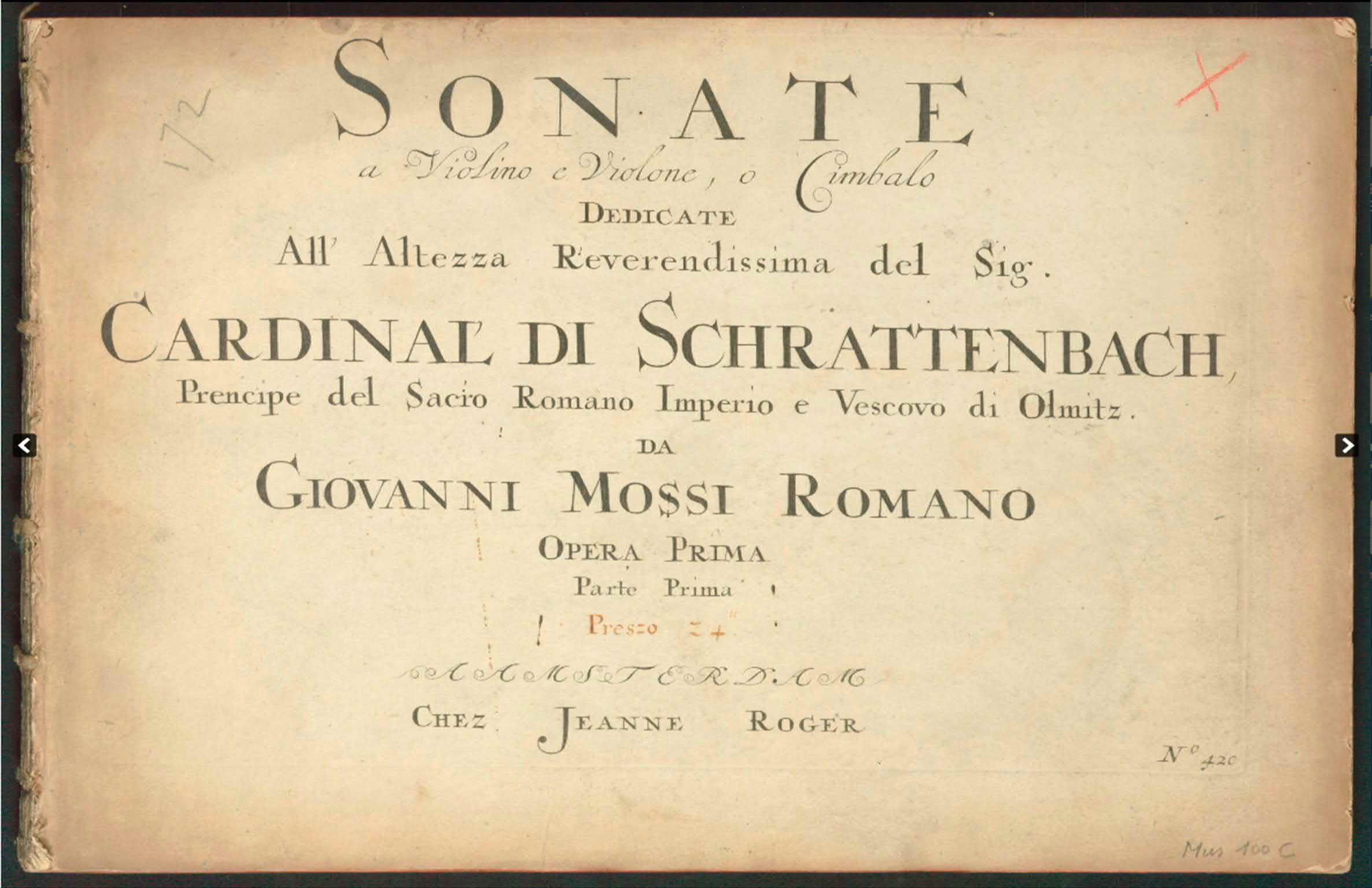
Front page of Mossi's 12 violin Sonatas Op. 1, Published by Jeanne Rodger in Amsterdam 1716

- Op. 1: 12 sonate per violino, violone o clavicembalo (1716), originally published by Michel-Charles Le Cène in 1716.
- Op. 2: 8 concerti a 3 e a 5 (c. 1720)
- Op. 3: 6 concerti a 6 (c. 1720)
- Op. 4: 12 concerti (1727)
- Op. 5: 12 sonate o sinfonie per violino e violoncello (1727)
- Op. 6: 12 sonate da camera per violino, violoncello o clavicembalo (1733) published under Michel-Charles Le Cène.
- Minuetto in la maggiore
