= L'honestà negli amori =

1680 opera by Alessandro Scarlatti

- Opera by Alessandro Scarlatti
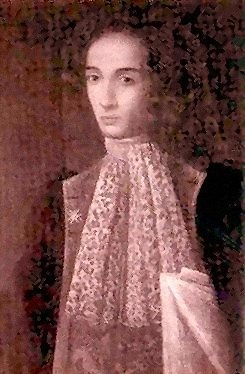
- The composer as a young man
- Translation: Honesty in Love Affairs
- Librettist: Felice Parnasso (pen name for Gian Lorenzo Bernini or D. F. Bernini or Domenico Filippo Contini)
- Language: Italian
- Premiere: 3 February 1680; Teatro di Palazzo Bernini, Rome

L'honestà negli amori, is a dramma per musica in 3 acts by composer Alessandro Scarlatti. The opera is also known by its English title, Honesty in Love Affairs.

Written in 1680, when Scarlatti was 19 years old, it was his second opera. The opera uses an Italian language libretto that was written by either Gian Lorenzo Bernini, D. F. Bernini, or Domenico Filippo Contini, under the pen name "Felice Parnasso".

The work premiered at the Teatro di Palazzo Bernini, the palace of Giovanni Bernini, in Rome on 3 February 1680. The opera was performed again in 1682 in Acquaviva delle Fonti at the Palazzo De Mari with Acquaviva laureata, a serenata composed by Giovanni Cesare Netti.

Though the opera is obscure today, its aria "Già il sole dal Gange" (The Sun from the Orient), has achieved some popularity. The aria has been recorded by several notable opera singers, including Cecilia Bartoli and Luciano Pavarotti. In the opera, the song is sung by the character of Saldino, a page boy, who is admiring the sunrise in Algeria.
