= Johann Samuel Welter =

German composer

Johann Samuel Welter (27 August 1650, in Obersontheim – 27 July 1720, in Schwäbisch Hall) was a German composer.

== Recordings ==
- Johann Samuel Welter - Gott sey uns gnädig ecco la musica, Heike Hümmer, Matthias Sprinz Christophorus, 2019
