= Alessandro Scarlatti =

Italian Baroque composer (1660–1725)

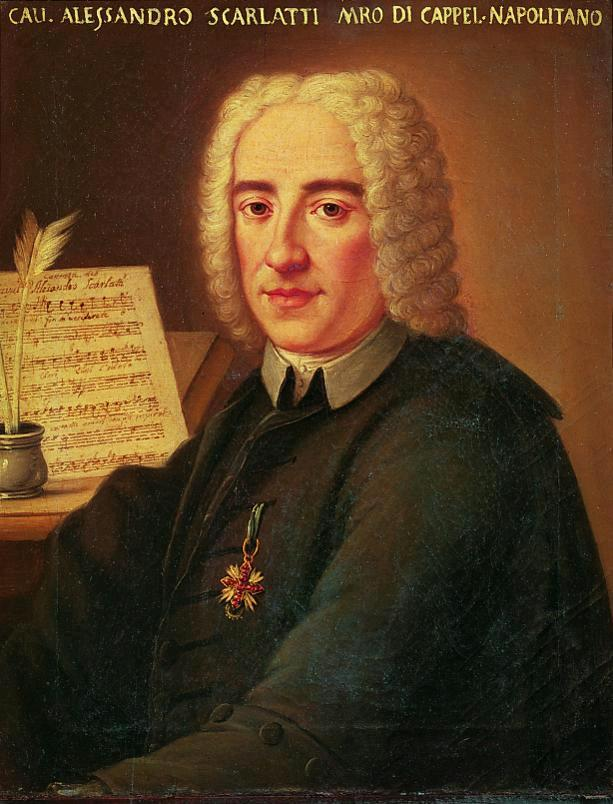
- Born: Pietro Alessandro Gaspare Scarlatti; 2 May 1660; Palermo or Trapani, Sicily
- Died: 22 October 1725 (aged 65); Naples
- Occupation: Composer
- Works: List of operas
- Style: Baroque

Pietro Alessandro Gaspare Scarlatti (2 May 1660 – 22 October 1725) was an Italian Baroque composer, known especially for his operas and chamber cantatas. He is considered the most important representative of the Neapolitan School of opera.

Nicknamed by his contemporaries "the Italian Orpheus", he divided his career between Naples and Rome; a significant part of his works was composed for the papal city. He is often considered the founder of the Neapolitan School, although he has only been its most illustrious representative: his contribution, his originality and his influence were essential, as well as lasting, both in Italy and in Europe.

Particularly known for his operas, he brought the Italian dramatic tradition to its maximum development, begun by Monteverdi at the beginning of 17th century and continued by Cesti, Cavalli, Carissimi, Legrenzi and Stradella, designing the final form of the da capo aria, imitated throughout Europe. He was also the inventor of the Italian overture in three movements (which was of the highest importance in the development of the symphony), of the four-part sonata (progenitor of the modern string quartet), and of the technique of motivic development. He was a model for the musical theatre of his time, as evoked by Handel's Italian works, who was deeply influenced by his theatrical music. Eclectic, Scarlatti also worked on all the other common genres of his time, from the sonata to the concerto grosso, from the motet to the mass, from the oratorio to the cantata, the latter being a genre in which he was an undisputed master.

He was the father of two other composers, Giuseppe Domenico Scarlatti and Pietro Filippo Scarlatti.

== Life ==
Scarlatti was born in Palermo (or in Trapani), then part of the Kingdom of Sicily. He received his first musical education from his family in Palermo.

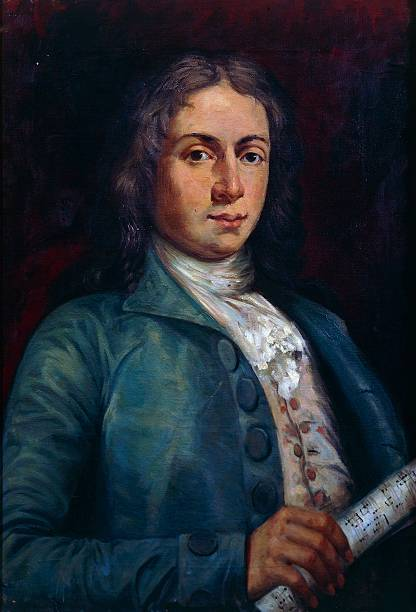
Portrait of Scarlatti as an adolescent

He is generally said to have been a pupil of Giacomo Carissimi in Rome, and some theorize that he had some connection with northern Italy because his early works seem to show the influence of Stradella and Legrenzi. The production at Rome of his opera Gli equivoci nel sembiante (1679) gained him the support of Queen Christina of Sweden (who at the time was living in Rome), and he became her maestro di cappella. In February 1684 he became maestro di cappella to the viceroy of Naples, perhaps through the influence of his sister, an opera singer, who might have been the mistress of an influential Neapolitan noble. Here he produced a long series of operas, remarkable chiefly for their fluency and expressiveness, as well as other music for state occasions.

In 1702 Scarlatti left Naples and did not return until the Spanish domination had been superseded by that of the Austrians. In the interval he enjoyed the patronage of Ferdinando de' Medici, Grand Duke of Tuscany, for whose private theatre near Florence he composed operas, and of Cardinal Ottoboni, who made him his maestro di cappella, and procured him a similar post at the Basilica di Santa Maria Maggiore in Rome in 1703.

After visiting Venice and Urbino in 1707, Scarlatti took up his duties in Naples again in 1708, and remained there until 1717. By this time Naples seems to have become tired of his music; the Romans, however, appreciated it better, and it was at the Teatro Capranica in Rome that he produced some of his finest operas (Telemaco, 1718; Marco Attilio Regolò, 1719; La Griselda, 1721), as well as some noble specimens of church music, including a Messa di Santa Cecilia for chorus and orchestra, composed in honor of Saint Cecilia for Cardinal Francesco Acquaviva in 1721. His last work on a large scale appears to have been the unfinished Erminia serenata for the marriage of the prince of Stigliano in 1723. He died in Naples in 1725 and is entombed there at the church of Santa Maria di Montesanto.

== Music ==
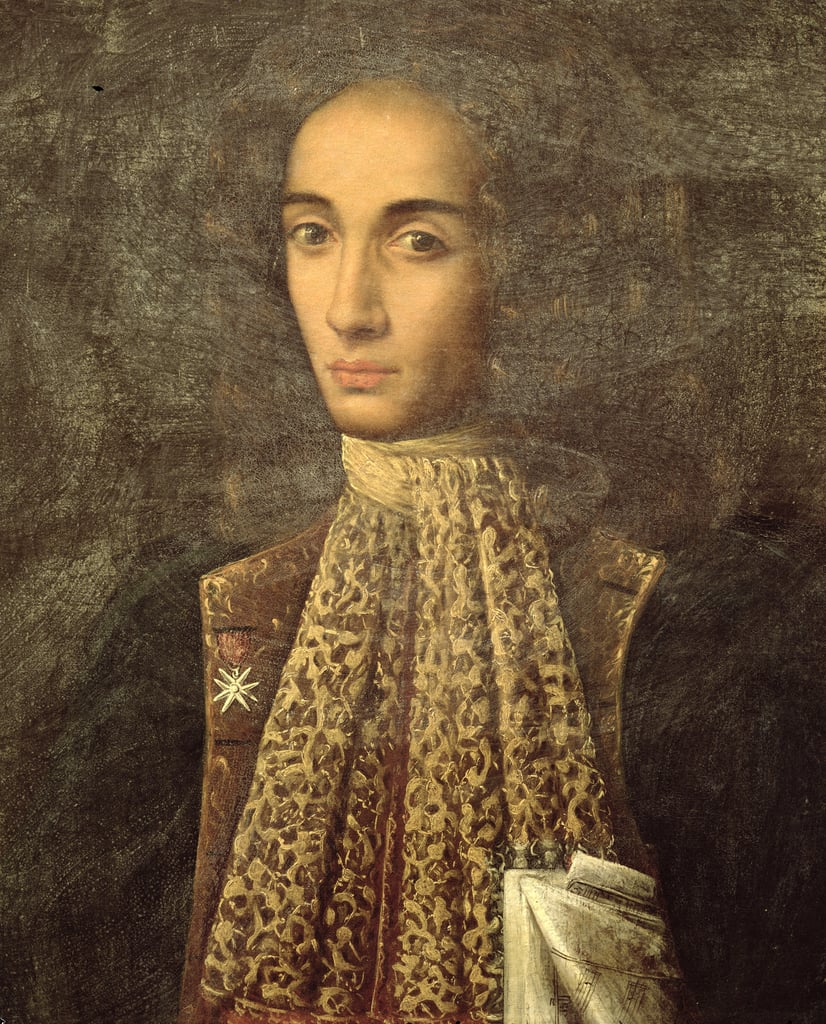
Scarlatti as a young man, attributed to Lorenzo Vaccaro (c1770)

Scarlatti's music forms a link between the early Baroque Italian vocal styles of the 17th century, with their centers in Florence, Venice and Rome, and the classical school of the 18th century. Scarlatti's style, however, is more than a transitional element in Western music; like most of his Naples colleagues he shows an understanding of the psychology of modulation and also frequently makes use of the ever-changing phrase lengths so typical of the Napoli school.

His early operas—Gli equivoci nel sembiante 1679; L'honestà negli amori 1680, containing the famous aria "Già il sole dal Gange"; Il Pompeo 1683, containing the well-known airs "O cessate di piagarmi" and "Toglietemi la vita ancor," and others down to about 1685—retain the older cadences in their recitatives, and a considerable variety of neatly constructed forms in their little arias, accompanied sometimes by the string quartet, sometimes with the continuo alone. By 1686, he had established the "Italian overture" form (second edition of Dal male il bene), and had abandoned the ground bass and the binary form air in two stanzas in favour of the ternary form or da capo type of air. His most prominent operas of this period are La Rosaura (1690, printed by the Gesellschaft für Musikforschung), and Pirro e Demetrio (1694), in which occur the arias "Le Violette", and "Ben ti sta, traditor".

From about 1697 onwards (La caduta del Decemviri), influenced partly perhaps by the style of Giovanni Bononcini and the taste of the viceregal court, his opera arias become more conventional in rhythm, with the oboes and trumpets being frequently used, and the violins often playing in unison. The operas composed for Ferdinando de' Medici are lost; they might have given a clearer idea of his style as his correspondence with the prince shows that they were composed with a very sincere sense of inspiration.

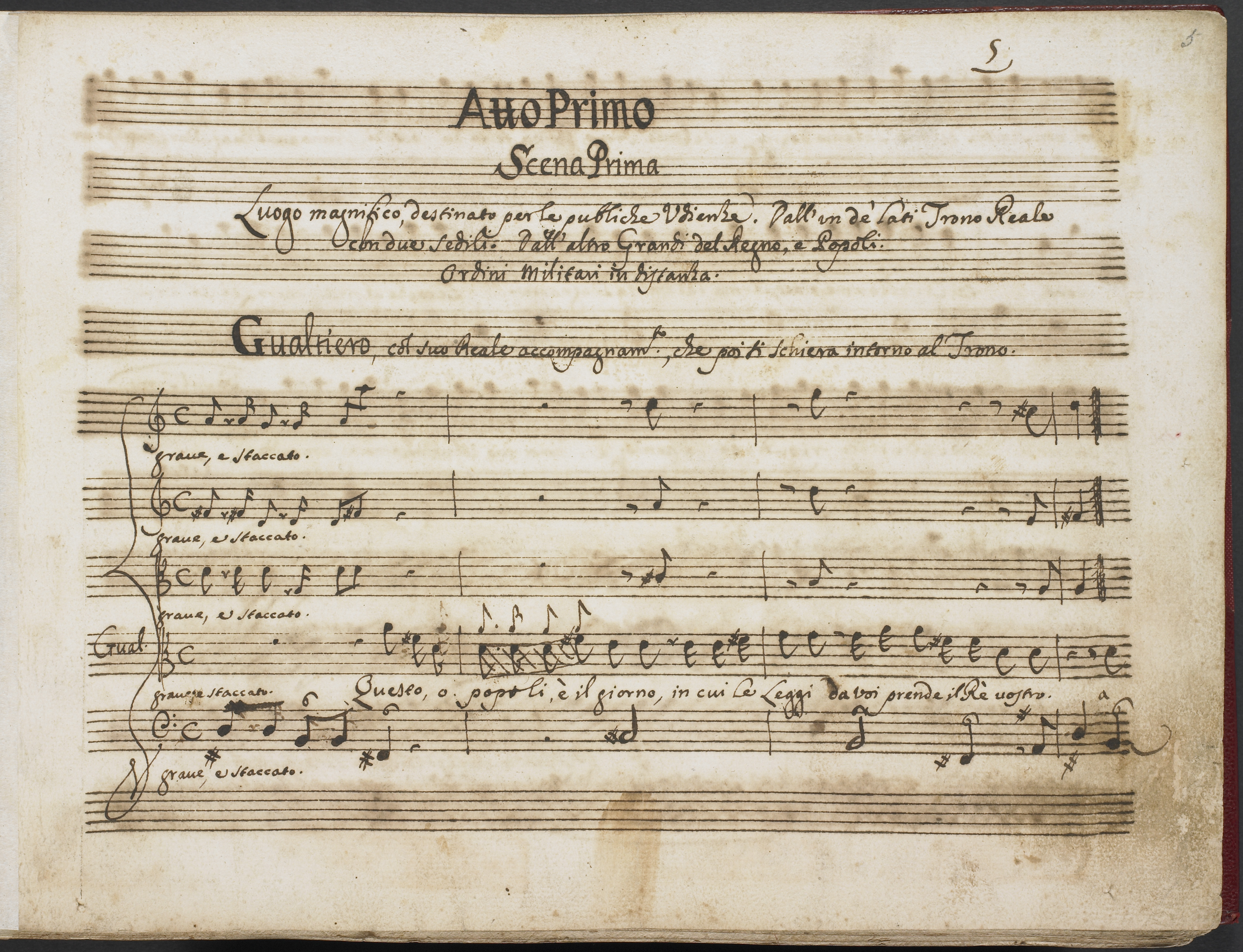
Autograph manuscript of Scarlatti's Griselda

Mitridate Eupatore is usually considered his masterpiece. The later Neapolitan operas (L'amor volubile e tiranno 1709; La principessa fedele 1710; Tigrane, 1714, &c.) are other well-known operas of his later period. In his Teodora (1697) he originated the use of the orchestral ritornello.

Toccata 3
Performed by Sylvia Kind on a harpsichord of the type made in the early 20th century

Besides the operas, oratorios (Agar et Ismaele esiliati, 1684; La Maddalena, 1685; La Giuditta, 1693; Humanita e Lucifero, 1704; Christmas Oratorio, c. 1705; Cain, overo Il primo omicidio, 1707; S. Filippo Neri, 1714; and others) and serenatas, which all exhibit a similar style, Scarlatti composed upwards of five hundred chamber-cantatas for solo voice. These remain almost entirely in manuscript and have not been published.

His few remaining Masses and church music in general are comparatively minor, except the great Saint Cecilia Mass (1721), which innovated a style of sacred music that was further developed by later composers such as Johann Sebastian Bach and Ludwig van Beethoven.

== Recordings ==
- Philharmonia Baroque Orchestra, Nicholas McGegan. (2016). La Gloria di Primavera. Philharmonia Baroque Orchestra. Diana Moore, Suzana Ograjensek, Nicholas Phan, Clint van der Linde, Douglas Williams, Philharmonia Chorale.
- Akademie für alte Musik Berlin, René Jacobs. (2007). Griselda. Harmonia Mundi HMC 901805.07. Dorothea Röschmann, Lawrence Zazzo, Veronica Cangemi, Bernarda Fink, Silvia Tro Santafé, Kobie van Rensburg.
- Le Consert de l'Hostel Dieu. (2006). Il martirio di Sant'Orsola. Ligia digital: 0202176–07
- Le parlement de musique. (2005). La Giuditta. Ambronay editions: AMY004
- Ensemble Europa Galante. (2004). Oratorio per la Santissima Trinità. Virgin Classics: 5 45666 2
- Academia Bizantina. (2004). Il Giardino di Rose. Decca: 470 650-2 DSA.
- Orqestra barocca di Sevilla . (2003). Colpa, Pentimento e Grazia. Harmonia Mundi: HMI 987045.46
- Seattle Baroque. (2001). Agar et Ismaele Esiliati. Centaur: CRC 2664
- Sedecia, re di Gerusalemme. 2000 . Gérard Lesne, Philippe Jaroussky, Virginie Pouchon, Mark Padmore, Peter Harvey, Il Seminario musicale. Virgin veritas, Erato
- Capella Palatina. (2000). Davidis pugna et victoria. Agora: AG 249.1
- Akademie für alte Musik Berlin, René Jacobs. (1998). Il Primo Omicidio. Harmonia Mundi Fr. Dorothea Röschmann, Graciela Oddone, Richard Croft, René Jacobs, Bernarda Fink, Antonio Abete
- Ensemble Europa Galante. (1995). Humanita e Lucifero. Opus 111: OPS 30–129
- Ensemble Europa Galante. (1993). La Maddalena. Opus 111: OPS 30–96
- Allesandro Stradella Consort. (1992). Cantata natalizia Abramo, il tuo sembiante. Nuova era: 7117
- I Musici. (1991). Concerto Grosso. Philips Classics Productions: 434 160–2
- I Musici. William Bennett (flute), Lenore Smith (flute), Bernard Soustrot (trumpet), Hans Elhorst (oboe). (1961). 12 Sinfonie di concerto grosso Philips Box 6769 066 [9500 959 & 9500 960 – 2 vinyl discs]
- Emma Kirkby, soprano and Daniel Taylor, countertenor, with the Theatre of Early Music. (2005). Stabat Mater. ATMA Classique: ACD2 2237
- Francis Colpron, recorder, with Les Boréades. (2007). Concertos for flute. ATMA Classique: ACD2 2521
- Nederlands Kamerkoor, with Harry van der Kamp, conductor. (2008). Vespro della Beata Vergine for 5 voices and continuo. ATMA Classique: ACD2 2533
