= Bernard Soustrot =

French trumpeter

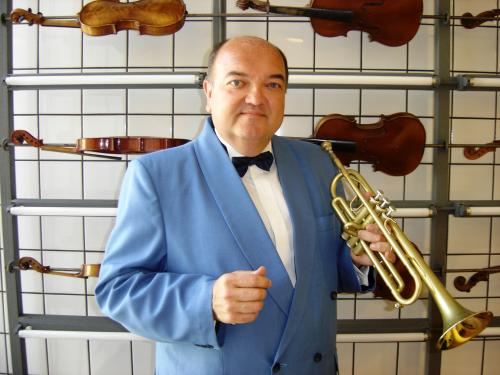
- Born: 3 September 1954 (age 72); Lyon, France
- Education: Conservatoire de Lyon; Conservatoire de Paris
- Occupations: Classical trumpeter; Music educator
- Organizations: Stuttgart Radio Symphony Orchestra; Orchestre philharmonique de Radio France
- Awards: Ordre des Arts et des Lettres

Bernard Soustrot (born 3 September 1954) is a French classical trumpeter. He is the brother of conductor Marc Soustrot.

== Biography ==
Born in Lyon, Soustrot entered the Conservatoire de Lyon at the age of 9, in classes of trumpet and cornet; four years later, he obtained a gold medal of trumpet, cornet and solfeggio. In 1970, he became a student of Maurice André at the Conservatoire de Paris. He was awarded various prizes, including in 1975 the first Trumpet Prize and won several renowned competitions, including Prague in 1974 and Geneva in 1975. In 1976 he won the first prize in the Maurice André contest.

He began his career in 1975 as a solo trumpeter in the Stuttgart Radio Symphony Orchestra under the direction of Sergiu Celibidache, then in 1976 at the Orchestre philharmonique de Radio France under the direction of Gilbert Amy.

1981 marks the beginning of his career as an international soloist, often associated with a pipe organ. He has been regularly working with Jean Dekyndt, director of the Conservatoire de Toulouse since 1979, and François-Henri Houbart. He has collaborated with notable conductors such as Karl Münchinger, Seiji Ozawa and Karl Richter.

Happy in his art, he tries to share it through master classes. He created competitions like Prestige de la trompette de Guebwiller, or Concours international de quintettes de cuivres de Narbonne. He was a professor at the Conservatoire de Boulogne-Billancourt and that of Perpignan from 1998 to 2016.

Since 2015, he has been artistic director of the Occitania chamber Orchestra.

He was made a chevalier of the Ordre des Arts et des Lettres in 2011.
