= Il Xerse =

Italian opera by Francesco Cavalli

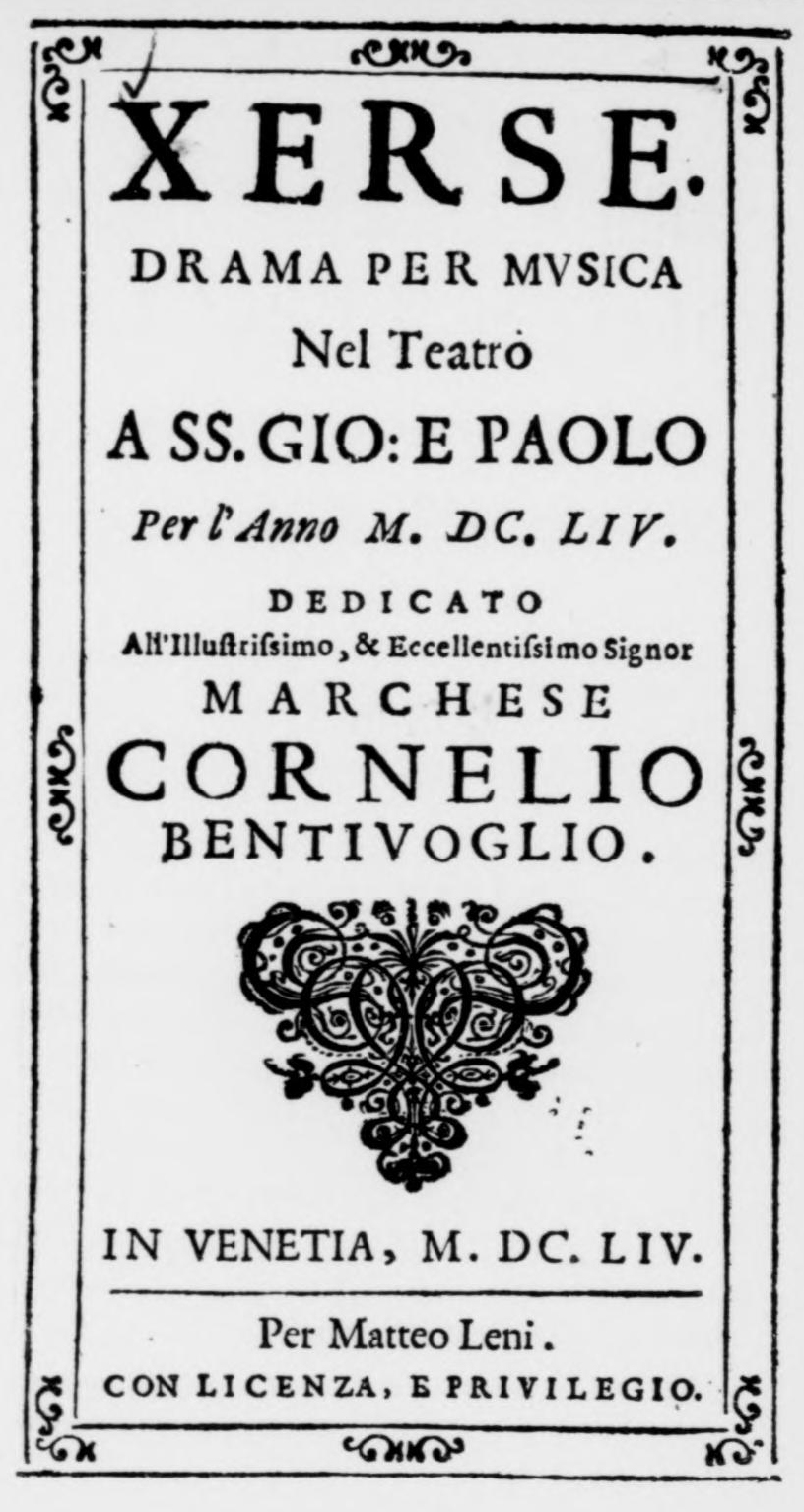
Title page of the original libretto

Il Xerse, usually written Xerse (English: Xerxes; French: Xerxès), is an Italian opera by Francesco Cavalli (specifically, a dramma per musica) about Xerxes I. The libretto was written by Nicolò Minato and was later set by both Giovanni Bononcini (Xerse, 1694) and George Frideric Handel (Serse, 1738). Minato's plot outline is loosely based on Book 7 of Herodotus's Histories. The opera, consisting of a prologue and three acts, was composed in 1654 and first performed on 12 January 1655 at the Teatro SS. Giovanni e Paolo in Venice. It was dedicated to the Ferrarese nobleman Marchese Cornelio Bentivoglio.

== Background ==
Although Nicolò Minato took the framework of his libretto from the seventh book of Herodotus's Histories, as translated into Italian by Matteo Maria Boiardo in the 15th century, the plot is actually based on a 1651 comedy by Raffaele Tauro, L'ingelosite speranze, which in turn was an Italian adaptation of Lope de Vega's 1625 Spanish comedy Lo cierto por lo dudoso.

The premiere at Venice was probably conducted by Cavalli from the keyboard. The opera was highly popular in Italy: at least nine different revivals were given there while Cavalli lived.

In 1660 Cavalli was persuaded to travel to France to produce a new opera for the wedding of Louis XIV in Paris. He soon became entangled in court intrigue which ensured that the projected opera, Ercole amante, was not ready in time and had to be replaced by a revival of Xerse at the last minute. Xerse was given with ballets by Cavalli's rival Jean-Baptiste Lully, who had become the official court composer in France. The whole spectacle lasted eight or nine hours and the French audience had little appreciation for an opera in a foreign language, preferring Lully's dance music.

The opera was performed in many different versions. In its Paris form, apart from having the additional ballet suites, the plot was rewritten to make it more congenial to the court, including the enhancement of Xerse himself to a more kingly role comparable to the status of the King of France - which necessitated a change of the register of the part, originally written for a castrato, to a baritone. Many of the recitatives were also rewritten. Surviving manuscripts including Cavalli's own annotations from performances of Xerse in Venice, Genoa, Naples and Bologna clearly demonstrate that he often amended, cut, and reorganized material as each production was being prepared.

The first act begins with the well-known aria "Ombra mai fu" ("There was never a shadow"). According to Martha Novak Clinkscale, Handel's later, more famous setting "is neither more poignant nor mellifluous than Cavalli's".

== Roles ==
Roles, voice types
Role	Voice type
Xerse, King of Persia	alto
Amastre, eventually his wife, daughter of the King of Susia, disguised as a man	soprano
Arsamene, brother of Xerse	alto
Romilda, daughter of Ariodate, sister of Adelanta	soprano
Adelanta, daughter of Ariodate, sister of Romilda	soprano
Ariodate, Prince of Abydos, Xerse's vassal	tenor
Eumene, Xerse's favourite eunuch and his field marshal	soprano
Aristone, noble of Susa, old guardian of Amastre	bass
Periarco, ambassador of Ottane, King of Susia	alto
Elviro, servant of Arsamene	alto
Clito, page of Romilda	soprano
Sesostre, magician	tenor
Scitalce, magician	bass
Capitano, captain of Xerse's guards	bass
Chorus: Persians in Xerse's guard, Romilda's ladies-in-waiting, Ariodate's soliers, Periarco's pages, spirits guarding the plane tree, sailors of the ships on the Hellespont, Indians in Xerse's militia, Greeks in Xerse's militia

== Editions ==
Martha Novak Clinkscale included a modern transcription of the full score in the second volume of her Ph.D. thesis ("Pier Francesco Cavalli's Xerse") at the University of Minnesota, 1970. René Jacobs used Clinkscale's edition as the starting point for his version, performed at the Bordeaux Festival in May 1985 and issued on four LPs. The two surviving Italian manuscript scores both lack the music of the prologue, so Jacobs added the prologue from Cavalli's 1654 opera Il Ciro. The ballet music marked in the printed librettos is also absent, so he added short sinfonie by Cavalli and contemporaries to introduce acts and several important scenes and for changes of scenery. He also added from the Paris version an aria for Aristone ("Con tuoi vezzi lusinghieri") and a duo for Romilda and Arsamene in act 3 ("Arsemene mio bene..."). In addition, he cast the role of Eumene with Guy de Mey, a tenor, which required transposing his music down an octave. The manuscript scores "offer no more than a kind of sketch of what should actually be played", so Jacobs realized parts and added other instruments, such as two recorders, which probably were not used in Venice at the time, and used a basso continuo group of two harpsichords, theorbo, baroque guitar and chamber organ. Lionel Salter was not convinced of the authenticity of guitars in Ariodate's first entry aria.

The Centre de Musique Baroque de Versailles with Bärenreiter produced an edition of the 1660 Paris version, edited by Barbara Nestola, in 2015. This version was the basis for a staged production by Le Concert d’Astrée under Emmanuelle Haïm, performed at the Opéra de Lille in October 2015 and the Théâtre de Caen in January 2016. It was also presented at the Theater an der Wien in Vienna on 18 October 2016.

A critical edition of the 1655 version by Sara Elisa Stangalino and Hendrik Schulze made in 2019 was the basis for a performance as part of the Festival della Valle d'Itria in Martina Franca in 2022, conducted by Federico Maria Sardelli and staged by Leo Muscato with the Italian countertenor Carlo Vistoli in the title role.

Another new edition of the Paris version was prepared by Marcio da Silva for a concert performance at the Cockpit Theatre, London in 2021, although the title role was sung by a countertenor rather than a baritone, and the ballets were omitted.

== Recordings ==
- 1985: Xerse, René Jacobs (Xerse), Judith Nelson (Amastre), Jeffrey Gall (Arsamene), Isabelle Poulenard (Romilda), Jill Feldman (Adelanta), John Elwes (Ariodate), Guy de Mey (Eumene), Dominique Visse (Elviro), Concerto Vocale, conducted by René Jacobs (4 CDs, Harmonia Mundi, 1985)
- 2022: Il Xerse (video), Carlo Vistoli (Xerse), Ekaterina Protsenko (Amastre), Gaia Petrone (Arsamene), Carolina Lippo (Romilda), Dioklea Hoxha (Adelanta), Carlo Allemano (Ariodate), Orchestra Barocca Modo Antiquo, conducted by Federico Maria Sardelli, recorded live, July 2022, Valle d'Itria Festival, Teatro Verdi, Martina Franca (Blu-ray, Dynamic, 2023)
