= Se tu della mia morte =

Aria by Alessandro Scarlatti

Aria
- Language: Italian
- English title: If you of my death
- Written: 1697
- Published: 1886
- Genre: Opera
- Composer: Alessandro Scarlatti
- Lyricist: Silvio Stampiglia

"Se tu della mia morte" ("If you of my death") is an aria from act 3 of Alessandro Scarlatti's 1697 opera La caduta de' Decemviri (The Fall of the Decemviri) to a libretto by Silvio Stampiglia.

The da capo aria in G minor is accompanied only by a basso continuo. Its time signature is 12/8 to a tempo of andante and it is 24 bars long. The vocal range for a castrato soprano is from D_{4} to F_{5}. It has been transposed to various keys for different voice types.

The aria gained popularity as a concert aria when it appeared in 1886 in the collection Arie antiche by Alessandro Parisotti, published by Casa Ricordi in Milan.

== Lyrics ==
Appio Claudio has just attempted suicide, but Valeria, who loves him despite his rejection, has prevented it. "If I cannot die by my own hand, may your eyes kill me."

Se tu della mia morte
a questa destra forte
la gloria non vuoi dar,
dalla a'tuoi lumi.

E il dardo del tuo sguardo
sia quello che m'uccida
e mi consumi.

Would'st thou the boast of ending
a life and love of feuding
deny to this right hand,
grant it to thine own eyes.

As lances keen, thy glances
be swift and sure in slaying
a heart they so despise.
