= Xerse (Bononcini) =

Opera by Giovanni Bononcini

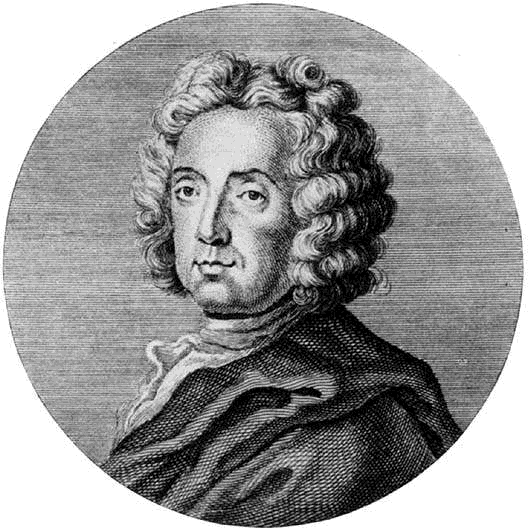
Giovanni Bononcini

Xerse (Xerxes) is an opera in three acts by Giovanni Bononcini. It was designated as a dramma per musica. The libretto was written by Silvio Stampiglia after that by Nicolò Minato which had been used for the 1654 opera of the same name by Francesco Cavalli. Stampiglia's version was in turn used as the basis for Handel's Serse.

Stampiglia's version keeps to the story used by Minato but there are major differences in the way the work as a whole is structured.

== Performance history ==
The opera was first performed in Rome at the Teatro di Tor di Nona on 25 January 1694.

== Roles ==
Roles, voice types
Role	Voice type	Premiere cast, 25 January 1694
Xerse	soprano castrato	Nicolò Paris 'Nicolino'
Romilda	soprano castrato	Antonio Romolo Ferrini
Adelanta	soprano castrato	Rinaldo Gherardini
Arsamene	alto castrato	Francesco Antonio Pistocchi
Amastre	alto castrato	Luigi Albarelli
Elviro	soprano castrato	Carlo Antonio Corno
Eumene	alto castrato	Benedetto Cini
Aristone	tenor	Pietro Paolo Alberti
Clito	tenor	Giuseppe Trivelli
Ariodate	bass	Matteo de Grandis
