= Ciro (opera) =

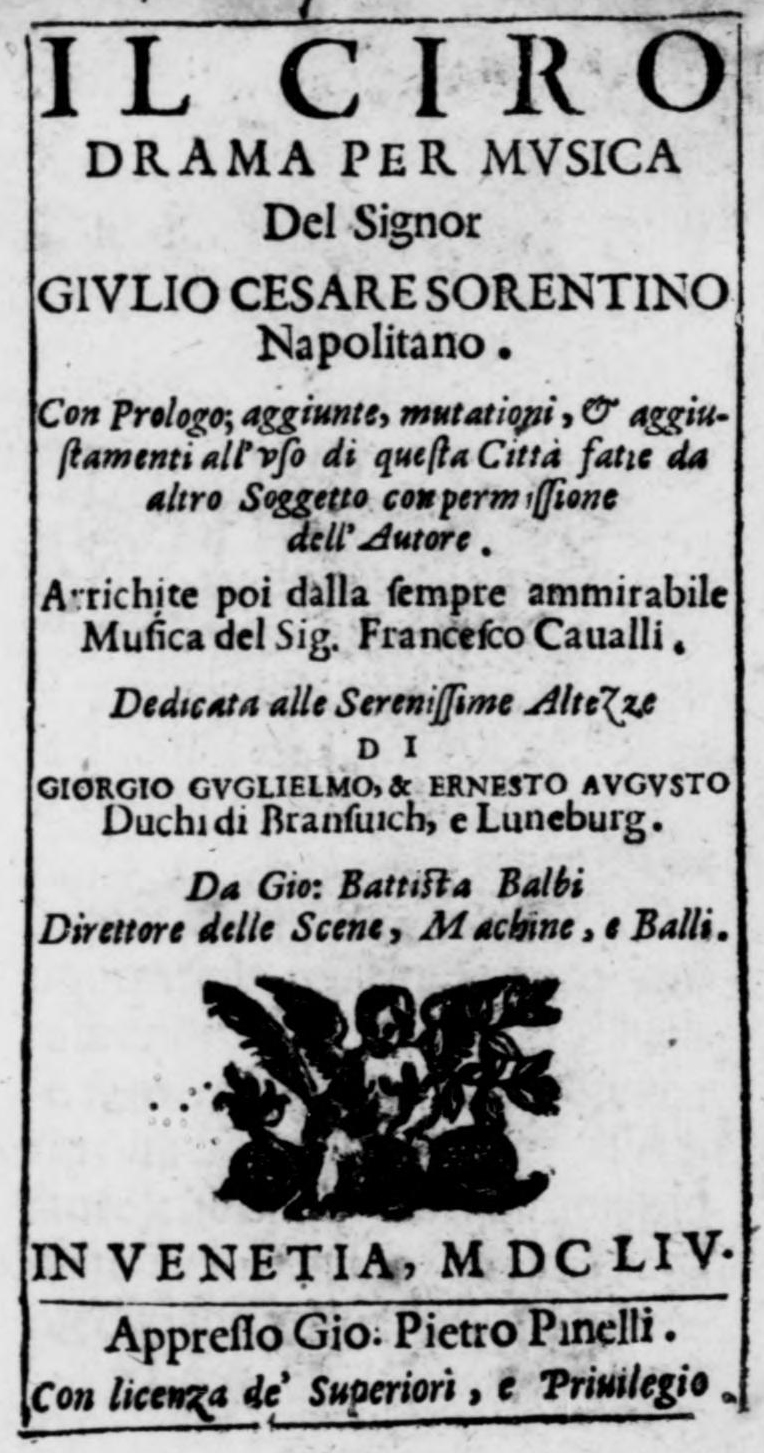
Title page of the 1654 Venetian libretto

Ciro (Cyrus), also written Il Ciro, is a 1653 Italian drama per musica (opera) in a prologue and three acts with music by Francesco Provenzale and a libretto by Giulio Cesare Sorrentino. The story concerns the Persian king Cyrus the Great. The opera was probably first performed during Carnival of that year at the Teatro San Bartolomeo in Naples, in a production by Giovan Battista Balbi (fl 1636–1657).

The opera was performed again in a revised version at the Teatro San Giovanni e San Paolo in Venice, beginning on 30 January 1654 or 4 February 1654. The libretto credits Sorrentino as the librettist, Francesco Cavalli with revising and adding music and Balbi for the scenery, machines, and dances. Balbi also signed the libretto's introduction. The Venetian poet who, with Sorrentino's permission, revised the text to make it more suitable for presentation in that city is not named, but may have been Aurelio Aureli or Balbi. The opera was revived again in 1665 in Venice with additional music by Andrea Mattioli. Manuscript scores of the 1654 and 1665 versions survive.

The new prologue of the 1654 version in Venice included spectacular scenic effects and must have been regarded as successful, since it was used for other works by Cavalli, including Erismena in 1655 and a revival of Giasone in 1666. In modern times, René Jacobs used it for his 1985 recording of Cavalli's Xerse (for which the music of the original prologue has not been found).
