= Marilyn Tyler =

American soprano

Marilyn Tyler (born Marilyn Teitler; December 5, 1926 – December 20, 2017) was an American soprano and music pedagogue.

Of Romanian Jewish descent, Tyler was born in Brooklyn, New York to a family that contained many performers, including singers, dancers, musicians, actors and clowns. She studied music at the Manhattan School of Music, and was twice a recipient of Fulbright Scholarships.

Over her professional career, Tyler sang over seventy opera roles in eight languages. Her notable roles included Constanza in The Abduction from the Seraglio at Rome Opera, Violetta in La traviata with the Royal Nederlands Opera. Her particular performance as Susanna in Le nozze di Figaro at the Holland Festival, with Elisabeth Schwarzkopf (the Countess), Hermann Prey (Figaro), and Eberhard Wächter (the Count) in the cast, revived her European career, as she stepped into the role on only a few hours' notice. She created numerous roles in world premiere operas, such as Die Schwarze Spinne by Josef Matthias Hauer, Martin Korda by Henk Badings, and Raskolnikoff by Heinrich Sütermeister, to name a few. She received favourable comments for her performance as Atlanta in the 1965 recording of Handel's Serse, remastered and released by Deutsche Grammophon:

'Marilyn Tyler is superb as Romilda's sister Atalanta, her dusky soprano providing a clear contrast to Popp's gleaming tone, and she exhibits an impressive range up to a brilliantly finessed high D in the final cadenza of "Voi mi dite."

In the late 1970s, Tyler moved to Tehran, Iran to direct for the Iran Opera, a Western-style opera company created by Empress Farah Diba. After the Iranian Revolution of 1979, she remained in Iran for nine months before escaping into Pakistan. There, she became the director of the U.S. Information Service's Pakistan-American Cultural Center in Karachi. Tyler remained there for two years until the US Embassy in Karachi was attacked.

Tyler returned to the U.S. and taught for two years at Jacksonville University in Florida. She subsequently became director of opera studies at the University of New Mexico. Tyler retired in 2011 from the university but continued to teach privately. Tyler died in New Mexico on December 20, 2017, aged 91. She left no immediate survivors.
