= Carlo Agostino Badia =

Italian composer

Carlo Agostino Badia (1672 – 23 September 1738) was an Italian court composer best known for his operas and oratorios. Badia was born in Verona and around 1697 moved to Vienna, where many of his operas were premiered until his death. He was employed as chapel-master to emperor Leopold I for some time.

== Operas ==
- La ninfa Apollo (1692, Rome and Milan)
- Amor che vince lo sdegno, ovvero Olimpia placata (1692)
- La Rosaura, ovvero Amore figlio della gratitudine (1692, Innsbruck)
- L'amazone corsara, ovvero L'Alvilda, regina de' Goti (1692)
- Bacco, vincitore dell'India (1697, Vienna)
- La pace tra i numi discordi nella rovina di Troia (1697, Vienna)
- L'idea del felice governo (1698, Vienna)
- Lo squittinio dell'eroe (1698, Neue Favorita)
- Imeneo trionfante (1699, Vienna)
- Il Narciso (1699, Laxenburg)
- Il commun giubilo del mondo (1699, Neue Favorita)
- Cupido fuggitivo da Venere e ritrovato a' piedi della Sacra Reale Maestà d'Amalia (1700, Vienna)
- Le gare dei beni (1700, Vienna)
- Diana rappacificata con Venere e con Amore (1700, Vienna)
- La costanza d'Ulisse (1700, Neue Favorita)
- L'amore vuol somiglianza (1702, Vienna)
- L'Arianna (1702, Vienna)
- Il Telemaco, ovvero Il valore coronato (1702, Vienna)
- La concordia della Virtù e della Fortuna (1702, Neue Favorita)
- Enea negli Elisei (1702, Vienna)
- La Psiche (1703, Vienna)
- Napoli ritornata ai Romani (1707, Neue Favorita)
- Ercole, vincitore di Gerione (1708, Vienna)
- Gli amori di Circe con Ulisse (1709, Dresden)
- Il bel genio dell'Austria ed il Fato (1723, Vienna)
