= Silvio Stampiglia =

Italian poet and writer

Silvio Stampiglia (14 March 1664 – 27 January 1725) was an Italian poet, librettist, and founder member of the Accademia dell'Arcadia under the pen name of Palemone Licurio. Numerous Italian composers set his libretti to music, particularly Carlo Agostino Badia and Giovanni Bononcini.

== Life ==
Stampiglia was born in Civita Lavinia, and died in Naples.

== Works ==
=== Libretti ===
Operas

- Eraclea, o vero Il ratto delle Sabine (pasticcio; set by Giovanni Bononcini, 1692)
- Xerse (set by Giovanni Bononcini, 1694)
- Tullo Ostilio (Giovanni Bononcini, 1694)
- Muzio Scevola (Giovanni Bononcini, 1695)
- Il trionfo di Camilla regina de Volsci (set by Giovanni Bononcini, 1696) - one of Bononcini and Stampiglia's greatest successes.
- La caduta dei Decemviri (set by Francesco Ballarotti, 1699; and Gaetano Andreozzi as Virginia, 1787)
- Turno Aricino (set by Giuseppe Antonio Vincenzo Aldrovandini, 1702)
- L'incoronazione di Dario (set by Giuseppe Antonio Vincenzo Aldrovandini, 1705)
- Etearco (Giovanni Bononcini, 1707)
- Turno Aricino (Giovanni Bononcini, 1707)
- Mario fuggitivo (Giovanni Bononcini, 1708)
- Abdolomino (Giovanni Bononcini, 1709)
- La Partenope (set by Giuseppe Boniventi, 1709)
- Caio Gracco (Giovanni Bononcini, 1710)

Serenatas

- La nemica d'Amore (set by Giovanni Bononcini, 1692)
- La nemica d'Amore fatta amante (set by Giovanni Bononcini, 1693)
- La costanza non gradita nel doppio amore d'Aminta (Giovanni Bononcini, 1694)
- La notte festiva (Giovanni Bononcini, 1695)
- Amore non vuol diffidenza (Giovanni Bononcini, 1695)
- Amor per amore (Giovanni Bononcini, 1696)
- La gara delle antiche eroine ne' campi Elisi (set by Attilio Ariosti, 1707
- Endimione favola per musica (Giovanni Bononcini, 1706)

Componimenti

- Napoli ritornata ai romani (set by Carlo Agostino Badia, 1707)
- Il natale di Giunone festeggiato in Samo (set by Giovanni Bononcini, 1708)
- La presa di Tebe (set by Bononcini's brother Antonio Maria Bononcini, 1708)
- Li sagrifici di Romolo per la salute di Roma (Giovanni Bononcini, 1708)
- L'arrivo della gran madre degli dei in Roma (Giovanni Bononcini, 1713)

Oratorio Music survives for five of the oratorios:

- Il martirio di' S. Adriano (set by Francesco Antonio Pistocchi, 1692)
- San Nicola di Bari (set by Giovanni Bononcini, 1693)
- Il pentimento di Davide (set by Carlo Agostino Badia, 1708)
- Il martirio de' Maccabei (set by Carlo Agostino Badia, 1709)
- La Giuditta (set by Carlo Agostino Badia, 1710)
- L’interciso (set by Antonio Maria Bononcini, 1711)

Adapted from the listing at Italian Wikipedia
