= Giovanni Bononcini =

Italian composer (1670–1747)

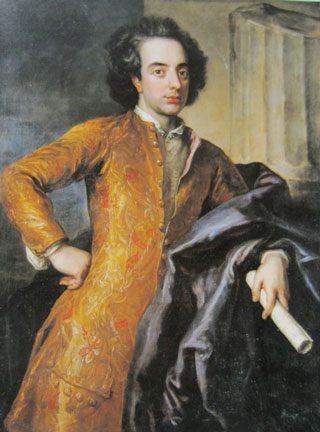
- Born: 18 July 1670; Modena, Italy
- Died: 9 July 1747 (aged 76) unknown
- Occupations: Composer; Cellist

Giovanni Bononcini (or Buononcini) (18 July 1670 – 9 July 1747) (sometimes cited also as Giovanni Battista Bononcini) was an Italian Baroque composer, cellist, singer and teacher, one of a family of string players and composers. He was a rival to George Frederic Handel.

== Biography ==
=== Early years ===
Bononcini was born in Modena, Duchy of Modena and Reggio, the oldest of three sons. His father, Giovanni Maria Bononcini, was a violinist and a composer, and his younger brother, Antonio Maria Bononcini, was also a composer. An orphan from the age of 8, Giovanni Battista studied in the music school of Giovanni Paolo Colonna at San Petronio Basilica in Bologna (perhaps in 1680 or 1681).

In 1685, at the age of 15, he published three collections of instrumental works (in two of which he gave his age as 13). On 30 May 1686, he was accepted as a member of the prestigious Accademia Filarmonica di Bologna. His services were already much in demand: he worked at San Petronio as a string player and singer, published further collections of instrumental pieces, and produced two oratorios for performance in Bologna and Modena. From 1687 to 1691 he served as maestro di cappella at the church of San Giovanni in Monte in Bologna, for which he composed a set of masses for double choir which were published in 1688 as his Op. 7. In 1690 he composed a further oratorio for Modena. He also spent some time in Milan in 1689 and 1690. In 1691 he dedicated a set of vocal duets (Op. 8) to Emperor Leopold I and played in the orchestra of the Cardinal Legate of Bologna, Benedetto Pamphili.

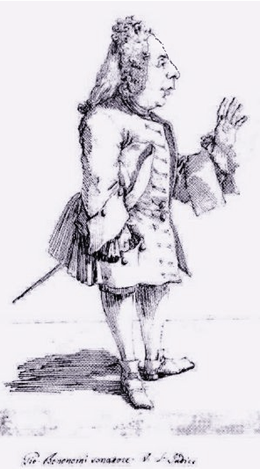
Caricature of the composer by Pier Leone Ghezzi

=== Rome ===
In the same year, he moved to Rome, where he entered the service of Filippo II Colonna, a powerful patron of the arts, for whom Bononcini, along with Colonna's librettist, Silvio Stampiglia, produced six serenatas, an oratorio and three (possibly five) operas between 1692 and 1696, including the highly successful Xerse (1694). Another successful opera, Il trionfo di Camilla was produced in Naples (in 1696 or 1697) following the appointment of Colonna's brother-in-law, Luis de la Cerda, as Spain's local viceroy. Between 1695 and 1696, Bononcini was made a member of two of Rome's most exclusive artistic circles, the musical Accademia Nazionale di Santa Cecilia and the literary Accademia degli Arcadi (in which he was one of seven musicians proposed as founding members of a "chorus" or performance arm). Around this time, the eclectic musician and poet Giuseppe Valentini wrote a sonnet in praise of Bononcini's teaching abilities.

=== Vienna and Berlin ===
Following the death of Colonna's wife Lorenza in August 1697, Bononcini left Rome for Vienna, where he entered the service of Emperor Leopold I with a large salary and also established himself as the favoured composer of Leopold's heir and successor, Joseph. In 1702, following the outbreak of the War of the Spanish Succession, Bononcini moved to the court of Queen Sophia Charlotte in Berlin, where he became the queen's favourite composer and broadened his public reputation with a production of a new opera, Polifemo (he also composed Cefalo there).

Although his activities in the next decade are less well documented, he appears to have been in Venice for the production of a new opera during the carnival of 1706. By this time Bononcini had an enviable international reputation: in the words of his fellow composer Francesco Geminiani, Camilla had "astonished the musical world by its departure from the dry, flat melody to which their ears had until then been accustomed". By 1710, productions of Camilla (presumably based on Bononcini's version) had reached London as well as many cities across Italy. At some time during this decade on one of his sojourns to Italy, he married Margherita Balletti. She came from a family of actors and commedia dell'arte players and was the sister-in-law of Luigi Riccoboni.

=== London ===
From 1720 to 1732 he was in London, where for a time his popularity rivalled George Frideric Handel's, who had arrived in London in 1712. The Tories favoured Handel, while the Whig party favoured Bononcini. Their competition inspired the epigram by John Byrom that made the phrase "Tweedledum and Tweedledee" famous. Handel steadily gained the ascendancy, and Bononcini became a pensioner of the Duchess of Marlborough, who had led his admirers. Bononcini left London after charges of plagiarism were proven against him: he had palmed off a madrigal by Antonio Lotti as his own work.

=== Final years ===
After leaving London in 1733, Bononcini travelled to France in the company of an adventurer, Count Ughi, who swindled him out of most of his property. In Paris, Bononcini gave concerts of his religious music at the Concert Spirituel and then moved on to Lisbon to become the cello teacher to the Portuguese king. In 1736 he returned to Vienna, where his opera Alessandro in Sidone and his oratorio Ezechia were performed in 1737. In dire financial straits by 1742, he petitioned Maria Theresa of Austria for help. In October of that year, she granted him a pension of 50 florins a month in recognition of his past service to the court. Bononcini died on 9 July 1747, allegedly in Vienna, impoverished and largely forgotten. After his death, his last major composition, a Te Deum which he had composed in 1741 for Francis I, was performed in celebration of the Treaty of Aix-la-Chapelle.

== Compositions ==
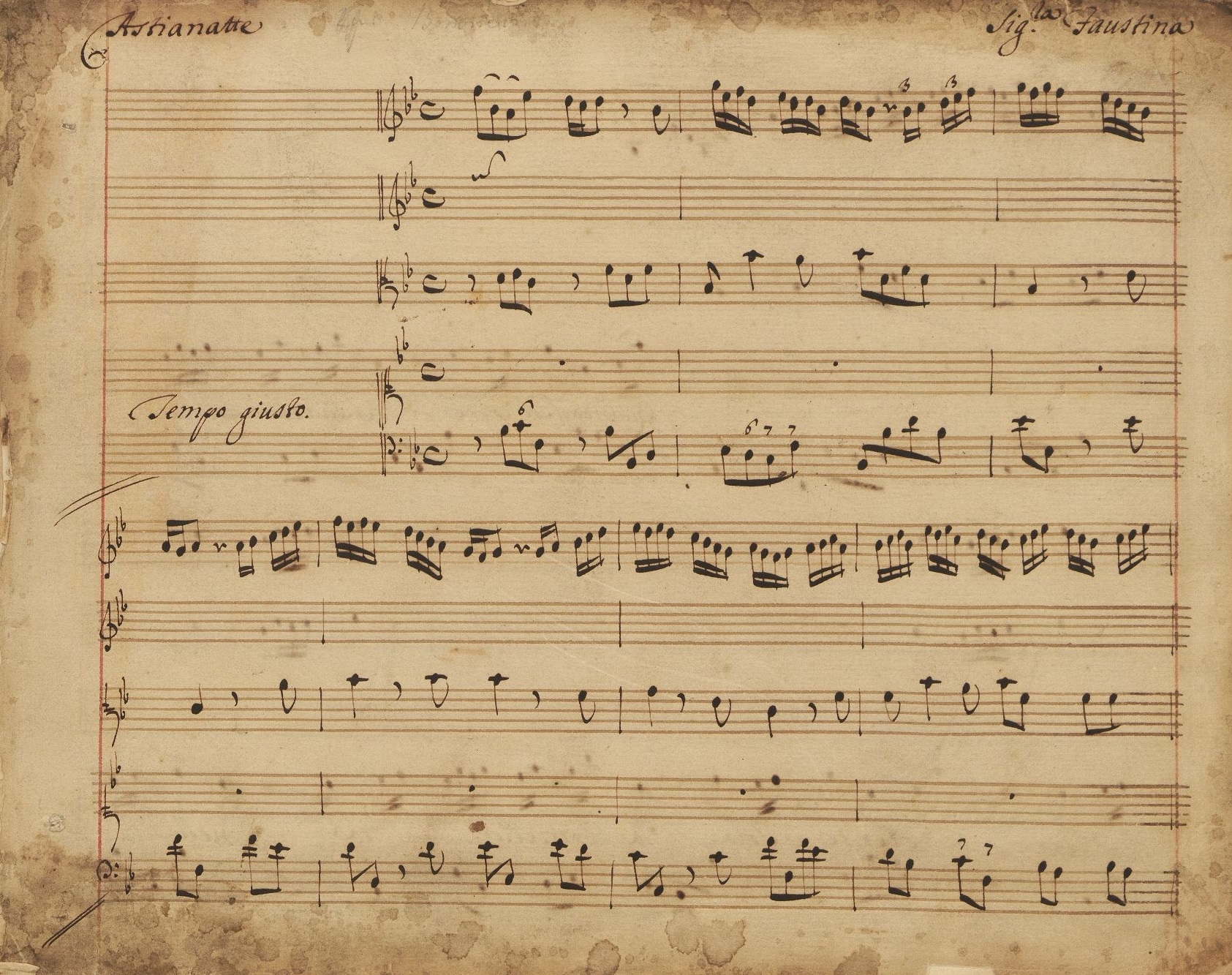
First page of manuscript from Astianatte, ca. 1727

His earliest works for the cello are two Sinfonie included in a manuscript in the abbey of Montecassino. His other works include a number of operas, masses, and a funeral anthem for the Duke of Marlborough. One of his operas, Xerse, parodied material in an earlier setting of that opera by Francesco Cavalli, including the aria "Ombra mai fu". Bononcini's Xerse was in turn adapted by Handel in his Serse with a third (and best known) version of "Ombra mai fu". Bononcini's song "Vado ben spesso cangiando loco" was used by Franz Liszt in his suite for piano Années de pèlerinage: Deuxième année: Italie under the erroneous title "Canzonetta del Salvator Rosa".

== Operas ==
- Eraclea pasticcio (1692)
- Xerse (1694)
- Tullo Ostillio (1694)
- Muzio Scevola (1695)
- Il trionfo di Camilla (1696)
- L'amore eroica fra pastori (1696)
- La clemenza di Augusto (1697)
- La fede pubblica (1699)
- Gli affetti più grandi, vinti dal più giusto (1701)
- Cefalo (1702)
- Polifemo (1702)
- Proteo sul Reno, poemetto dramattico (1703)
- Etearco (1707)
- Turno Aricino (1707)
- Mario fuggitivo (1708)
- Abdolomino (1709)
- Caio Gracco (1710)
- Astarto (1720)
- L'odio e l'amore (1721)
- Crispo (1721)
- Griselda (1722)
- Erminia (1723)
- Calphurnia (1724)
- Astianatte (1727)
- Alessandro in Sidone (1737)
- Zenobia (1737)

== Serenatas ==
- La nemica d'Amore (1692)
- La nemica d'amore fatta amante (August 10, 1693)
- La costanza non gradita nel doppio amore d'Aminta (1694)
- La notte festiva (1695)
- Amore non vuol diffidenza (1695)
- Amor per amore (1696)
- L'Euleo festeggiante (1699)
- La gara delle quatri stagioni festa in musica (1699)
- Il fiore delle Eroine Trattenimento in musica (1704)
- Il ritorno di Guilio Cesare festa in musica (1704)
- La nuova gara di Giunione e Pallade festa in musica (1705)
- Endimione favola per musica (1706)

== Other works ==
- XII Trattenimenti da camera, Op. 1 (1685)
- XII Concerti da camera, Op. 2 (1685)
- Sinfonias, Opp. 3–6
- 4 Messe brevi (1688)
- XII Duetti da camera, Op. 8 (1691)
- Oratorio San Nicola di Bari (Rome 1693)
- Oratorio La Conversione di Maddalena (Vienna 1701)
- Il natale di Giunone festeggiato in Samo (1708)
- Li sagrifici di Romolo per la salute di Roma (1708)
- L'arrivo della gran madre degli dei in Roma (1713)
- Divertimenti da camera (1722)
- XII (Trio) Sonatas for the Chamber (1732)
- Oratorio Ezechia (Vienna 1737)
- Te Deum in C minor (1741)
- Over 300 cantatas
