= Ombra mai fu =

Opening aria from George Frideric Handel's Serse

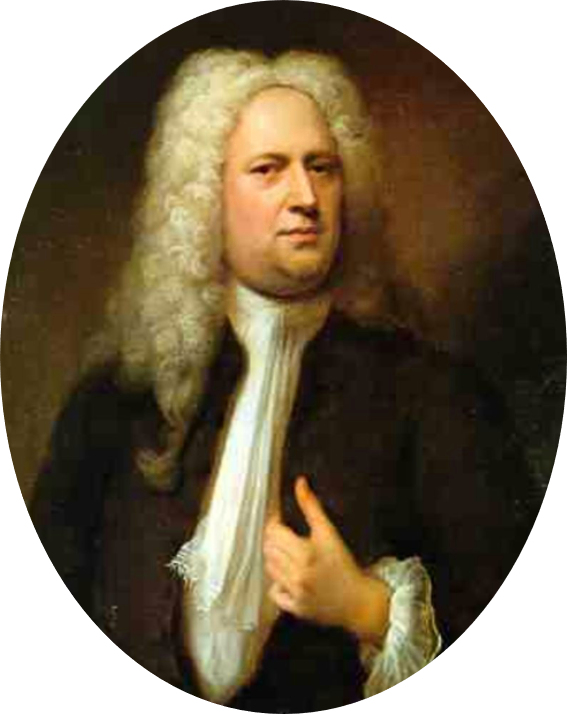
Portrait of George Frideric Handel by Balthasar Denner, 1733

"Ombra mai fu" ("Never was a shade…"), also known as "Largo from Xerxes" or "Handel's Largo", is the opening aria from the opera Serse (1738) by George Frideric Handel.

== Context ==
The opera was a commercial failure, lasting only five performances in London after its premiere. In the 19th century, however, the aria was rediscovered and became one of Handel's best-known pieces. Handel adapted the aria from the setting by Giovanni Bononcini, who, in turn, adapted it from the setting by Francesco Cavalli. All three composers had produced settings of the same opera libretto by Nicolò Minato.

== Music ==
"Frondi tenere e belle ... Ombra mai fu"
Enrico Caruso, 1920 (sung in the tenor register)

Originally composed to be sung by a soprano castrato (and typically sung in modern performances of Serse by a countertenor, contralto or a mezzo-soprano; sometimes even by a tenor or high baritone an octave below), it has been arranged for other voice types and instruments, including solo organ, solo piano, violin or cello and piano, and string ensembles, often under the title "Largo from Xerxes" or (as in Thornton Wilder's Our Town) simply "Handel's Largo", although the original tempo is marked larghetto. It has been used by Handel himself as the main theme of the third movement (larguetto) of the so called "concerto pasticcio" in D dur for oboe.

In the opera, the aria is preceded by a short recitativo accompagnato of 9 bars, setting the scene ("Frondi tenere e belle"). The aria itself is also short; it consists of 52 bars and typically lasts three to four minutes.

The instrumentation is for a string section: first and second violins, viola, and basses. The key signature is F major, the time signature is 3/4 time. The vocal range covers C_{4} to F_{5} with a tessitura from F_{4} to F_{5}.

== Libretto ==
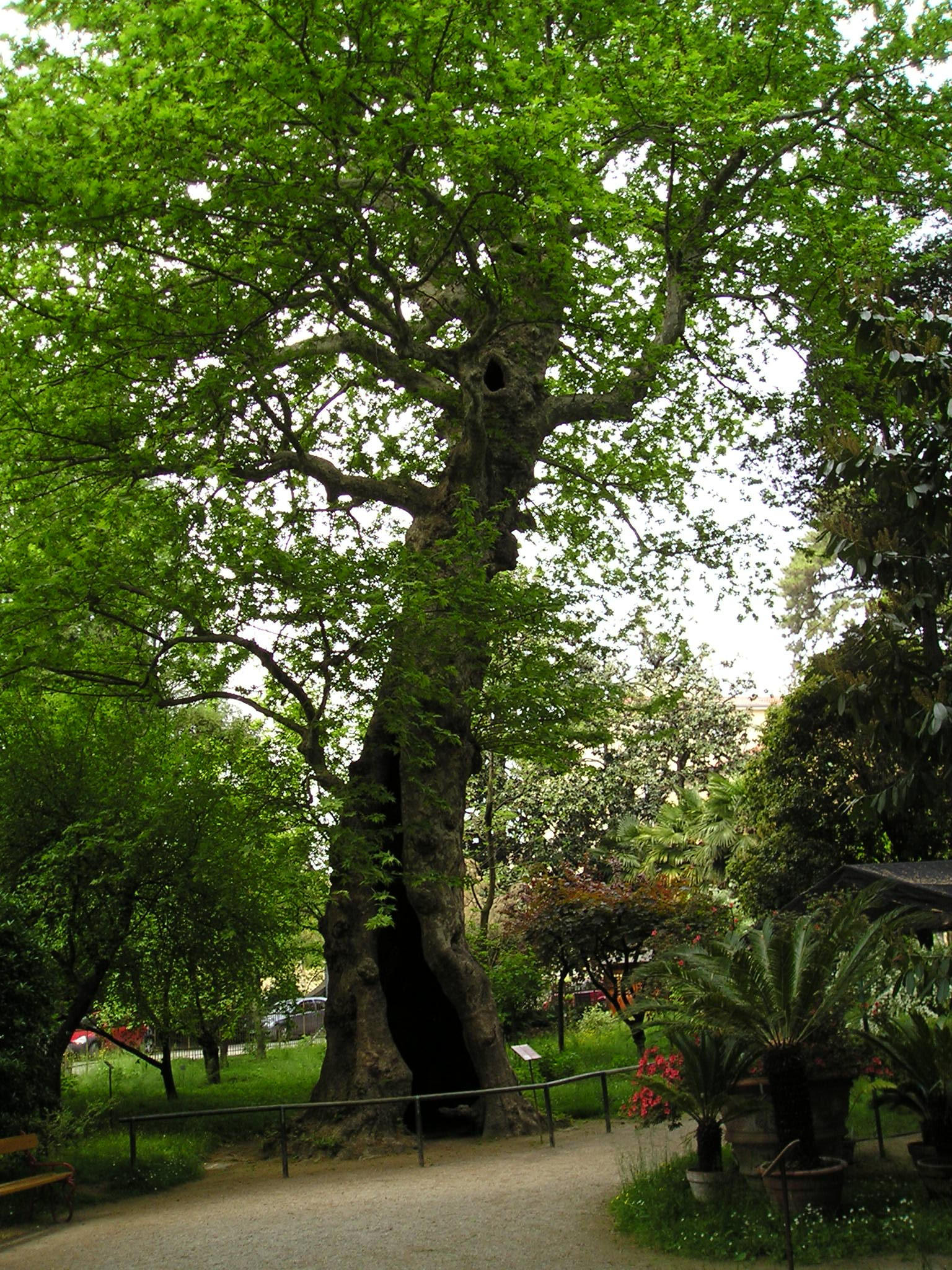
Plane tree (planted in 1680)

The title translates from the Italian as "Never was a shade". It is sung by the main character, Xerxes I of Persia, admiring the shade of a plane tree.

Frondi tenere e belle
del mio platano amato
per voi risplenda il fato.
Tuoni, lampi, e procelle
non v'oltraggino mai la cara pace,
né giunga a profanarvi austro rapace.

Ombra mai fu
di vegetabile,
cara ed amabile,
soave più.

Tender and beautiful fronds
of my beloved plane tree,
let Fate smile upon you.
May thunder, lightning, and storms
never disturb your dear peace,
nor may you by blowing winds be profaned.

Never was a shade
of any plant
dearer and more lovely,
or more sweet.

Because the piece is often sung out of the context of the opera there exist numerous contrafacta both secular and sacred as well as paraphrases and translations. An example of the latter is "Beneath these leafy trees sweet peace receives me" from the chapter entitled "The EE vowel" in Functional Lessons in Singing.

== Media and film ==
On 24 December 1906, Reginald Fessenden, a Canadian inventor and radio pioneer, broadcast the first AM radio program, which started with a phonograph record of "Ombra mai fu".

A 1980s electronic mix instrumental version of the aria can be heard in the cherry blossom viewing scene and forms a central part of Kon Ichikawa's 1983 film The Makioka Sisters.

The song is also used in the Stephen Frears film Dangerous Liaisons (1989) during a private performance in an aristocratic salon. The song was performed by the Portuguese countertenor, Paulo Abel do Nascimento.

In the 1995 BBC adaptation of Jane Austen's Pride and Prejudice, the character Mary Bennet (played by Lucy Briers) plays and sings the song (though rendered in English as "Slumber, dear maid") during a critical scene at the Netherfield Ball.

The song plays a prominent role in Sebastián Lelio's 2017 film A Fantastic Woman, in which Marina, a transgender woman and singer, performs the aria before an audience towards the end of the film.

The song is played during the end credits of the 2023 mystery thriller film The Tutor, performed by Alexander Bornstein and Edward Underhill.

The song plays during the closing scenes of the 2023 Christmas comedy-drama film The Holdovers, as Mr Hunham packs up his room.
