= List of Innsbruck Festival of Early Music productions =

This is a list of productions at the Innsbruck Festival of Early Music since 1977. It includes operas, oratorios and other staged or semi-staged vocal works. Since 2011, one of the festival's annual opera productions has been designated "Baroque Opera: Young" ("Barockoper: Jung"). The casts of these productions feature selected finalists from the previous year's Cesti Competition.

== 1977 – 1989 ==
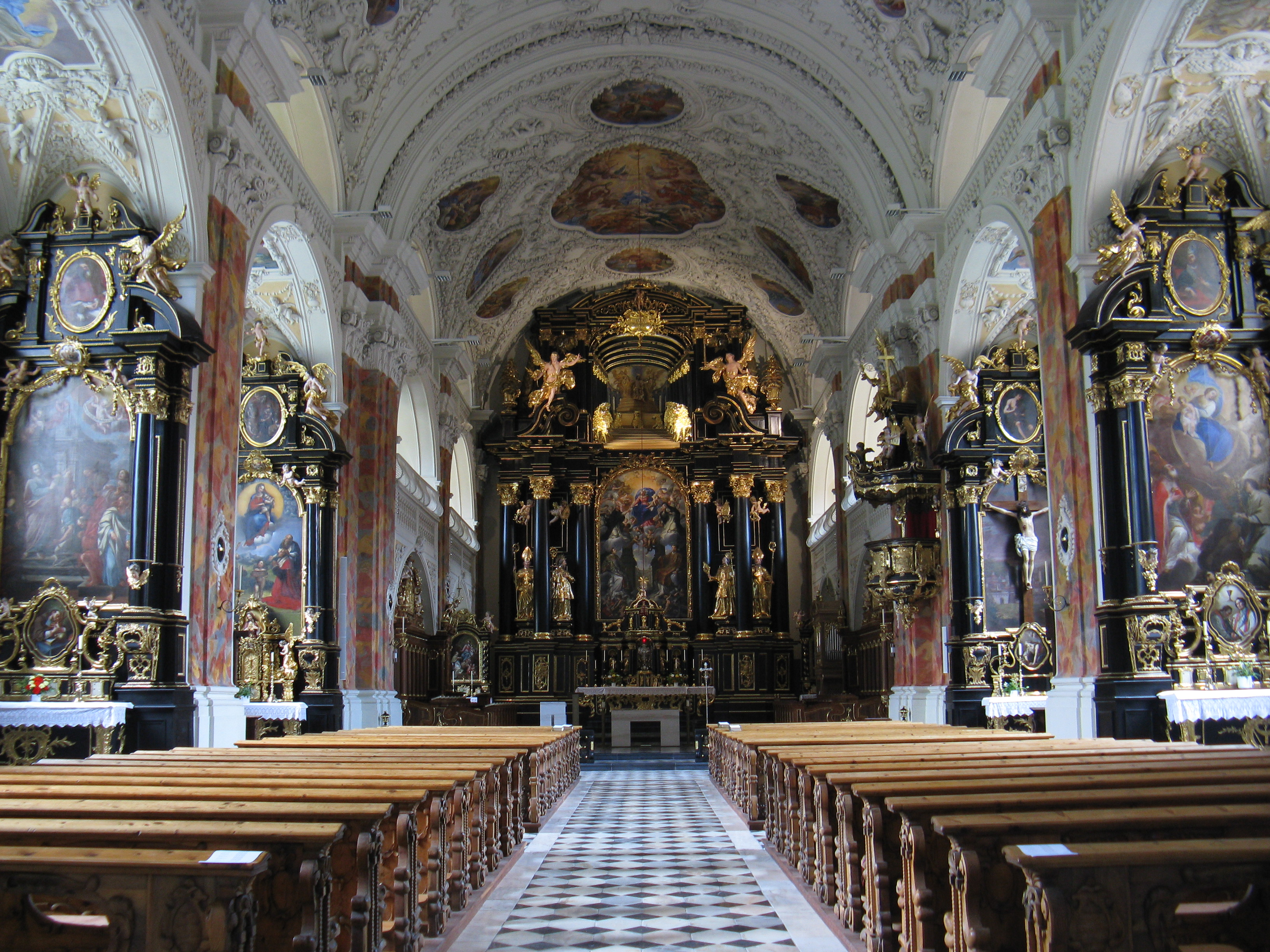
Wilten Abbey Church, where Alessandro Stradella's oratorio Susanna was performed in 1979

- Georg Friedrich Handel: Acis and Galatea (1977)
- Johann Joseph Fux: Psyche (1978)
- Georg Friedrich Handel: Israel in Egypt (oratorio) (1978)
- Alessandro Stradella: Susanna (oratorio) (1979)
- Georg Friedrich Handel: L'Allegro, il Penseroso ed il Moderato (pastoral ode) (1979)
- Claudio Monteverdi: L'incoronazione di Poppea (1980)
- Stefano Landi: Il Sant' Alessio (1981)
- Pietro Antonio Cesti: Orontea (1982)
- Georg Friedrich Handel: Ariodante (1982)
- Pietro Antonio Cesti: Il Tito (1983)
- Georg Friedrich Handel: Rodrigo (1984)
- Christoph Willibald Gluck: Armide (1985)
- Francesco Cavalli: Xerse (1985)
- Francesco Cavalli: Pulcheria (1986)
- Francesco Cavalli: L'Orontea (1986)
- Johann Wolfgang Franck: Die drey Töchter Cecrops (1987)
- Pietro Antonio Cesti: Semiramide (1987)
- Francesco Cavalli: Giasone (1988)
- Alessandro Scarlatti: Gli equivoci nel sembiante (1988)
- Alessandro Stradella: San Giovanni Battista (oratorio) (1988)
- Georg Friedrich Handel: Flavio (1989)

== 1990 – 1999 ==
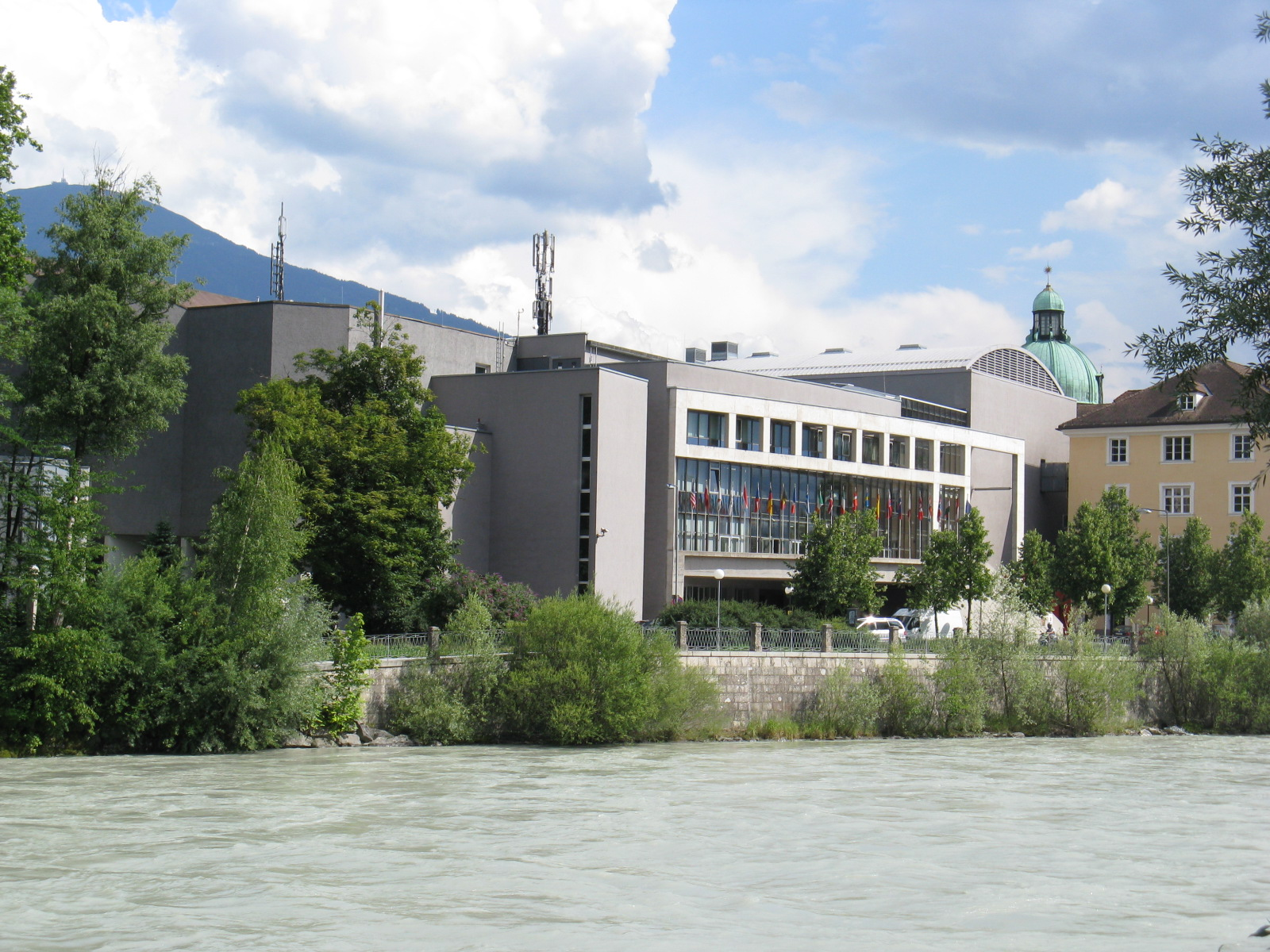
The Innsbruck Congress and Concert Hall, where Handel's Alcina was performed in 1992

- Claudio Monteverdi: L'incoronazione di Poppea (1990)
- Pietro Antonio Cesti: Orontea (1990)
- Henry Purcell: Dido and Aeneas (1990)
- Georg Friedrich Handel: Serse (1991)
- Wolfgang Amadeus Mozart: La finta semplice (1991)
- Francesco Bartolomeo Conti: Don Chisciotte in Sierra Morena (1992)
- Georg Friedrich Handel: Alcina (1992)
- Antonio Caldara: I Disingannati (1993)
- Claudio Monteverdi: Il ritorno d'Ulisse in patria (1993)
- Heinrich Ignaz Franz Biber: Arminio (1994)
- Georg Philipp Telemann: Orpheus (1994)
- Henry Purcell: Dido and Aeneas (1995)
- John Blow: Venus and Adonis (1995)
- Alessandro Scarlatti: Mitridate Eupatore (1995)
- Pietro Antonio Cesti: L'Argia (1996)
- Johann Adolph Hasse: Solimano (1997)
- Florian Leopold Gassmann: L'opera seria (1997)
- Georg Friedrich Handel: Semele (1998)
- Marc-Antoine Charpentier: Les plaisirs de Versailles (1998)
- Claudio Monteverdi: La guerra d'amore (based on madrigals from the 7th and 8th Madrigal Books and Scherzi Musicali) (1999)
- Domenico Mazzocchi: La catena d'Adone (1999)

== 2000 – 2009 ==
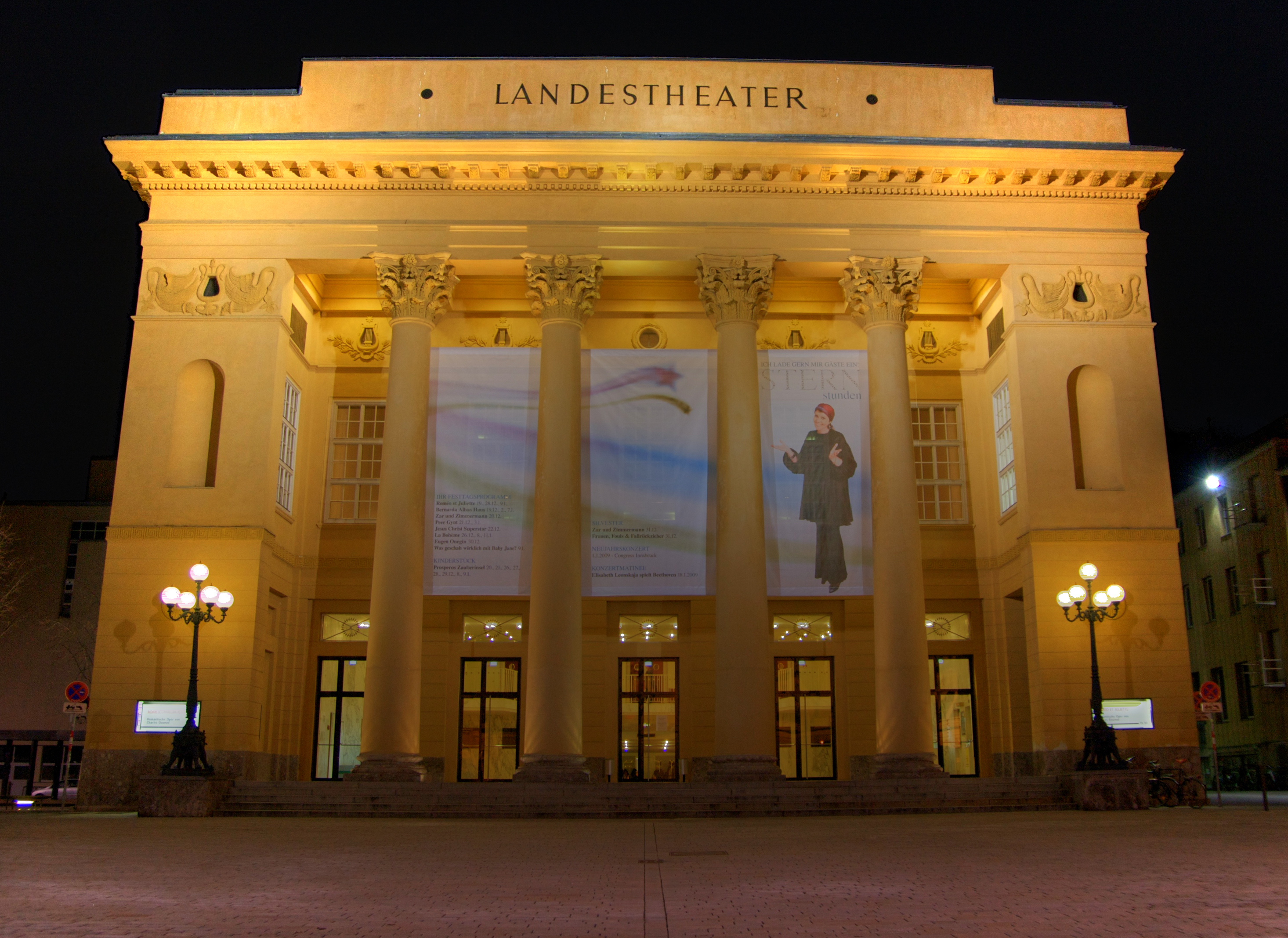
The Tiroler Landestheater where most of the performances took place during this period

- Giovanni Legrenzi: La divisione del mondo (2000)
- Antonio Maria Abbatini: Dale male il bene (2001)
- Joseph Haydn: Il mondo della luna (2001)
- Georg Friedrich Handel: Rinaldo (2002)
- Claudio Monteverdi: L'Orfeo (2003)
- Francesco Cavalli: Eliogabalo (2004)
- Antonio Sartorio: Giulio Cesare in Egitto (2004)
- Francesco Bartolomeo Conti: Don Chisciotte in Sierra Morena (2005)
- Wolfgang Amadeus Mozart: Don Giovanni (2006)
- Wolfgang Amadeus Mozart: Il re pastore (2006)
- Georg Friedrich Handel: Acis and Galatea (2007)
- Georg Philipp Telemann: Der geduldige Sokrates (2007)
- Bernardo Pasquini: Sant' Agnese (oratorio) (2008)
- Georg Friedrich Handel: Belshazzar (oratorio) (2008)
- Joseph Haydn: Orlando paladino (2009)
- Joseph Haydn: L'isola disabitata (2009)

== 2010 – 2019 ==
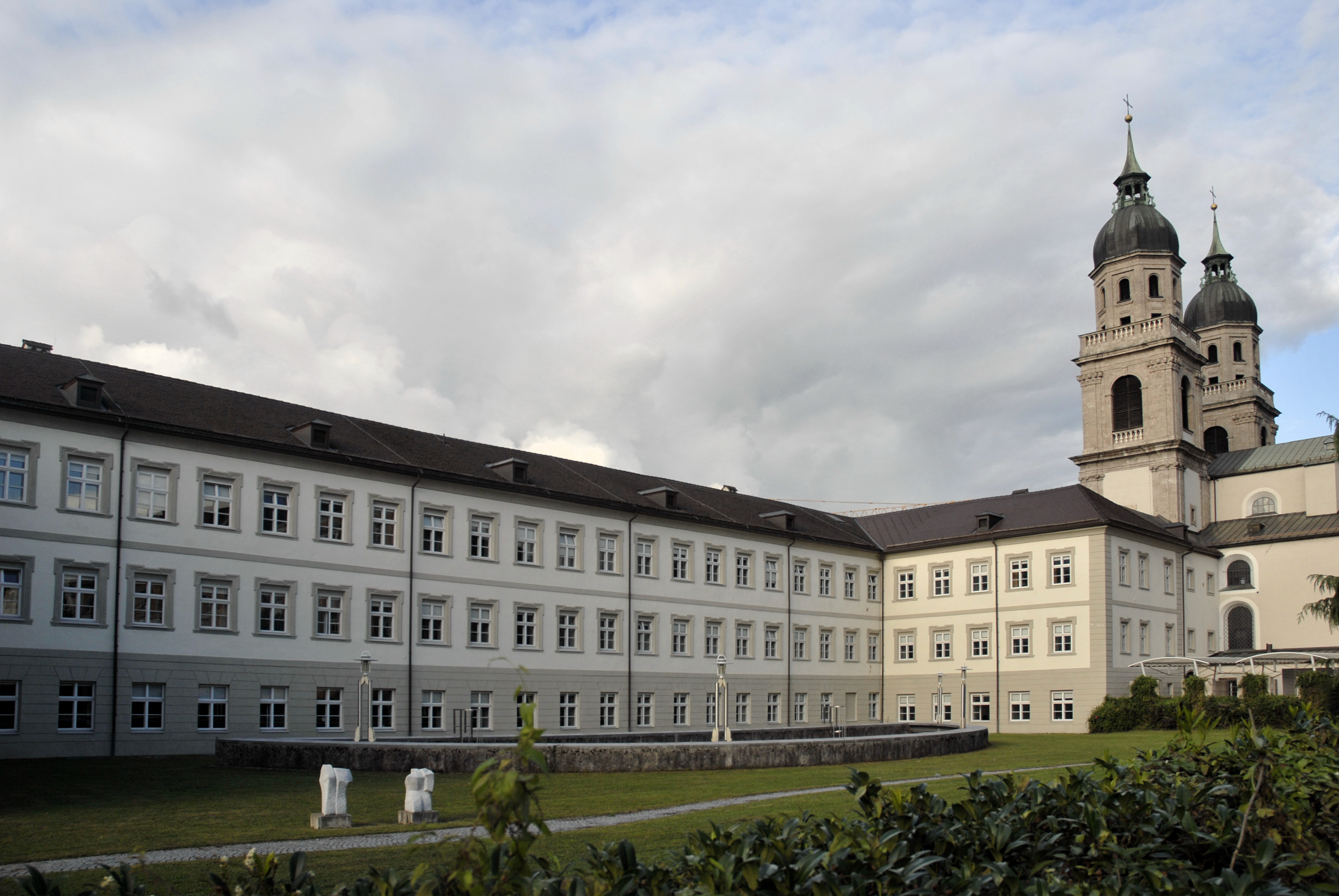
The Theology Faculty courtyard, University of Innsbruck, where Dido and Aeneas and Venus and Adonis were performed in 2013

- Antonio Vivaldi: Ottone in Villa (2010)
- Giovanni Battista Pergolesi: L'Olimpiade (2010)
- Francesco Cavalli: La Calisto ("Baroque Opera: Young" production) (2011)
- Johann Adolph Hasse: Romolo ed Ersilia (2011)
- Georg Philipp Telemann: Flavius Bertaridus (2011)
- Francesco Provenzale: La Stellidaura vendicante (2012)
- Domenico Scarlatti: La Dirindina (2012)
- Giovanni Andrea Bontempi: Il Paride (2012)
- Claudio Monteverdi: L'incoronazione di Poppea ("Baroque Opera: Young" production) (2012)
- Wolfgang Amadeus Mozart: La clemenza di Tito (2013)
- Giulio Caccini and Jacopo Peri: Euridice (2013)
- Henry Purcell: Dido and Aeneas / John Blow: Venus and Adonis ("Baroque Opera: Young" production) (2013)
- Georg Friedrich Handel: Almira (2014)
- Domenico Scarlatti: Narciso (2014)
- Antonio Cesti: Orontea ("Baroque Opera: Young" production) (2014)
- Nicola Porpora: Germanico in Germania (2015)
- Jean-Baptiste Lully: Armide ("Baroque Opera: Young" production) (2015)
- Gluck Alceste René Jacobs (2016)
- Cesti Le nozze in sogno Enrico Onofri (2016)
- Cimarosa Il matrimonio segreto Alessandro De Marchi (2016)
- Claudio Monteverdi Il ritorno d'Ulisse in patria Alessandro De Marchi (2017)
- Rameau Pygmalion (Rameau) Les Talens Lyriques Christophe Rousset (2017)
- Reinhard Keiser Die römische Unruhe, oder Die edelmütgie Octavia, Singspiel Jörg Halubeck (2017)
- Hasse Semele (Hasse) Claudio Osele (2018)
- Cavalli Apollo e Dafne (Cavalli) Massimiliano Toni (2018)
- Mercadante Didone abbandonata (Mercadante) Alessandro De Marchi (2018)
- Broschi Merope (opera) Alessandro De Marchi (2019)
- Handel Ottone, Rè di Germania Fabrizio Ventura (2019)
- Cesti La Dori Ottavio Dantone (2019)

== 2020 - ==
- Ferdinando Paër Leonora Alessandro De Marchi (2020)
- Intermedii for La Pellegrina Eduardo Egüez (2020)
- Melani L'empio punito Mariangiola Martello (2020)
- Bernardo Pasquini, L'Idalma Alessandro De Marchi (2021)
- Johann Mattheson, Boris Goudenow Concerto Theresia (2021)
- Telemann, Pastorelle en musique Ensemble 1700, Dorothee Oberlinger (2021)
- Carl Heinrich Graun Silla (Graun) Alessandro De Marchi (2022)
- Giovanni Bononcini Astarto Stefano Montanari (2022)
- Carlo Pallavicino L'amazzone corsara Luca Quintavalle (2022)
