= Matthias Rexroth =

German countertenor and voice teacher (born 1970)

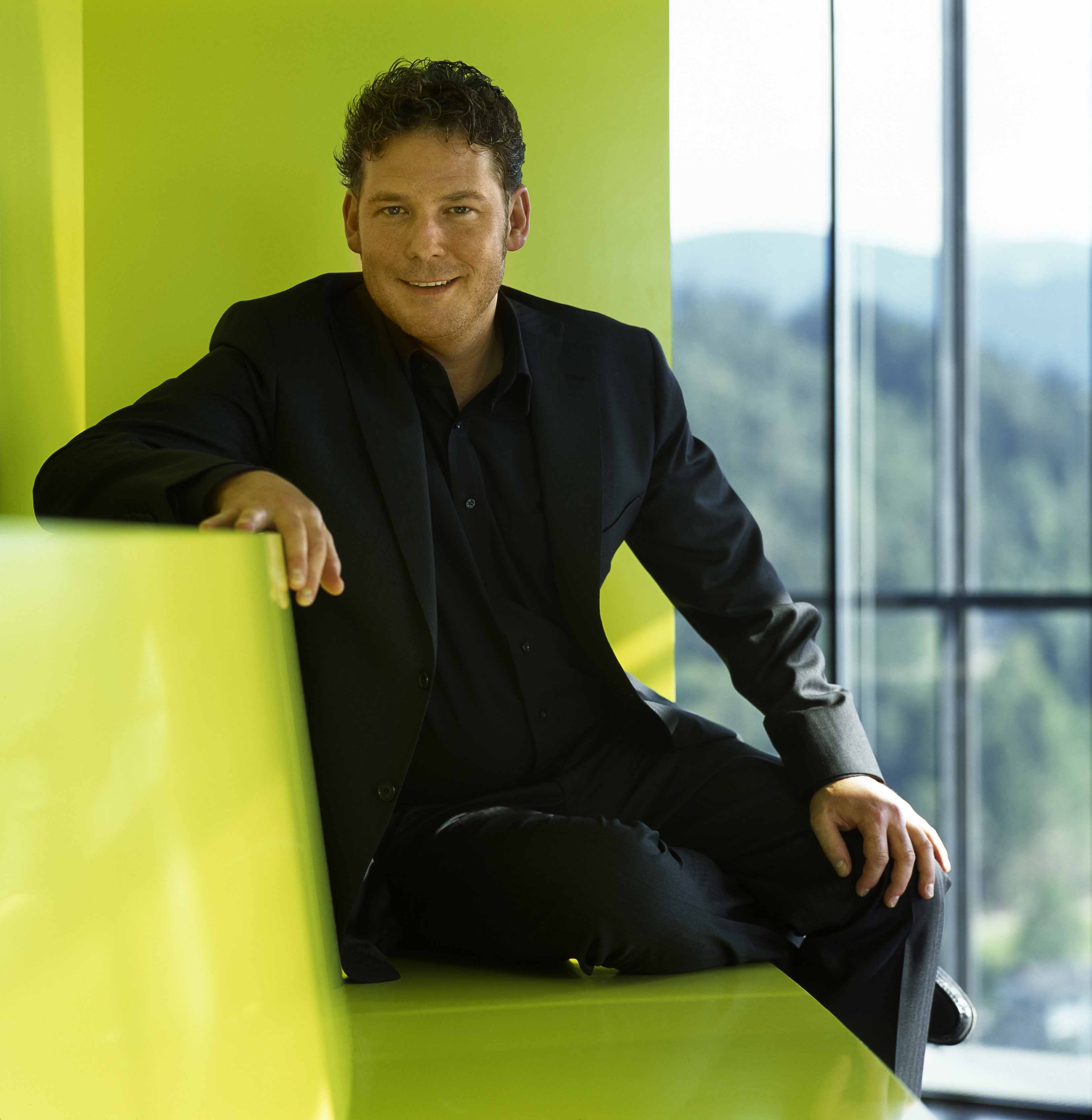
- Born: January 7, 1970 (age 56); Nürnberg, West Germany
- Occupations: Countertenor opera and concert singer
- Years active: 1999 – present
- Awards: 1st Prize, Francisco Viñas International Singing Contest (2000); 1st Prize, Hans Gabor Belvedere Competition (2000)
- Website: matthiasrexroth.de

Matthias Rexroth (b. Nürnberg, Germany, 7 January 1970) is a German countertenor and voice teacher. Winning 1st prizes at the Francisco-Viñas in Barcelona and the 'Belvedere Competition' in Vienna in 2000, preceded an extensive international performing and teaching career.

== Early life and education ==
Matthias Rexroth was raised in Coburg and completed studies as an oboist, playing professionally before discovering his countertenor voice. He usually refers to himself as an Altus (In English, a "Male alto").

Rexroth studied at the Musikhochschule Karlsruhe, the Schola Cantorum Basiliensis, and privately with Marilyn Horne. In 1999 he received a stipend award from the cultural foundation of the state of Baden Württemberg.

== Voice teacher ==
Rexroth was a professor of voice at the Warsaw Opera Academy of the national theater (2014-2020) Teater Wielki and gives masterclasses at such places as the Berlin Hans Eisler Musikhochschule, the Meistersingerakademie in Neumarkt, Frankfurt Opera, Kyoto City University of Arts, Duszniki Zdroj, Daegu, Novosibirsk, Staatstheater Stuttgart, Hochschule für Musik Karlsruhe, Teatro Nacional Santiago (Fundación Ibáñez Atkinson ) the Kaunas Music Academy, Volksoper Wien, as well as masterclasses for ENOA. Among his students are Hannah Fheodoroff, Ewa Tracz, Nils Wanderer, and Jasmin White.

== Career ==
Rexroth was hired by Pamela Rosenberg for his debut at the Staatsoper Stuttgart with Purcell's King Arthur in 1999. A year later, in 2000, followed Apollo in Legrenzi's opera La divisione del mondo at the Schwetzingen Festival with Thomas Hengelbrock. His first major concert appearance was the internationally televised Bach-year 2000, Bach's Mass in B minor from the Leipzig Thomaskirche with Thomaskantor Georg Christoph Biller, the Thomanerchor and the Gewandhaus Orchestra. (Note: Rexroth’s appearance in this concert is discussed effusively by a character named ‘Andre’ in a novel by Roland Schreyer.)

Also in 2000, Rexroth won two competitions, both wins as first countertenor ever: the 37th Francisco-Viñas in Barcelona - first prize in the category Male voices, as well as ‘best counter-tenor’ and the 19th 'Hans Gabor Belvedere Singing Competition' in Vienna, winning the first prize and eight additional prizes.

In 2001 the Cologne Philharmonie nominated Matthias Rexroth for the "Rising Star" award, with a tour of major European concert houses. In 2003 he represented Germany in the BBC Cardiff Singer of the World competition.

Matthias Rexroth has collaborated frequently with the conductor Nikolaus Harnoncourt in roles such as Unulfo in Handel's Rodelinda at the Theater an der Wien, Hamor in Handel’s Jephtha, Didymus in Handel’s Theodora and Purcell’s Ode to St. Cecilia at the Vienna’s Musikverein and the Styriarte festival in Graz. Notable concerts include those with the Vienna Philharmonic under Riccardo Muti, Fabio Luisi with the Accademia di Santa Cecilia Rome, and Danish National Symphony Orchestra, Nicola Luisotti and Donato Renzetti with the Orchestra del Teatro di San Carlo in Naples and Rafael Frühbeck de Burgos with the Wiener Symphoniker, the ORF Radiosymphonieorchester and Vladimir Fedoseyev. Rexroth performs recitals regularly, at the Berlin Philharmonie, Prinzregententheater in Munich, Bad Kissingen, and with pianists Semion Skigin, Matteo Pais, Mariusz Kłubczuk and Eytan Pessen.

Matthias Rexroth has also been a judge for the 10th Stanislaw Moniuszko competition. He has conducted the Georgisches Kammerorchester and the "Ensemble del' Arte" in Ingolstadt. In 2010 Rexroth appeared in a book of cooking recipes by famous opera singers Die Oper kocht by Evelyn Rillé and Johannes Ifkovits.

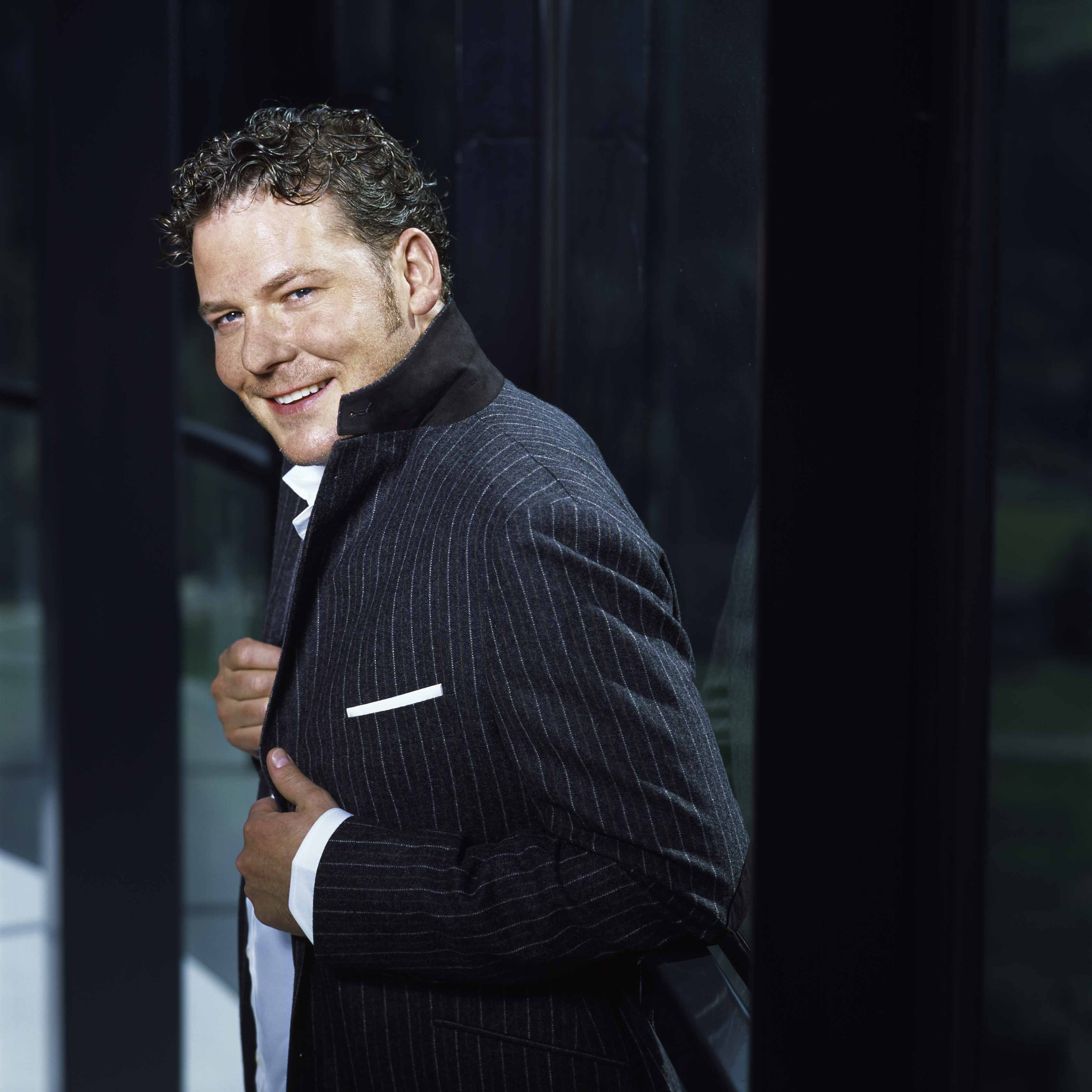
Rexroth Matthias 012 jpg

== Opera ==
Rexroth sang the title roles in Handel's Giulio Cesare (directed by Stefan Herheim) at the Norwegian National Opera and Ballet in Oslo in 2005, Gluck's Ezio with the Deutsche Oper am Rhein in Düsseldorf in 2007, and Handel's Admeto at the Handel Festival, Halle. For his performance of Admeto, Rexroth was nominated "Best Singing Actor" for the 2007 German theatre prize Der Faust. He performed the title role of Handel's Ottone in Halle in 2011. Other Handel roles include Athamas in Semele in Essen, Arcane in Teseo in Opern- und Schauspielhaus Frankfurt and Staatsoper Stuttgart, Armindo in Partenope (under Christophe Rousset) and Tolomeo in Giulio Cesare in Frankfurt (2013-5).

Apart from Handel repertoire, Matthias Rexroth performed Corindo in Antonio Cesti's Orontea under Ivor Bolton (2014) at the Frankfurt opera, Nibbio in Giambattista Martini's L'impresario delle Isole Canarie at the Semperoper Dresden (2014) (where he also performed various roles in Purcell's King Arthur -2014), Telemann's Der geduldige Socrates with René Jacobs at the Festwochen der Alten Musik in Innsbruck and at the Staatsoper Berlin, Ottone in Monteverdi's Poppea at Hamburg State Opera, Oberon in Britten's Midsummer Night's Dream at the Staatstheater Darmstadt. Ozia in Almeida's La Giuditta in Frankfurt, Musico in Donizetti's Le convenienze ed inconvenienze teatrali at the Staatsoper Stuttgart, and Strauss’ Die Fledermaus in the Aalto Theatre in Essen under Stefan Soltesz, and Alfonso in Francesco Cavalli's Veremonda.

== Concerts ==
Concert appearances with the Vienna Philharmonic, Gewandhausorchester Leipzig, St. Petersburg Philharmonic, Radio Televisione Española Madrid, Staatsorchester Stuttgart, Santa Cecilia orchestra, Akademie für Alte Musik Berlin, Freiburg Baroque Orchestra, Concerto Köln, Internationale Bachakademie Stuttgart, the Berliner Philharmoniker Scharoun Ensemble Orchestra Montis realis, and the festivals of Schwetzingen, Innsbruck, Ludwigsburg, Rheingau, Baden-Baden and Shanghai.

The composer Wolfgang Rihm wrote Kolonos (“Oedipus auf Kolonos”) for Rexroth, performed and recorded by the SWR and the Rossini in Wildbad opera festival in 2008, and with Constantin Trinks in Darmstadt.

== Recordings ==
Recordings with all major broadcasting companies in Germany have taken place. These include: Bayerischer Rundfunk, Mitteldeutscher Rundfunk, Hessischer Rundfunk, Norddeutscher Rundfunk, SFB, Südwestrundfunk, ORF and Deutsche Welle.

=== Specific recordings ===
- 2001: J.S. Bach Mass in B minor, Universal Music Classics & Jazz ASIN: B003TXPUN2
- 2004: Rossini Tancredi, Nef ASIN: B0002CPFCE
- 2004: Solo recital: Stimme der Könige, Matthias Rexroth NEF ASIN: B0001TSYZS
- 2007: Händel, Admeto, Arthaus ASIN: B000M2EBTC
- 2007: Gluck's Ezio
- 2008: CPE Bach Magnificat / Die Himmel erzählen die Ehre Gottes, ASIN: B001GHD43G
- 2011: Telemann Germanicus, CPO, ASIN: B005UU066S
- 2012: Handel Teseo, Carus, 2012, ASIN: B002QEIQVI
- 2012: Mozart Ascanio in Alba, K. 111 (Excerpts) Ars Produktion ASIN: B008Y1VLGE

== Interviews ==
- Heinrich Becker, "Matthias Rexroth Temperament für die Bühne", Orpheus, March–April 2003, pp. 10–11 (In German)
- Live interview on NDR (In German)
- 2008 interview retrieved June 2013. (In German)
