= La Dori =

- Opera by Antonio Cesti
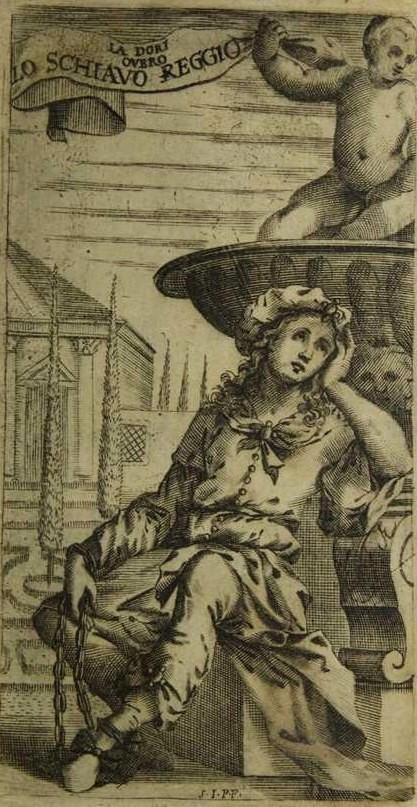
- Dori in her slave chains (from the libretto for the 1667 Venice production)
- Librettist: Giovanni Filippo Apolloni
- Premiere: 1657; Hoftheater, Innsbruck

La Dori, overo Lo schiavo reggio (Doris, or The Royal Slave) is a tragi-comic opera in a prologue and three acts composed by Antonio Cesti to a libretto by Giovanni Filippo Apolloni. (Note: In some versions of the libretto, the title is given as La Dori, overo La schiava fedele (Doris, or The Faithful Slave).) It was first performed in the court theatre at Innsbruck in 1657. The story is set in Babylon on the shores of the Euphrates and is a convoluted tale of mistaken identities—a female protagonist who disguised as a man eventually regains her lost lover, and a man disguised as a woman who causes another man to fall in love with him. In several respects it resembles the plot of Cesti and Apolloni's earlier opera L'Argia and foreshadows Apostolo Zeno's libretto for Gli inganni felici (1695) and Metastasio's libretto for L'Olimpiade (1733). The first Italian staging of La Dori was in Florence in 1661 for the wedding of Cosimo III de' Medici, Grand Duke of Tuscany. It subsequently became one of the most popular operas in 17th-century Italy. The opera was revived three times in the 20th century, beginning in 1983.

== Background and performance history ==
Following its premiere at the court theatre of Ferdinand Charles, Archduke of Austria in Innsbruck in 1657, La Dori was brought to Italy and performed in Florence in June 1661 as part of the festivities celebrating the wedding of Cosimo III de' Medici, the future Grand Duke of Tuscany, to Marguerite Louise d'Orléans. It was the second opera created by Antonio Cesti and his librettist Giovanni Filippo Apolloni for the Innsbruck court of Ferdinand Charles. Cesti had been appointed the court composer in 1652 and Apolloni the court poet in 1653. Their first operatic collaboration had been L'Argia which was performed in 1655 to celebrate Queen Christina of Sweden's visit to Innsbruck. It proved to very popular and over the next 20 years had multiple productions in Italy. La Dori was to be even more popular. It had at least 30 productions between 1657 and 1689, predominantly in Italy but also in Austria and Germany, and at least 26 separate publications of its libretto. (Note: Apolloni's libretto was later set by Alessandro Scarlatti. Scarlatti's La Dori premiered at the Teatro San Bartolomeo in Naples in 1689.)

There are no known copies of the original libretto, although in the 20th century a scenario in German (Doris Die Glükkhafte leibeigne Dienerin) (Note: The title of the German scenario translates as "Doris the Fortunate Slave".) which had been printed for the Innsbruck performance was found in a Stuttgart library by the Italian musicologist Lorenzo Bianconi. The libretto published for the 1661 Florence production is thought to be very close to the original. The production had two ballets—The Dance of the Eunuchs and The Dance of the Moors. The prologue was a dispute between La Corte and Momo and reflected the theme of the opera itself. Momo, more familiar in English as Momus, was a stock character in the commedia dell'arte who constantly hid behind false names and disguises.

La Dori was first brought to Venice in 1663 where it was an immediate success with subsequent productions in 1667 and 1670. On those occasions, the opera was adapted to suit Venetian taste as well as the strengths of the star singers, with fairly extensive cuts (particularly to the recitatives), the addition of new arias, and the expansion of some comic scenes. The Dance of the Moors was changed to The Dance of the Soldiers, and the prologue became an elaborate affair involving Apollo, Amor, and the personifications Inganno (Deception) and Invidia (Envy). The prologue for the performance in Vienna for Emperor Leopold I was even more elaborate and featured Mars, four Amazons, and the personification La Fama (Fame) all singing the praises of the emperor and his court. During the course of its performance history La Dori had at least 14 different prologues often devised to flatter the patron of the production or to suit local tastes. The music for some of the later prologues was written by other composers such as Alessandro Stradella who composed the prologue music for the 1672 performance in Rome.

La Dori was revived three times in the 20th century. Its first production in modern times was in 1983 at the Spitalfields Festival in London directed by Graham Vick and sung in English translation. In his review of the performance Stanley Sadie singled out for particular praise the laments and amorous languishing arias of the lovers, the music for the comic scenes between the servants, and above all the duets:

Cesti well knew how to exploit the sensuous effect of two high voices intertwining. On the strength of La Dori one could call him the Richard Strauss of his times.

Sadie also noted that the programme had contained neither a synopsis nor an annotated cast list, and the audience was utterly perplexed by the convoluted plot with its multiple disguises and mistaken identities. Further productions were staged in 1990 at the Mannes College of Music in New York City, where the New York Times critic Bernard Holland was equally perplexed by the plot, and in 1999 at the Cittadella Musicale in Arezzo A production for the 2019 Innsbruck Early Music Festival directed by Stefano Vizioli and conducted by Ottavio Dantone was subsequently issued on both CD and DVD.

== Roles ==
- Dori, daughter of King Archelao of Nicaea, wrongly believed to be the daughter of King Termodoonte of Egypt, in the guise of a male slave named "Ali"
- Oronte, Prince of Persia and heir to the throne, in love with Dori
- Artaserse, Oronte's uncle and regent
- Arsinoe, daughter of King Archelao, Dori's sister
- Tolomeo, Prince of Egypt in the guise of a young woman named "Celinda", in love with Arsinoé
- Arsete, Dori's old tutor
- Erasto, captain of Oronte's guards and in love with "Celinda"
- Dirce, Oronte's old nurse
- Golo, Oronte's servant and buffoon
- Bagoa, a eunuch and guardian of the seraglio in Babylon (in some versions of the libretto, this character is named "Ermindo")
- Ghost of Oronte's mother Parisatide

The cast of the 1657 premiere is not known, but it was assembled from the troupe of Italian singers whom Cesti had gathered for his previous Innsbruck productions. The romantic male leads and several (possibly all) of the female roles were sung by castrati. Cesti himself, who also sang tenor roles in the premieres of his other Innsbruck operas, may have sung the role of Arsete.

The voice types for each role are also difficult to specify definitively. There are four main surviving manuscripts of the score with significant variations between them. Roles were written and re-written depending on which singer had been engaged, not simply transposing but also adding new material. Some of the music in later versions of the score may not have been written by Cesti at all. He died in 1669. The manuscript held in the Austrian National Library appears to be the closest to 1661 Florence libretto in terms of the text of the opera itself, although it has a different prologue and an additional epilogue. (Note: The other three manuscript scores are held in the Biblioteca Marciana in Venice, the Biblioteca Estense in Modena, and the British Museum in London.) Its exact date is unknown but Köchel proposed that it dates from a performance in Vienna in 1664. In the Vienna manuscript, the title role is written for the mezzo-soprano vocal range, but it was later re-written for soprano. Its most famous exponent was the Roman soprano Giulia Masotti whose nickname became "La Dori". Erasto is written for a bass in the Vienna version but later became an alto role, while Arsete began as a tenor and subsequently became a bass.

== Synopsis ==
The opera has a lengthy backstory published as the argomento in the preface to the libretto. Dori and her younger sister Arsinoe are the daughters of King Archelao of Nicaea. As a child, Dori had been betrothed to Oronte, son of the King of Persia as part of a friendship pact between the two kings. Meanwhile, the King of Egypt also has a daughter called Dori and a son, Prince Tolomeo. When the Egyptian Dori is accidentally killed as a small child, her tutor Arsete flees Egypt and joins a band of pirates. When the pirates attack King Archelao's castle, Arsete captures the Nicene Dori, takes her back to Egypt, and passes her off as the dead Egyptian Dori. She is subsequently raised as the princess of Egypt.

Oronte, now a young man, is sent by his father to Egypt to learn the art of war accompanied by the captain of his guards, Erasto. There he and Dori fall in love. However, Oronte's dying father recalls him to Persia and tells him that he cannot marry an Egyptian princess and instead must fulfill the contract with King Archelao. Since the Nicene Dori has been missing for years and is presumed dead, he must now marry her younger sister Arsinoe. Shortly before his death, Oronte's father puts him under the regency of Artaserse to ensure that he fulfills the marriage contract.

Back in Egypt, Dori is fearful that her beloved Oronte will not return from Persia. Accompanied by Erasto, she disguises herself as a boy named "Ali" and goes in search of him. On the journey, she and Erasto become separated. He believes her to have been drowned and on his arrival breaks the news to the broken-hearted Oronte who refuses to believe that she is actually dead. In fact, Dori is not dead. She has washed ashore, captured by thieves, and sold as a slave boy to none other than her real sister Arsinoe.

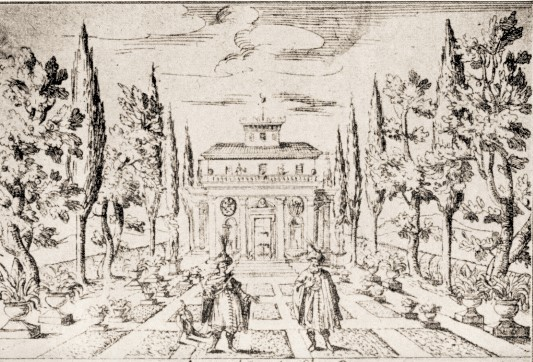
Depiction of the stage set for the gardens of the seraglio, 1665

Arsinoe and "Ali" (Dori) become close friends and confidantes and travel to Babylon for Arsinoe's wedding to Oronte. Arsinoe has conceived a passion for her future husband but is disturbed by his coldness. Meanwhile, Tolomeo arrives in Babylon looking for Dori, whom he believes to be his sister, and Oronte, whom he believes has offended his family's honor by deserting her. Once there, he falls madly in love with Arsinoe. To get close to her he disguises himself as a woman named "Celinda" and enters the seraglio in Babylon where he too becomes a friend and confidante of Arsinoe. With both, his son and daughter missing, the King Of Egypt sends Dori's old tutor Arsete to Babylon to find them and bring them home.

At this point, the opera begins on the shores of the Euphrates. Over the next three acts, multiple complications ensue from the disguises and mistaken identities. These include Erasto falling in love with "Celinda" (Tolomeo), Oronte being deposed from his future throne for ultimately refusing to marry Arsinoe, and "Ali" (Dori) attempting suicide. Her selfless motive was to force Oronte to marry Arsinoe and thus regain his throne. Interspersed with these scenes are lengthy comic exchanges between Dirce, Oronte's old nurse, and Golo, his buffoonish servant, as well as tirades about the mannish and immoral behaviour of "Celinda" from Bagoa, the eunuch who guards the seraglio.

In the end, Dori's suicide is foiled by Dirce who hate to see such a handsome "boy" die, substitutes a sleeping potion for the poison she intends to take. For some inexplicable reason, despite having been kidnapped as a small child, raised as an Egyptian princess, nearly drowned years later and then sold into slavery, Dori still had on her person the original marriage contract from Nicea. Artaserse discovers it when he tries to arouse her from the stupor caused by the sleeping potion. Arsete is then forced to explain everything. With Dori's true identity revealed, she and Oronte can now marry. Arsinoe accepts the love of Tolomeo, and they too will now marry. The opera ends with a quartet of the two couples singing:

After a thousand troubles, a river of tears gives way to a sea of joy (Note: In the later Venice versions, the final lines are a duet between Dori and Oronte singing: "Born from the fire of death; the love of Oronte and Dori triumphs.")

== Recordings ==
A complete recording was made of the production at Innsbruck in 2019, released on CD in 2020 on CPO and on DVD in 2021 on Naxos; the cast includes Emőke Baráth (as Tolomeo/Celinda), Francesca Ascioti (as Dori/Ali), Rupert Enticknap (Oronte), Federico Sacchi (Artaserse), Francesca Lombardi Mazzuli (Arsinoe), Bradley Smith (Arsete), Pietro Di Bianco (Erasto), Alberto Allegrezza (Dirce), and the Accademia Bizantina conducted by Ottavio Dantone.

Excerpts appear on the following:

- Alma Mia with soprano Raquel Andueza and the ensemble La Galania (contains the aria "Amor se la palma" and two sinfonias from the opera). Recorded in 2013. Label: Anima e Corpo
- Pasticcio with soprano Judith Nelson, counter-tenor René Jacobs, and a baroque instrumental ensemble led by William Christie (contains the duet "Se perfido Amore"). Recorded live in 1980 at the Innsbruck Festival of Early Music. Label: ORF (Edition alte Musik series)
