= Giovanni Filippo Apolloni =

Italian librettist

- Born: c. 1620; Arezzo, Grand Duchy of Tuscany
- Died: 15 May 1688 (aged 67–68)
- Occupations: Poet and librettist

Giovanni Filippo Apolloni (c.1620 – 15 May 1688) was an Italian poet and librettist. (Note: Walker gives the birth year as c.1635, but this would have made Apolloni a very young teenager at the time when he was already an established poet and member of the Accademia dei Percossi and only 18 when he was appointed court poet to the Archduke of Austria.) Born in Arezzo, he has sometimes been referred to as "Giovanni Apollonio Apolloni", but the second given name is spurious. He served as the court poet to Ferdinand Charles, Archduke of Austria at Innsbruck form 1653 until 1659. On his return to Italy he entered the service of Cardinal Volumnio Bandinelli. After Bandinelli's death in 1667 Appolloni was in the service of the Chigi family in Rome and Siena for the rest of his life. He wrote the librettos for a number of operas, the most well-known of which were Antonio Cesti's L'Argia and La Dori, as well as several oratorios and the texts for cantatas by both Cesti and Alessandro Stradella.

== Biography ==
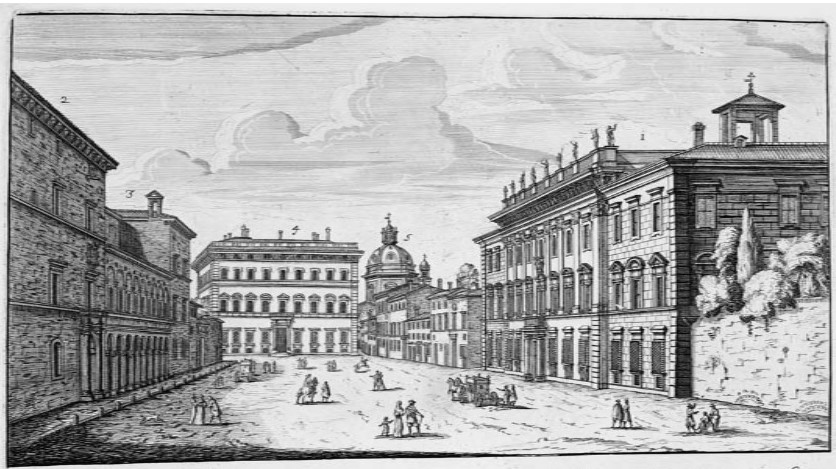
The Piazza dei Santi Apostoli in Rome in 1665. The large building on the right is the Palazzo Chigi where Apolloni was a member of the household from 1668 until his death in 1688

Apolloni was born in Arezzo to a family prominent in the city's history. Little is known about his early life, but according to Carolyn Gianturco in her biography of Alessandro Stradella, Apolloni had been a mercenary before turning to poetry. In the 1640s he was a member of Accademia dei Percossi in Florence. Founded by Salvator Rosa, its members were composed of the intellectual and artistic elite of the city and included Giacinto Andrea Cicognini, Antonio Cesti, Antonio Abati, and Lorenzo Lippi. In 1653, on the recommendation of Rosa's patron Cardinal Giancarlo de' Medici, Apolloni was appointed court poet to Ferdinand Charles, Archduke of Austria at Innsbruck. There he produced the libretti for three works by Antonio Cesti: the operas L'Argia (1655) and La Dori (1657) and the courtly entertainment Mars und Adonis (1655). Both L'Argia and Mars und Adonis were performed during the week-long celebrations in November 1655 welcoming Queen Christina of Sweden on her journey to Rome. For Cesti's opera Orontea, performed in Innsbruck in 1656, Apolloni revised the original libretto by Cicognini and wrote a new prologue involving a debate between Philosophy and Love. (Note: Cicognini's libretto for Orontea was first performed in Venice in 1649, although there is a debate amongst scholars as to whether Cesti or Francesco Lucio had composed the music for that version.)

In 1659 Apolloni returned to Italy and shortly thereafter entered the service of Cardinal Volumnio Bandinelli (1598–1667) who had been a fellow member of the Accademia dei Percossi. After the death of Bandinelli, he joined the Chigi household in Rome, working first for Cardinal Sigismondo Chigi and then for Sigismondo's cousin Cardinal Flavio Chigi. The Colonna and Chigi families, who both had residences in the Piazza dei Santi Apostoli in Rome, had close social, political, and cultural ties with each other. They jointly sponsored the creation of several operas with libretti by Apolloni, including L'Alcasta composed by Bernardo Pasquini and dedicated to Queen Christina. It was through this extended network that Apolloni also began working with Alessandro Stradella. In 1672 Flavio and Agostino Chigi formed the Accademia degli Sfaccendati (Academy of the Idlers). Its members were their close associates and all shared an interest in the theatre. They included Apolloni, Queen Christina (patron of the Teatro Tordinona in Rome), Filippo Acciaiuoli (the Tordinona's impresario), Giuliano Capranica whose family ran the Teatro Capranica, and Alessandro Capizucchi. The express purpose of the Sfaccendati was to produce operas to be performed at the Chigi palazzo in Ariccia on the outskirts of Rome. Apolloni and Acciaiuoli co-authored the librettos for two operas which were performed there, Il Tirinto and L'Adalinda. However the high cost of producing operas so far from the center of Rome made L'Adalinda the last of these "country house operas". The last opera for which Apolloni wrote the libretto was La forza d'amore composed by Bernardo Pasquini. A slight pastoral work with only three characters, it was performed in Florence at the Villa di Pratolino in 1679.

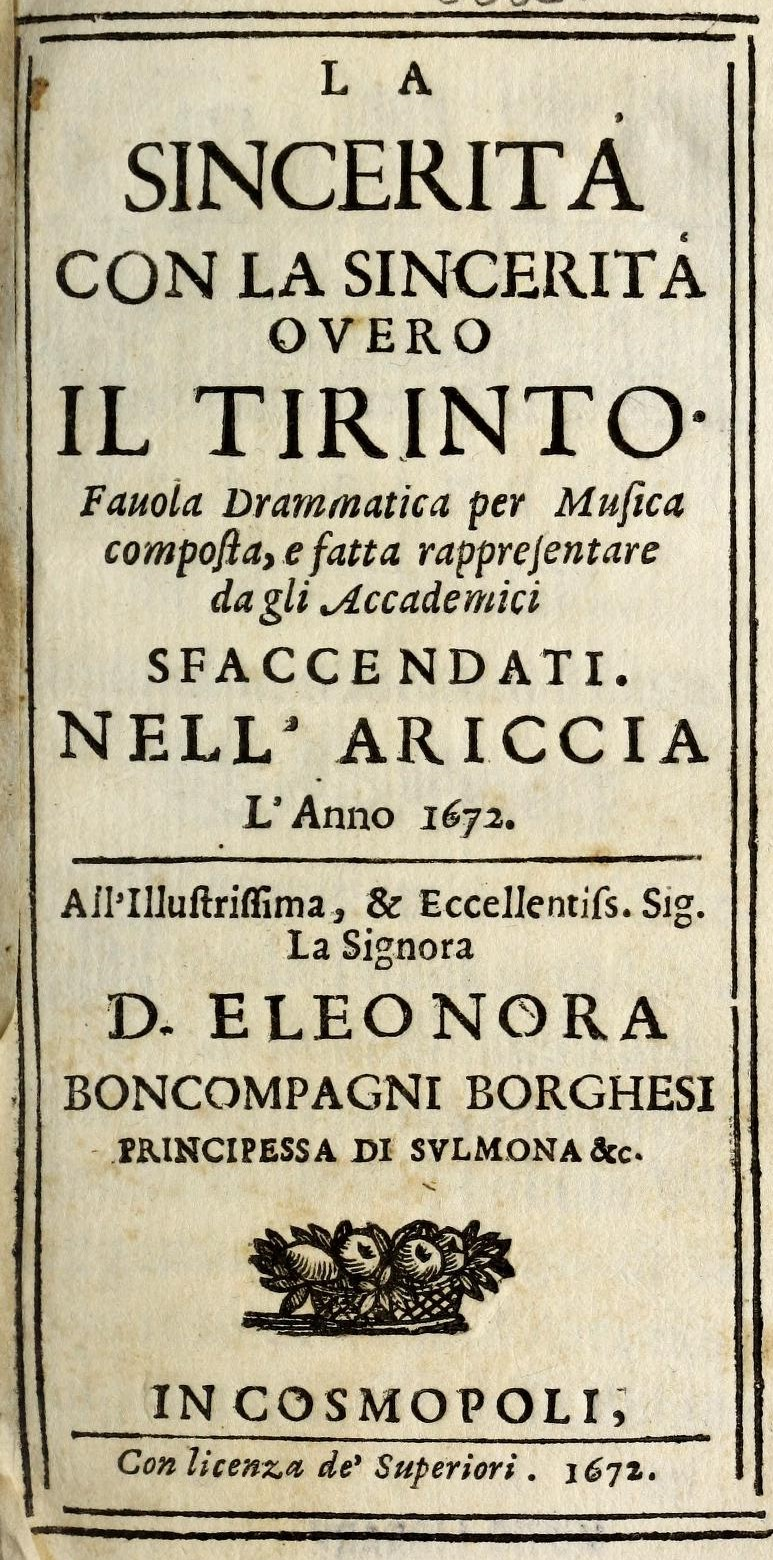
Title page of Apolloni's libretto for Il Tirinto, composed by Bernardo Pasquini and first performed in 1672

Apolloni stayed in the service of the Chigi family until his death in 1688. His most enduring works remain the two Innsbruck operas he wrote for Antonio Cesti in the 1650s—La Dori and L'Argia. Convoluted semi-comic tales of multiple disguises and mistaken identities, both of them were immensely popular in their day with multiple productions in Italy during Apolloni's lifetime. L'Argia had its first performance in modern times at the Innsbruck Festival of Early Music in 1996 with subsequent performances in Lausanne and Paris. La Dori has been revived several times in the 20th century, including productions in 1983 at the Spitalfields Festival in London, 1990 at the Mannes College of Music in New York, and 1999 at the Cittadella Musicale in Arezzo.

== Works ==
=== Operas and other stage works ===
- L'Argia (opera in a prologue and 3 acts), set by Antonio Cesti, Innsbruck, 1655
- Mars und Adonis (azione teatrale), also known as Marte placato), set by Antonio Cesti, Innsbruck 1655; set in a condensed version by Alessandro Scarlatti as the prologue to Cavalli's Scipione affricano, Rome, 1671
- New prologue and revisions to Orontea, set by Antonio Cesti to a libretto originally by Giacinto Andrea Cicognini, Innsbruck, 1656
- La Dori (opera in a prologue and 3 acts), set by Antonio Cesti, Innsbruck, 1657; also set by Alessandro Scarlatti, Naples, 1689
- Il Girello (opera in a prologue three acts), co-authored with Filippo Acciaiuoli, set by Jacopo Melani with the prologue set by Alessandro Stradella, Rome, 1668
- Circe (serenata in three parts), set by Alessandro Stradella, performed at the Villa Aldobrandini in honour of Cardinal Leopoldo de' Medici, Frascati, 1668
- L'empio punito (opera in 3 acts), co-authored with Filippo Acciaiuoli, set by Alessandro Melani, Rome, 1669
- New prologue and revisions to Giasone, originally composed by Francesco Cavalli to a libretto by Cicognini and premiered in 1649. The new prologue and further revisions by Apolloni to the libretto and Alessandro Stradella to the score were done for its revival in Rome under the title Il novello Giasone in 1671.
- Su, su si stampino in bel lavoro and Amanti, che credete? (intermezzi), set by Alessandro Scarlatti and interpolated in the revival of Cavalli's Scipione affricano, Rome, 1671
- L'Alcasta (opera in 3 acts), set by Bernardo Pasquini, Rome, 1673
- Astiage (opera in 3 acts), adapted by Matteo Noris from the original libretto by Apolloni, set by Giovanni Buonaventura Viviani, Venice, 1677
- Il Tirinto (opera in 3 acts), co-authored with Filippo Acciaiuoli, set by Bernardo Pasquini, Ariccia, 1672
- L'Adalinda (opera in 3 acts), co-authored with Filippo Acciaiuoli, set by Pietro Simone Agostini, Ariccia, 1673
- La forza d'amore (opera in 3 acts), set by Bernardo Pasquini, Florence, 1679

=== Oratorios ===
- Caino e Abele (Cain and Abel), set by Bernardo Pasquini in 1671
- Iefte (Jephthah), set by Antonio Masini in 1675 and by Giovan Battista Tomasi in 1689
- Il sacrificio d'Abramo (The Sacrifice of Abraham), set by Antonio Masini in 1675
- L'Assalonne (Absalom), set by Paolo Petti in 1681

=== Cantatas ===
- Set by Antonio Cesti
  - Alpi nevose e dure
  - Era l'alba vicina
  - Rimbombava d'intorno
  - Il Nerone or Sovra un'eccelsa torre (also set by Alessandro Stradella)
  - Era la notte e muto
  - Ferma Lachesi ohimé
- Set by Alessandro Stradella
  - Il piu' tenero affetto
  - Solcava incauto legno
  - Chi non sa che la costanza
  - Sprezzata mi credei
  - Io che lasciato fui
  - Il Nerone or Sovra un'eccelsa torre (also set by Antonio Cesti)
