= L'Idalma =

L'Idalma, ovvero chi dura la vince (Idalma, or whoever perseveres wins) is an opera (commedia per musica) by Bernardo Pasquini to a libretto by Giuseppe Domenico de Totis. It premiered on 6 February 1680 at the Teatro Capranica, Rome.

== Recording ==
- L'Idalma, Arianna Vendittelli, Anita Rosati, Margherita Sala, Juan Sancho, Rupert Charlesworth, Innsbrucker Festwochen Orchester, Alessandro De Marchi CPO, DDD, recorded 2021, released 2022
