= Christoph Gumpp the Younger =

Austrian architect

Christoph Gumpp the Younger (28 May 1600 in Innsbruck – 2 March 1672 in Innsbruck) was an Austrian court cabinetmaker and Baroque architect.

== Career ==
Christoph Gumpp the Younger learned to be a cabinetmaker presumably at his father's, Christoph Gumpp the Elder (deceased 1623). The Elder was a cabinetmaker of the court – a function which is documented for the Younger from 1626 onwards. In 1628, Christoph the Younger travelled to Italy to study the architecture of Italian theatres. After returning to Innsbruck he constructed the old court theatre Altes Hoftheater in 1629 which became a court riding school soon after and served as a tollhouse Dogana in the 19th century. That building was hit by bombs during World War II, some remains including the historic arcades are still part of today's convention centre Congress Innsbruck.

In 1655 Christoph Gumpp the Younger completed the new court theatre, the so-called Neues Komödienhaus at the location of today's Landestheater. It was commissioned by Archduke Ferdinand Charles who intended a new opera house according to Venetian models. The Italian Baroque composer Antonio Cesti, then employed at the Innsbruck court, composed a large number of operas for that new court theatre. It was the very first detached opera house in the German-speaking area and also the first German stage with salaried staff. The bare brickwork of the new court theatre was inaugurated already in 1654 with the performance of Cesti's opera La Cleopatra.

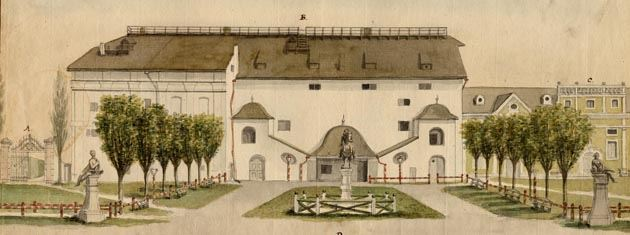
New Court Theater (Neues Komödienhaus), Innsbruck

Christoph Gumpp the Younger is nowadays best known for a number of sacred buildings in Innsbruck. He designed the facade of the Jesuit Church which was built from 1626 to 1640. From 1648 to 1649, St. Mary's Church was constructed according to his design. He also planned the baroque reconstruction of the Wilten Basilica (1651–1665). In addition, he realised the Castrum doloris for Archduke Leopold V (1646) and his wife Claudia, Archduchess of Tyrol (1649), as well as for Archduke Ferdinand Charles (1662) and Archduke Sigismund Francis (1665) who was the last in the younger Tyrolean line of the House of Habsburg.

In 1633, Archduchess Claudia appointed Christoph Gumpp the Younger court architect. He was confirmed in this office by Emperor Leopold I in 1668.

== Private life ==
On May 12, 1625, Christoph Gumpp the Younger married Elisabeth Schwaickhofer, who died in 1639. On January 30, 1640, he wed Anna Auer. In 1662, the castle of Fragenstein near the market town of Zirl was granted him as a fief from Archduke Ferdinand Charles. In total, Christoph Gumpp the Younger had 19 children, among them noted artists like

- Johannes Gumpp (1626–after 1646), painter
- Michael Gumpp (1636–1679), painter
- Franz Gumpp (1649–1665), painter
- Johann Martin the Older (1643–1729), architect
- Johann Baptist (1651–1728), engraver
- Johann Anton (1654–1719), painter.

His grandchildren Johann Martin Gumpp the Younger (1686–1765) and Georg Anton Gumpp (1682–1754) were also noted architects.

The builder and architect Elias Gumpp (1609–1676) was Christoph the Younger's brother. Together, they published a description of the Puster Valley (around 1660), and rebuilt the Lienz Valley Fortification (1664–1665).

The position of architect to the Tyrolean and later Austrian court was filled by members of three consecutive generations of the Gumpp family (Christoph Gumpp the Younger, Johann Martin and Georg Anton). Therefore, a typical family style of design and construction techniques shows in Tyrolean baroque architecture of that time.

== Buildings ==
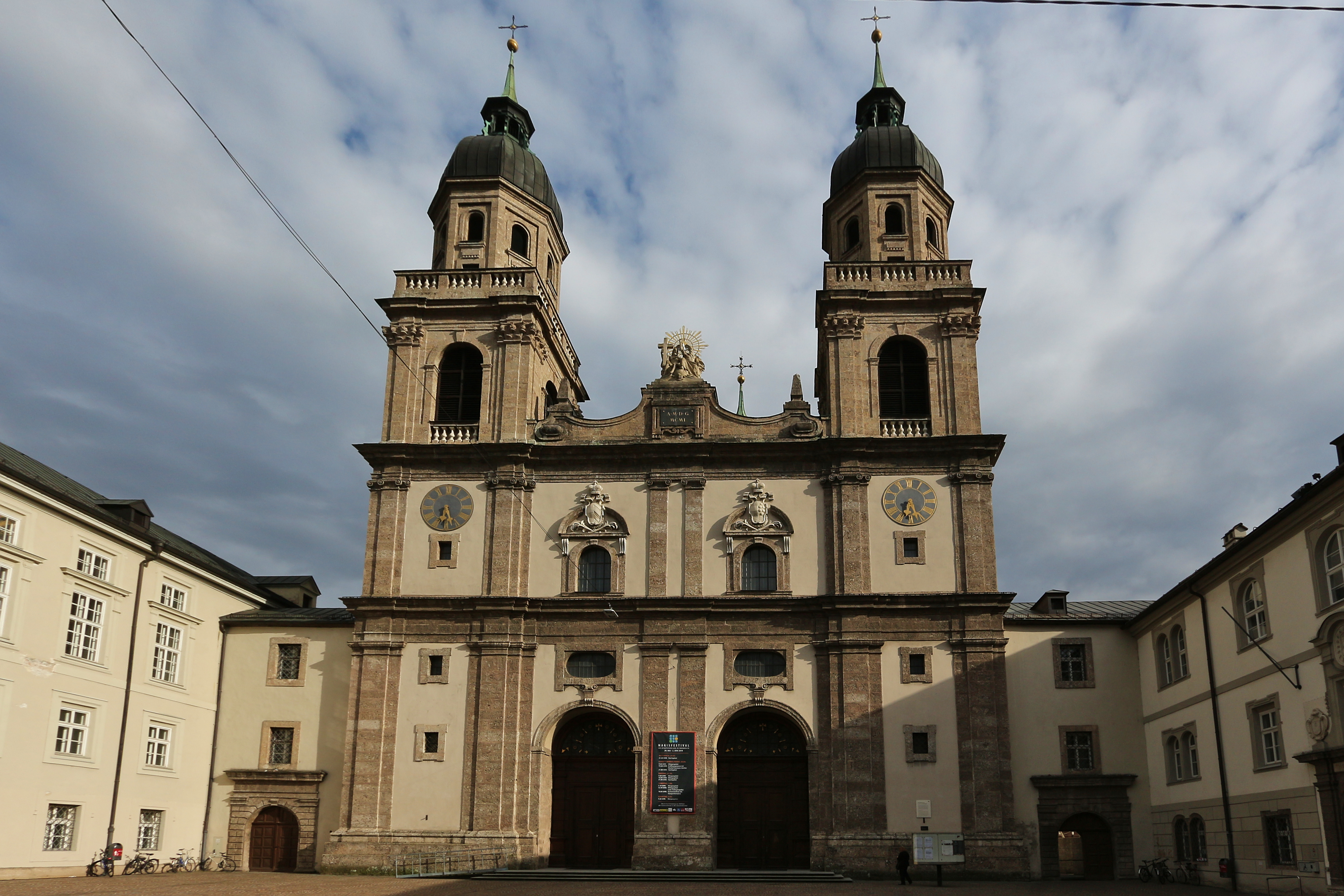
Facade of the Jesuit Church, Innsbruck

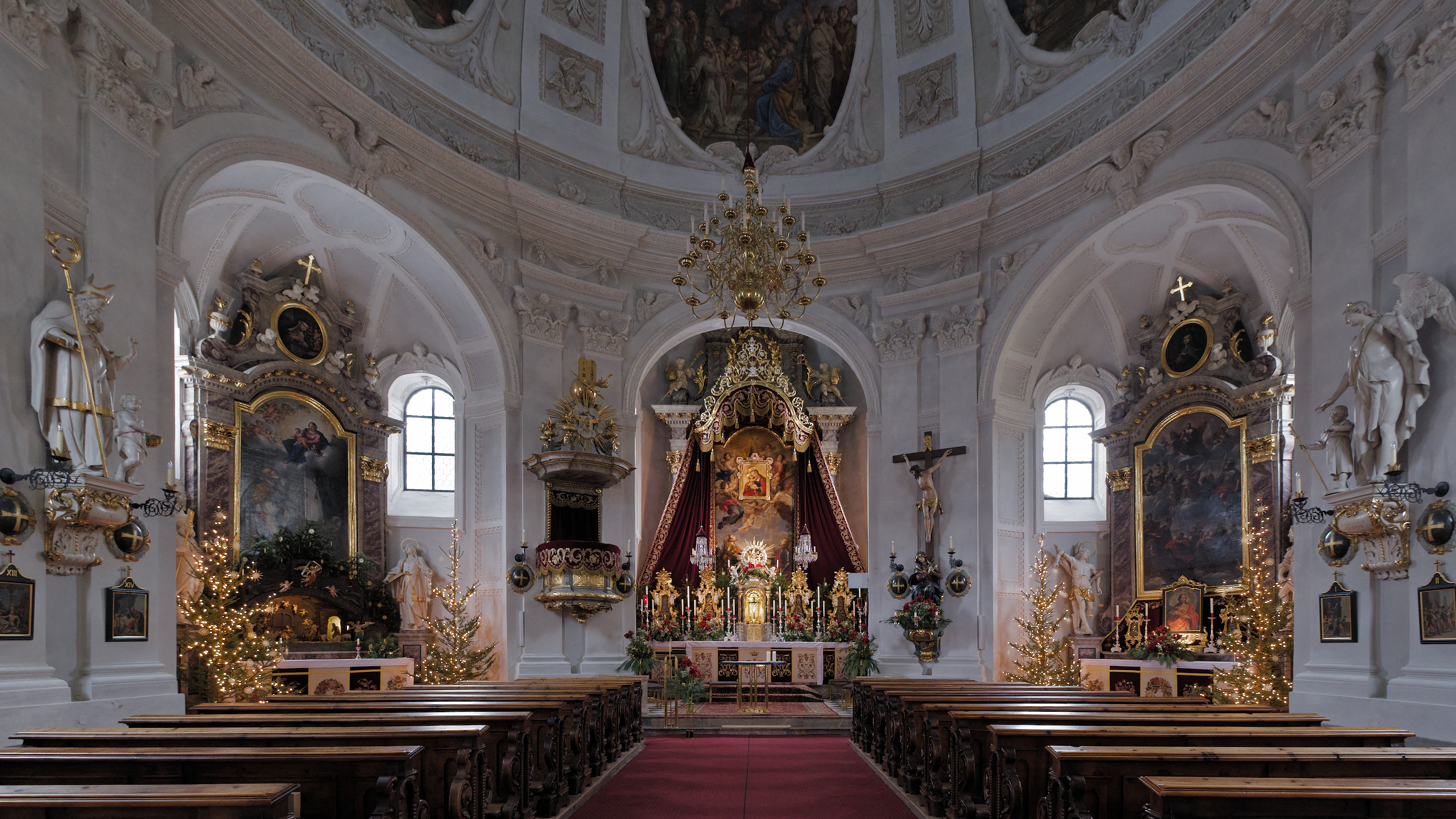
St Mary's Parish Church (Mariahilfkirche), Innsbruck

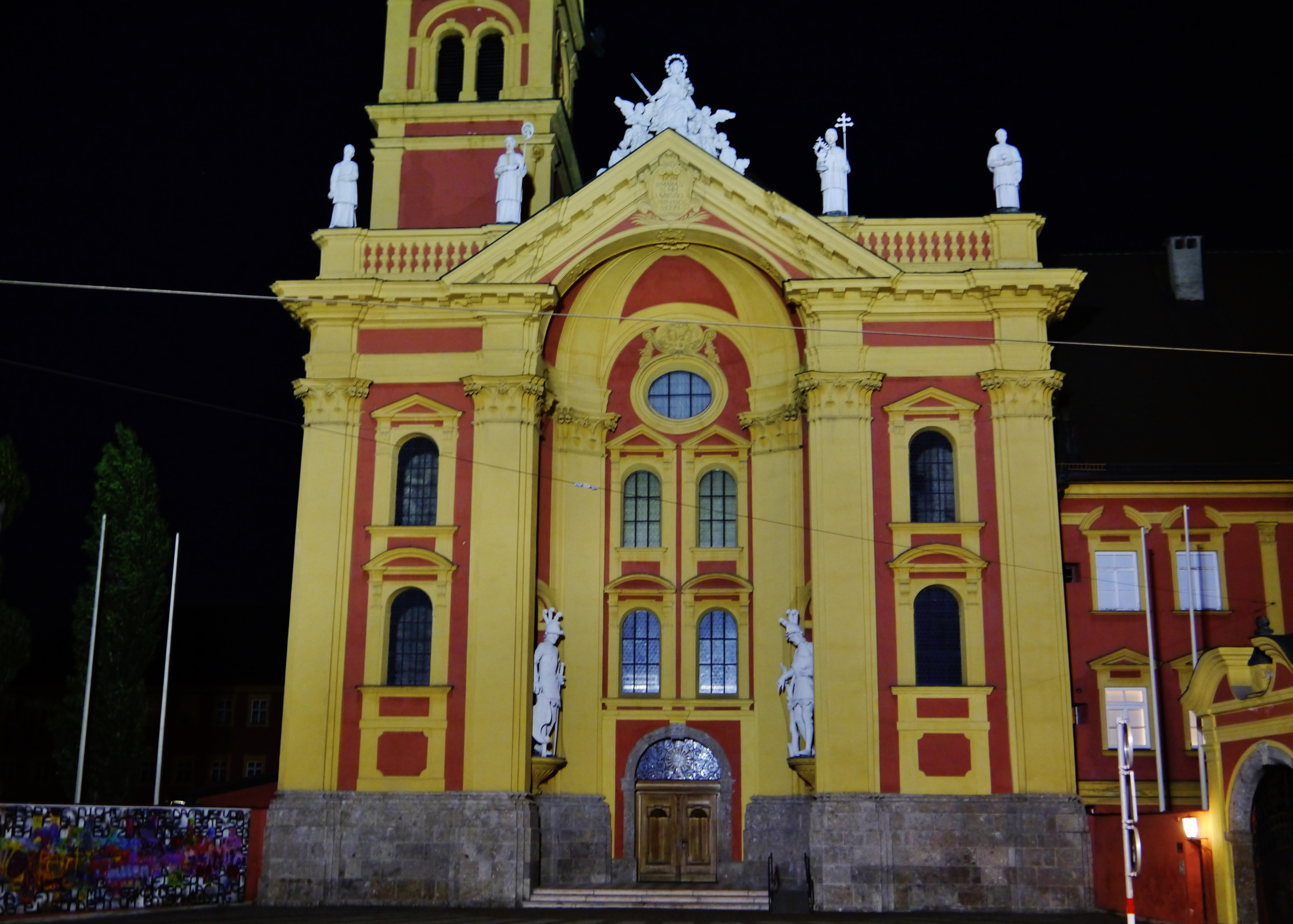
Wilten Basilica (Wiltener Basilika, Stifstkirche Wilten), Innsbruck
