= Alessandro De Marchi =

Alessandro De Marchi may refer to:

- Alessandro De Marchi (conductor) (born 1962), Italian conductor
- Alessandro De Marchi (cyclist) (born 1986), Italian professional road and track bicycle racer
