= Laura Polverelli =

Italian operatic mezzo-soprano (born 1967)

Laura Polverelli (born 1967) is an Italian operatic mezzo-soprano who has sung leading roles in the opera houses of Europe and North America and has recorded on the Decca, Naïve, and Opera Rara labels amongst others.

Polverelli was born in Siena. She received her initial training there under Anastasia Tomaszewski Schepis, went on to further training with Carlo Bergonzi and Alfredo Kraus at the Accademia Musicale Chigiana, followed by two years with Rita Hirner-Lill at the Hochschule für Musik und Theater in Munich. She made her debut at the Teatro Comunale di Treviso as Alisa in Lucia di Lammermoor. After winning second prize in the 1993 Neue Stimmen competition, she began an international career, appearing in Germany, France, Austria, and Italy. She made her North American debut in 1996 at Seattle Opera in the title role of Rossini's La Cenerentola. Later that year she sang the title role in Cesti's L'Argia in its first performance in modern times.
