= Boris Goudenow =

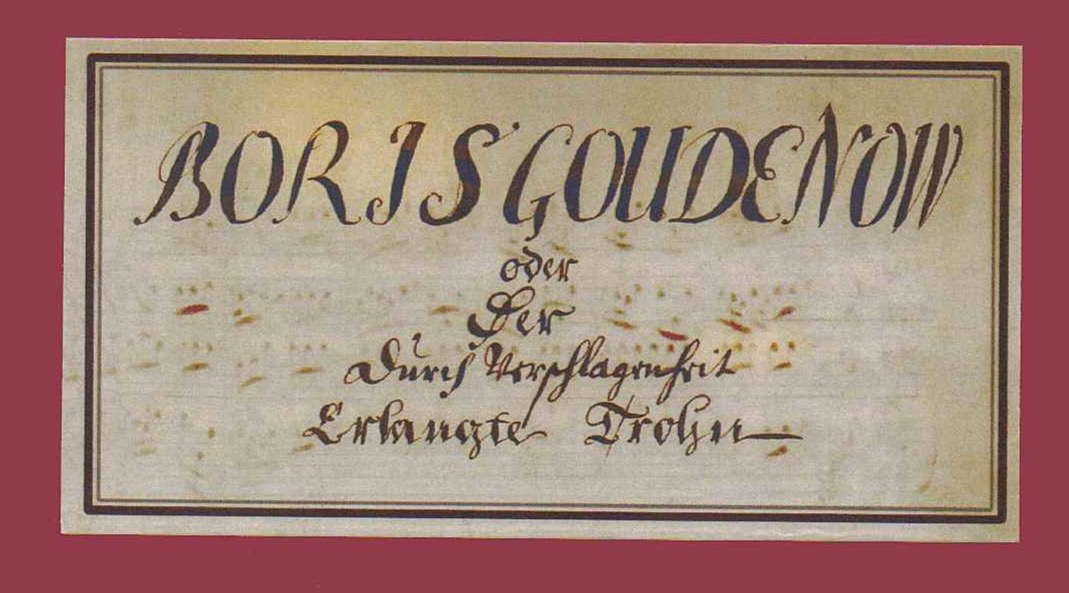
Title page of Mattheson's score, c. 1710

Boris Goudenow is a German-language opera composed in 1710 by Johann Mattheson. The plot concerns intrigues among tsars Feodor I and Boris Godunov and tsarina Irina Godunova, and a cast of Russian, Danish and Swedish nobles. It was never performed during Mattheson's life – possibly due to concerns about Hamburg's relations with Russia. The manuscript, taken to the Soviet Union at the end of World War II, was discovered in Armenia. The opera was finally premiered in 2005 in concert in Hamburg, then a scenic premiere in Boston under Stephen Stubbs. It was given the first European scenic performance at the Innsbruck Festival of Early Music by Concerto Theresia under Andrea Marchiol in 2021. A recording of this performance was issued by cpo.
