= L'Argia =

1655 opera

- Opera by Antonio Cesti
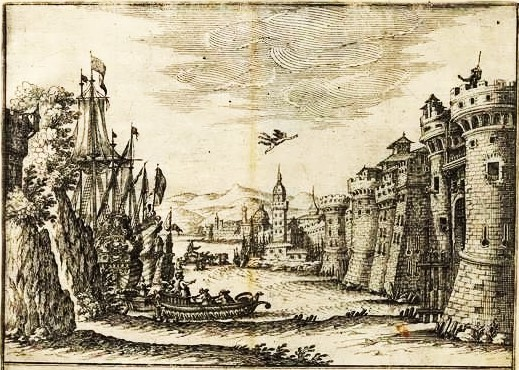
- Stage set for Act 1, Scene 1 of the premiere performance
- Librettist: Giovanni Filippo Apolloni
- Premiere: 4 November 1655; Hoftheater, Innsbruck

L'Argia is an opera in a prologue and three acts composed by Antonio Cesti to a libretto by Giovanni Filippo Apolloni. It was first performed in the court theatre at Innsbruck on 4 November 1655 to celebrate the visit of Queen Christina of Sweden who was on her way to exile in Rome. Over the next 20 years it had multiple performances in Italian cities including Venice and Siena where it inaugurated Siena's new opera house in 1669. Its first performance in modern times took place at the Innsbruck Festival of Early Music in 1996. Set on the Island of Cyprus in ancient times the opera's convoluted plot, full of disguises and mistaken identities, revolves around the amorous misadventures of Selino who has been pursued to Salamis by his deserted wife Princess Argia.

== Background and premiere ==
At the time of the opera's first performance both the composer Antonio Cesti and its librettist Giovanni Filippo Apolloni were in the service of Ferdinand Charles, Archduke of Austria at his court in Innsbruck—Cesti from 1652 and Apolloni from 1653. L'Argia was their first operatic collaboration there. It was part of a week of festivities in November 1655 celebrating the visit of Queen Christina of Sweden who had abdicated the throne and was on her way to exile in Rome. On 3 November she formally converted to Catholicism in the Hofkirche at Innbruck. The following evening L'Argia was performed at the Archduke's new theatre which had been inaugurated the previous year and stood on the site of today's Tiroler Landestheater. The English cleric and traveller John Bargrave was in Innsbruck at the time and attended the performance. He later wrote:

That night she [Queen Christina] was entertayned with a most excellent opera, all in musick, and in Italian, the actors of that play being all of that nation, and, as some of themselves told me, they were seven castrati or eunuchs; the rest were whoores, monks, fryers, and priests. I am sure it lasted about 6 or 7 hours, with most strangely excellent scenes and ravishing musick.

The production began with a prologue consisting of a dialogue between Thetis and Amor praising the virtues of Queen Christina. The opera itself had lavish stage machinery and multiple ballets and choruses incorporated into the action. Apart from Dorisbe which was sung by Anna Renzi and King Atamante which was sung by Cesti himself, all the principal roles, including the title role of Princess Argia were sung by male castrato singers. The production was such a success that it was repeated on 7 November, the night before Christina left for Rome. It was her introduction to Italian dramma per musica, and she became a notable patron of the art form after she settled in Rome.

== Performance history ==
L'Argia was subsequently revived multiple times in Italy. The libretto was published in Rome in 1657 and excerpts from the opera were performed in private palaces. There are copies of the libretto printed for public performances in Naples (1667), Venice (1669), Milan (1669), Siena (1669) Viterbo (1670 and 1680), Reggio (1671), Verona (1671), Udine (1673), and Pisa (1674). There is also a record of an opera by that name performed in the small court theatre in Mantua in 1674. The soprano Giulia Masotti, a friend of both Cesti and Apolloni, was a great admirer of the work and did much to champion its performances in Italy. She was instrumental in securing its Venice premiere in 1669 and in having it performed in Siena later that year to inaugurate the city's new opera house.

By the time of the Venice premiere at the Teatro San Luca on 15 January 1669, L'Argia had become something of a legend in Italy. Apolloni and Cesti adapted the title role (originally sung by a castrato) for Masotti. The opera itself was also adapted to suit Venetian taste. While some new arias were added for Masotti, several others were shortened or eliminated. Most of the lengthy recitatives were also eliminated, and the final apotheosis with Venus and Innocence was omitted, as it was in all the post-1655 Italian revivals. The original prologue praising Queen Christina was substituted with a new one set in Apollo's library on Mount Parnassus with each of the five prologue characters taking a volume of music from the shelves and singing an aria from it. (Note: Two of the arias chosen for the new Venice prologue were from Antonio Draghi's Il ratto delle Sabine, composed that year but not premiered until 1674.) The Venice production was very successful, with an opening night audience of over 950 people and a six-week run of 35 performances.

The opera's first performance in modern times was on 18 August 1996 at the Tyrolean State Theatre during the Innsbruck Festival of Early Music directed by Jean-Louis Martinoty with Laura Polverelli in the title role. The performing edition was prepared by René Jacobs who also conducted the performance. He cut the original version of the opera down from a running time of almost seven hours to approximately four, eliminating the prologue and most of the choruses. Jacobs subsequently took the Innsbruck production and cast to Opéra de Lausanne in Switzerland in 1997 and the Théâtre des Champs-Élysées in Paris in 1999 (the opera's first performance in France).

== Roles ==
| Role | Voice type | Premiere cast 4 November 1655 |
|---|---|---|
| Atamante, King of Cyprus | tenor (Note: Tenor voices in the Baroque era often had a much lower range than the modern tenor and were more like that of the modern baritone.) | Antonio Cesti |
| Dorisbe, his daughter | soprano | Anna Renzi |
| Selino, son of the King of Thrace but actually Lucimoro, son of Atamante | contralto castrato | Filippo Bombaglia, "Monello" |
| Argia, abandoned wife of Selino and Princess of Negroponte, disguised as the young servant Laurindo | high contralto castrato (en travesti) (Note: High contralto voices in the Baroque era were similar to that of the modern mezzo-soprano. In the 1996 revival of L'Argia, Argia was sung by a mezzo-soprano (Laura Polverelli), while Filaura was sung by a soprano (Darina Takova).) | Antonio Pancotti |
| Feraspe, Prince of Negroponte and Argia's brother | contralto castrato | Astolfo Bresciani |
| Aceste, Feraspe's squire | tenor | |
| Solimano, Selino's tutor in Thrace | bass | |
| Dema, Dorisbe's aged nurse | tenor | |
| Lurcano, King Atamante's servant and jester | contralto castrato | Tomaso Bovi |
| Filaura, a singer and courtesan, favourite of Atamante | high contralto | |
| Alceo, a eunuch and servant of Filaura | soprano | |
| Osmano, an old shepherd but once the tutor of Lucimoro | bass | |
| Venere (Venus) | high contralto | |
| Innocenza (Innocence) | high contralto | |
sailors, soldiers, numen (singing); buffoons, cherubs, ghosts, soldiers (dancing)

== Synopsis ==
Setting: Salamis on the Island of Cyprus in ancient times

Selino, whose real name was Lucimoro, is the son of Atamante, King of Cyprus but was kidnapped by pirates as a small child and later adopted by the King of Thrace. On a visit to the Island of Negroponte where he had been sent to learn foreign customs and languages, Selino had seduced Princess Argia, married her, and then abandoned her when she became pregnant. In his subsequent wanderings Selino arrives in Salamis and promptly falls in love with King Atamante's daughter Dorisbe, not realising that she is actually his sister.

After recovering from childbirth, Argia, determined to track down her errant husband, leaves her baby son in the care of the old shepherd Osman. Unbeknownst to her, Osman had been the slave at Atamante's Court charged with taking care of Lucimoro/Selino and had fled to Negroponte when he was blamed for the child's kidnapping. Argia's brother Prince Feraspe arrives in Salamis, partly to look for her and partly to seek the hand of the beautiful Dorisbe. Argia also arrives in the city disguised as a young man called Laurindo. Both Dorisbe and Filaura (King Atamante's courtesan) fall in love with "him". In the end, all is resolved. As she is about to wreak her revenge on Selino, Argia falls into his arms instead and the two are reconciled. Osman arrives with their young son. Atamante is thrilled to have found his son, and Selino is equally delighted to have found his real father. Dorisbe becomes the happy bride of Feraspe.

In the final scene, Venus descends from the heavens accompanied by Innocence. They describe the happy turn of events and sing "Viva Cyprus and Negroponte!", echoed by choruses of divine spirits, dancing soldiers, and cherubs flying overhead.
