= Antonio Cesti =

Italian composer, singer and organist (1623–1669)

- Baptised: Pietro Cesti; 5 August 1623; Arezzo
- Died: 14 October 1669; Florence
- Occupations: Composer, singer, organist

Antonio Cesti (Italian pronunciation: [anˈtɔːnjo ˈtʃesti]; baptised Pietro Cesti, 5 August 1623; died 14 October 1669), known today primarily as an Italian composer of the Baroque era, was also a singer (tenor) and organist. He was "the most celebrated Italian musician of his generation".

== Biography ==
He was baptised Pietro Cesti at Arezzo on 5 August 1623. Claims that he studied with Giacomo Carissimi "appear to be groundless".

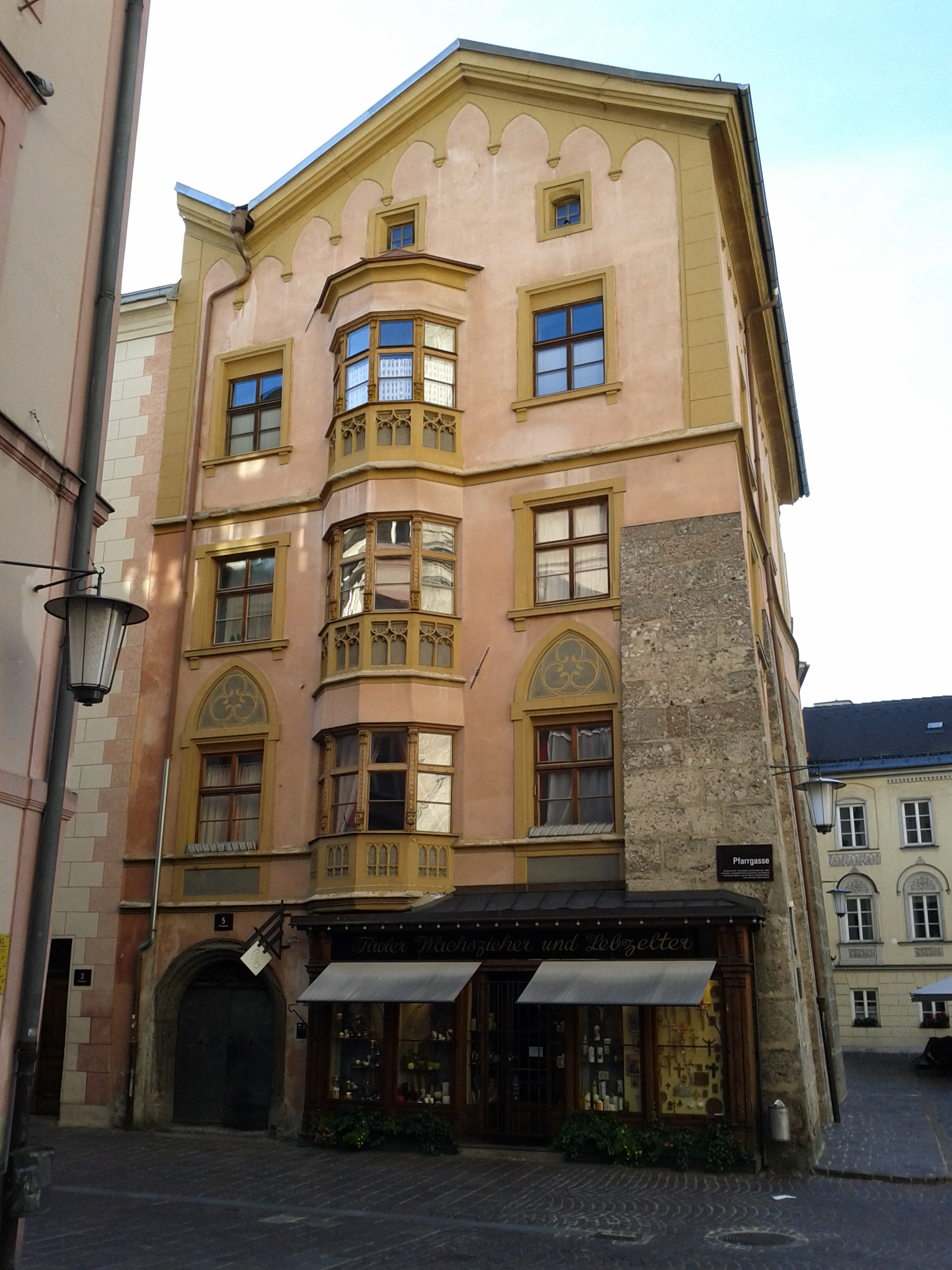
Cesti's house in Innsbruck

In 1637, he joined the Order of Friars Minor, or Franciscans, a Roman Catholic religious group founded by Francis of Assisi, and took the name Antonio. (He has also been referred to as 'Marc' Antonio', but this is incorrect.) While he was in Volterra, he turned more toward secular music, perhaps due to the patronage and influence of the powerful Medici family. Here, he also came in contact with Salvator Rosa, who wrote libretti for a number of Cesti's cantatas. By 1650, Cesti's calling as a Franciscan friar and his success as a singer and composer for operas were coming into conflict, and he was officially reprimanded.

In 1652, he became a member of the court at Innsbruck of Ferdinand Charles, Archduke of Austria. One of his Innsbruck residences was the still existing Cesti House in Pfarrgasse 5.

After holding a post somewhere in Florence as maestro di cappella, he entered the papal chapel in 1660. In 1666, he became Vice-Kapellmeister at Vienna, and died at Florence in 1669.

== Music ==
Cesti is known principally as a composer of operas. The most celebrated of these were La Dori (Innsbruck, 1657), Il pomo d'oro (Vienna, 1668) and Orontea (1656). Il pomo d'oro (The Golden Apple) was written for the wedding in Vienna of Emperor Leopold I in 1666, and first performed in 1668, in a famously lavish production. It was far more elaborate than contemporary Venetian operas, including a large orchestra, numerous choruses, and various mechanical devices used to stage things like gods descending from heaven (deus ex machina), naval battles, and storms.

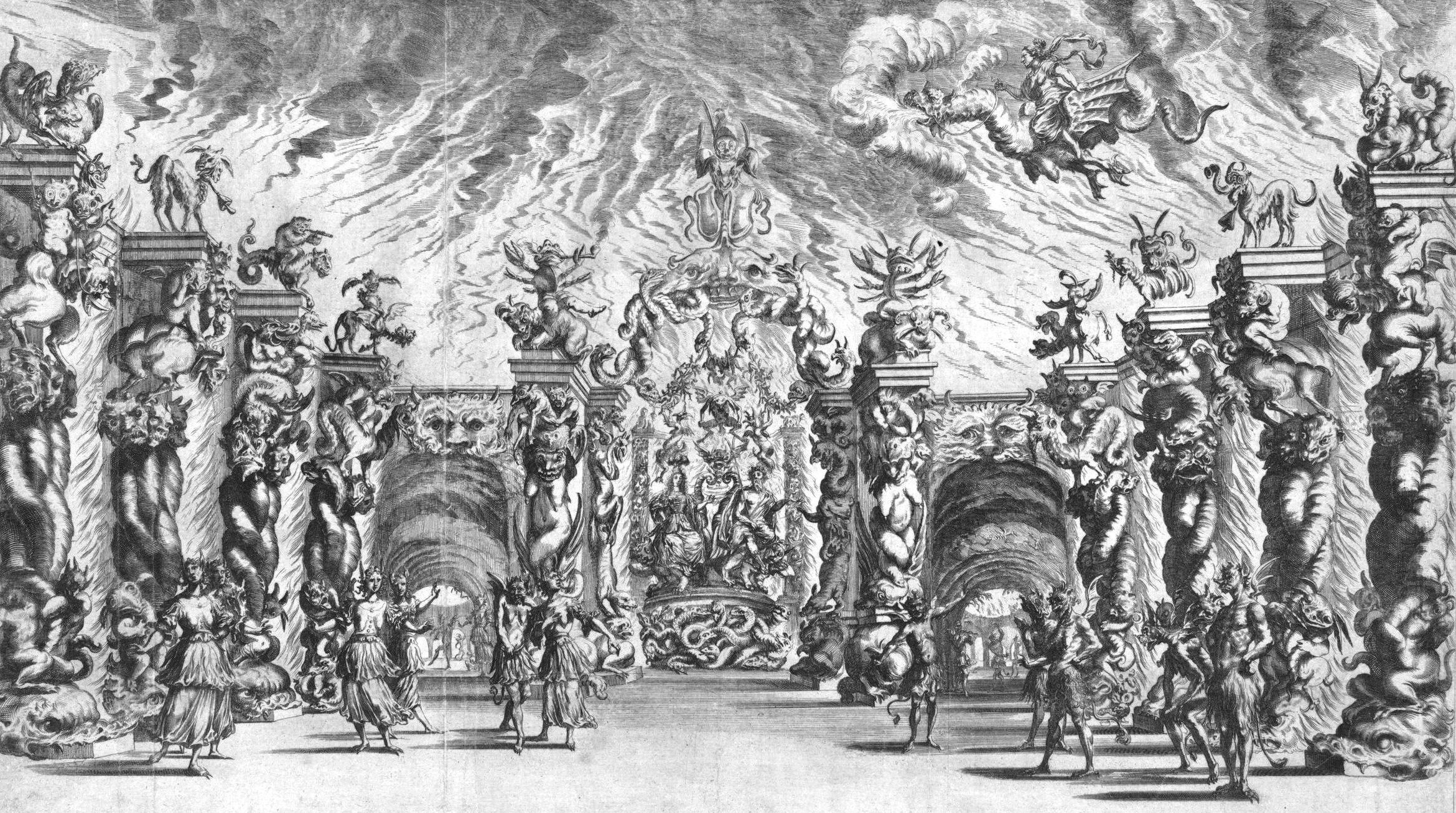
Scenography for Il pomo d'oro

Orontea was revived seventeen times in the next thirty years, making it one of the most frequently performed operas on the continent in the mid-17th century. Even Samuel Pepys owned a copy of the score. It includes a well-known soprano aria "Intorno all'idol mio" ("Around my idol").

Cesti was also a composer of chamber cantatas, and his operas are notable for the pure and delicate style of their airs, more suited to the chamber than to the stage. He wrote in the bel canto style of the 17th century, and his compositions were heavily influenced by his career as a professional singer. His musical writing owes much to the emerging tonality of the time.

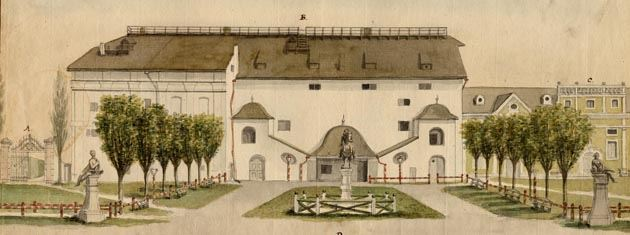
New Court Theater Innsbruck

Cesti composed several of his operas for the new court theatre Neues Komödienhaus at Innsbruck which was commissioned by Archduke Ferdinand Charles based on plans of local architect Christoph Gumpp the Younger. That theatre was – yet unfinished – inaugurated in 1654 with the performance of Cesti's opera La Cleopatra. It was the first detached opera house in the German-speaking area with salaried staff and was later replaced by another theatre. In 1655, Cesti's opera L'Argia was premiered in Innsbruck on the visit of the Swedish Queen Christina to celebrate her conversion to Catholicism.

As singer, Cesti performed roles in tenor and later also bass voice.

The yearly competition Internationaler Gesangwettbewerb für Barockoper Pietro Antonio Cesti for singers was named after him. It was established in 2010 by the conductor Alessandro De Marchi.

== Works ==
Title	Libretto	Première date	Place, theatre	Notes
Alessandro vincitor di se stesso	Francesco Sbarra	1651	Venice, Teatro Santi Giovanni e Paolo	
Il Cesare amante	Dario Varotari	1651	Venice, Teatro Grimano	
Cleopatra	Dario Varotari	1654	Innsbruck	revised version of Il Cesare amante
L'Argia	Giovanni Filippo Apolloni	1655	Innsbruck	
Marte placata	Giovanni Filippo Apolloni	1655	Innsbruck	
Orontea	Giacinto Andrea Cicognini, revised by Giovanni Filippo Apolloni	19 February 1656	Innsbruck	revived in Innsbruck in 1982 (René Jacobs) and recorded for HM; revived in Frankfurt in 2015 (Ivor Bolton)
La Dori	Giovanni Filippo Apolloni	1657	Innsbruck	
Venere cacciatrice	Francesco Sbarra	1659	Innsbruck	lost
La magnanimità d’Alessandro	Francesco Sbarra	1662	Innsbruck	
Le nozze in sogno	Pietro Susini	1665	Florence, Accademia degli Infuocati	
Il Tito	Nicolò Beregan	13 February 1666	Venice, Teatro Grimano	
Nettuno e Flora festeggianti	Francesco Sbarra	12 July 1666	Vienna	
Le disgrazie d'Amore	Francesco Sbarra	19 February 1667	Vienna	
La Semirami	Giovanni Andrea Moniglia	9 July 1667	Vienna	revised 1674 in Modena as La schiava fortunata
La Germania esultante	Francesco Sbarra	1667	Vienna	
Il pomo d'oro	Francesco Sbarra	12–14 July 1668	Vienna	Acts III and V lost
Genserico	Nicolò Beregan	1669	Venice	

== Recordings ==
- Pietro Antonio Cesti "Pasticcio", Festwochen der Alten Musik in Innsbruck 1980, excerpts from operas "Il pomo d'oro", "Argia", "Tito", "Orontea", "Dori", "Semirami". Performers: René Jacobs, Judith Nelson, William Christie, Konrad Junghänel. ORF Edition Alte Musik.
- Le disgrazie d’amore, Auser Musici, Carlo Ipata, director, Hyperion CDA67771 (2010)
- Alma Mia, Raquel Andueza, soprano with La Galania directed by Fernández Baena: excerpts from operas L'Argia, La Dori, Orontea, Il Tito, and two cantatas: Non si parli più d'Amore and Ò quanto concorso. Anima e Corpo AeC003 (2014)
- L'Orontea Frankfurter Opern und Museumsorchester, Ivor Bolton (director), OEHMS Classics (2017)
- La Dori Accademia Bizantina, Ottavio Dantone (director), CPO (2020)

== See also ==
- Baroque opera
- Francesco Cavalli
- Claudio Monteverdi, an older contemporary of Cesti
