= Giacinto Andrea Cicognini =

Italian playwright and librettist

Giacinto Andrea Cicognini (1606–1651) was an Italian playwright and librettist, the son of poet and playwright Jacopo Cicognini.

== Biography ==
Giacinto Andrea Cicognini was born in Florence. In 1627, he graduated from the University of Pisa, and he lived in Florence from 1640 to 1645 where he had legal advice to the poet and playwright Giambattista Ricciardi. In 1646 he wrote his first libretto, Il Celio, which was set to music by Sapiti and Baglioni. In autumn 1646, Cicognini moved to Venice, where he began work as the secretary of Francesco Boldieri, a nobleman who handled the property of the Knights Hospitallers of St. John of Jerusalem. In Venice Cicognini participated in the cultural activities of the Accademia degli Incogniti, ‘which functioned as an unofficial seat of political power’. His fame began to grow, as both playwright and librettist, and his output of plays, tragedies, comedies, and librettos was almost all for theatres and opera houses in Venice. His works were set to music by some of the most famous composers of the day, including Francesco Cavalli, Antonio Cesti, Barbara Strozzi, and Francesco Lucio. He died in Venice.

Cicognini was one of the most important figures in seventeenth-century opera, where he brought together elements of tragedy and comedy, and often shows signs of Spanish influence. His most famous works are Giasone (set to music by Cavalli, 1649) and Orontea (set to music by Lucio, 1649 and Cesti, 1656), which were to become the two most popular operas in 17th century Europe.
