= Johannes Gumpp =

Austrian painter

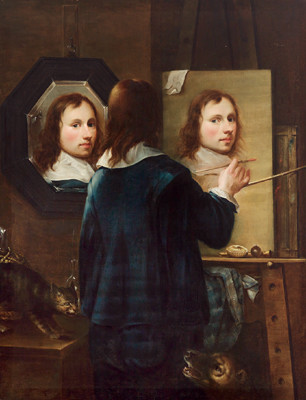
- Rectangular version of the self-portrait, in a private collection
- Born: 14 August 1626; Innsbruck, Austria
- Known for: Painting

Johannes Gumpp (14 August 1626 – after 1646) was an Austrian painter.

He is notable for his 1646 self-portrait showing him looking into a mirror while painting himself. The painting is on display in the Vasari corridor which connects to the Uffizi Gallery, Florence. He created another similar painting and is known for no other works.

Gumpp was born in Innsbruck and was the son of Christoph Gumpp, an architect. He was likely part of the same Gumpp family that produced artists in the 16th and 18th centuries.

== Bibliography ==
- Rave, Paul Ortwin, Das Selbstbildnis des Johannes Gumpp in den Uffizien, Pantheon, 18, 1960 pp. 28–31.
- Gli Uffizi Catalogo generale, N° A437, page 883, Florence, 1980, Centro Di ISBN 88-7038-021-1.
- D. T., Saur, Allgemeines Künstler Lexikon, Saur, Munich-Leipzig, 2009, volume 65, p. 48.
