= Der geduldige Socrates =

Comic opera by Georg Philipp Telemann

- Comic opera by Georg Philipp Telemann
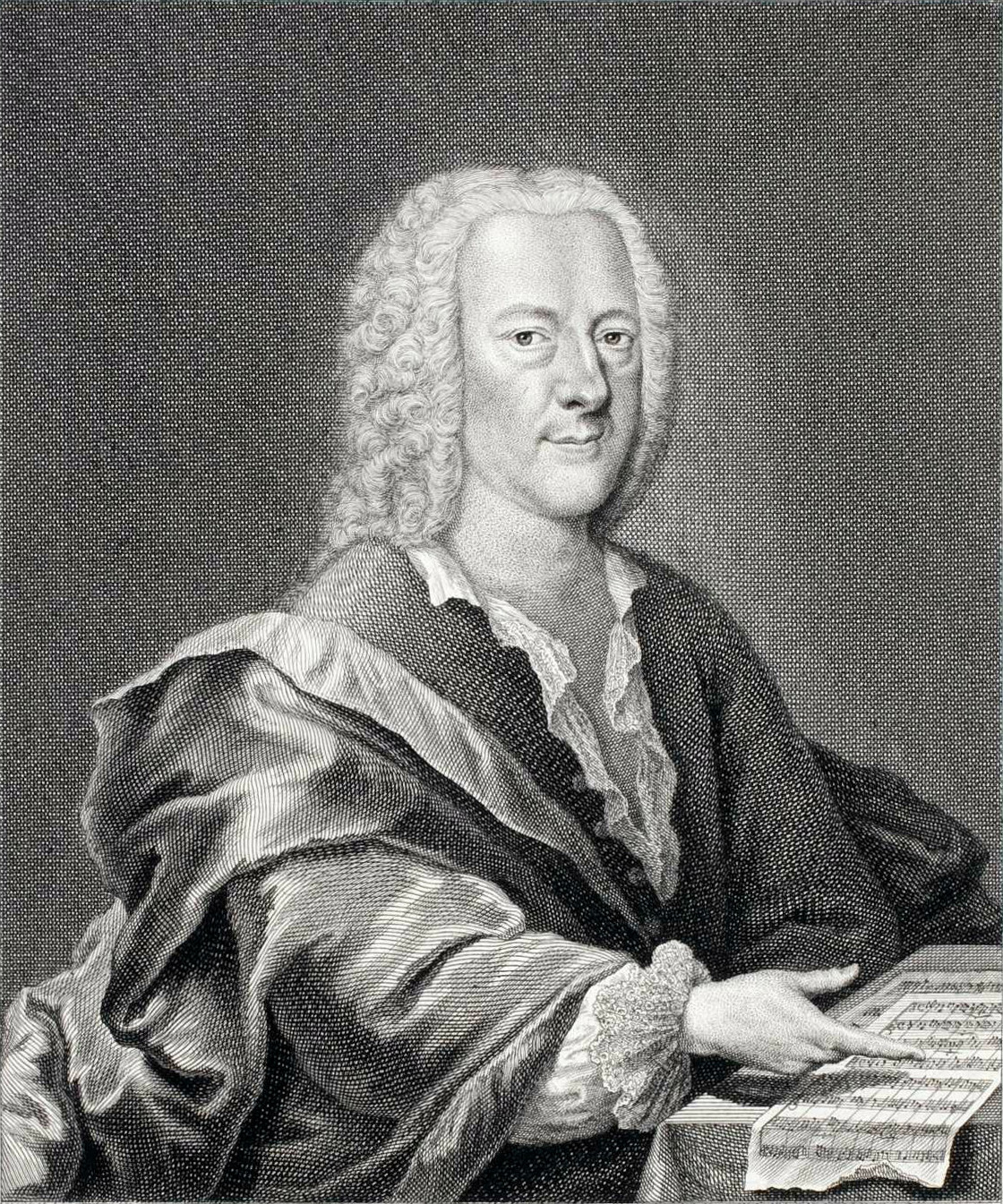
- The composer, c. 1745
- Translation: The patient Socrates
- Librettist: Johann Ulrich von König
- Language: German
- Premiere: 1721; Oper am Gänsemarkt, Hamburg

Der geduldige Socrates (TVWV 21:9, Hamburg 1721) is a comic German-language opera in three acts by Georg Philipp Telemann to a libretto by Johann Ulrich von König.

The opera was Telemann's first full length purely comic opera, and was performed at the Oper am Gänsemarkt, while Reinhard Keiser was still running the opera.

The professional UK premiere was in 1974 by Kent Opera conducted by Roger Norrington, with April Cantelo, Thomas Lawlor and Linda Esther Gray among the cast.

== Recordings ==
- Der geduldige Socrates – Jozsef Gregor, Éva Vámossy, Katalin Farkas, Éva Bártfai-Barta, Julia Paszthy, Guy de Mey, Paul Esswood, István Gáti, Capella Savaria Nicholas McGegan, Hungaroton 1987
