= Orontea =

Opera by Antonio Cesti

- Opera by Antonio Cesti
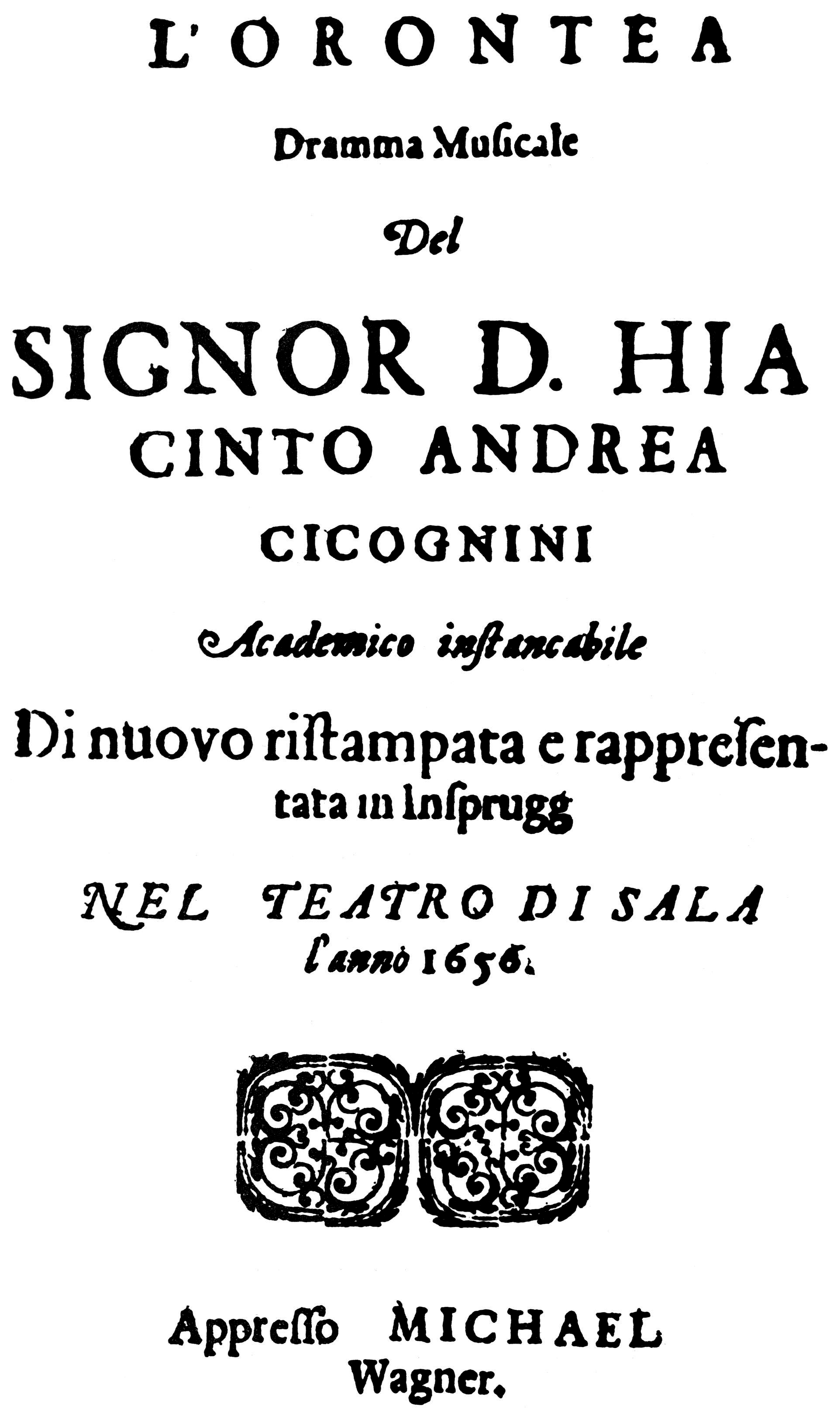
- Title page of the 1656 libretto
- Librettist: Giacinto Andrea Cicognini
- Premiere: 19 February 1656; Hoftheater, Innsbruck

Orontea is an opera in a prologue and three acts by the Italian composer Antonio Cesti with a libretto by Giacinto Andrea Cicognini (revised by Giovanni Filippo Apolloni).

== Performance history ==
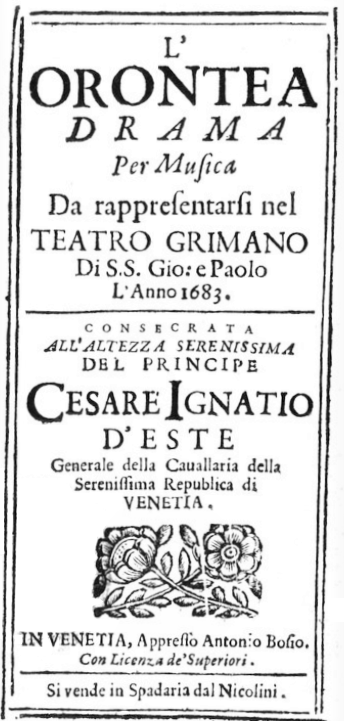
Libretto printed for the 1683 production at the Teatro Santi Giovanni e Paolo in Venice

The first performance took place in Innsbruck on 19 February 1656. Orontea was one of the most popular Italian operas of the 17th century. It includes well-known soprano arias such as "Intorno all'idol mio", "Addio Corindo" and "Il mio ben dice ch'io speri". It was revived more than 17 times before 1700, including in Genoa, Rome, Florence, Turin, Milan, Bologna, Venice, Palermo, Naples, Hannover.

Almost all of the score was lost, and the opera was forgotten; then several manuscripts were discovered in the 1950s.

Modern performances started in 1961 at the Piccola Scala in Milan with Teresa Berganza and Carlo Cava, Bruno Bartoletti conducting. René Jacobs conducted a 1982 production in Innsbruck, and Ivor Bolton in 2015 at Oper Frankfurt. The work was first performed in Australia by Pinchgut Opera in 2022. The opera was given in the 2023/2024 season of the Teatro alla Scala in Milan, conducted by Giovanni Antonini, directed by Robert Carsen and Stéphanie d'Oustrac in the title role. A free video is available for streaming at LaScalaTv.

== Roles ==
Roles, voice types, premiere cast
Role	Voice type	Premiere cast
La filosofia (Philosophy)	soprano	
Amore (Love)	soprano	
Orontea, Queen of Egypt	soprano	
Alidoro, a young painter	tenor	Antonio Cesti
Silandra, a courtesan	soprano	
Corindo, a courtier	alto castrato	
Creonte, a philosopher	bass	
Aristea, Alidoro's presumed mother	contralto	
Giacinta, disguised as a boy	soprano	
Gelone, a fool	bass	
Tibrino, a page	soprano	

== Synopsis ==
=== Prologue ===
Philosophy and Love argue which of them has more power over mankind.

=== Act 1 ===
Queen Orontea renounces love, even though her chief adviser Creonte urges her to marry for the good of the kingdom. The young painter Alidoro arrives at the court seeking refuge from brigands with his presumed mother Aristea. He explains how he had to flee from the court of Queen Arnea of Phoenicia. In spite of vow, Orontea finds herself falling in love with Alidoro, as does the courtesan Silandra.

=== Act 2 ===
Giacinta, disguised as the boy "Ismero", arrives at Orontea's court and explains she was behind the ambush of Alidoro, having been sent to kill him by the Queen of Phoenicia. Orontea can barely restrain herself from killing Giacinta with a sword. Creonte now guesses the queen is in love with Alidoro and reproaches her for choosing a commoner. Aristea falls in love with "Ismero". Meanwhile, Alidoro paints a portrait of Silandra. Orontea, mad with jealousy, bursts in during the sitting and he faints. She repents and leaves Alidoro a crown and a letter confessing her love.

=== Act 3 ===
Creonte forces Orontea to reject Alidoro. He is discovered to be in possession of a royal medallion and accused of theft. Aristea explains the provenance of the trinket which proves that Alidoro is none other than Floridano, the long-lost son of the King of Phoenicia. As a child he had been kidnapped by a gang of pirates led by Aristea's husband and brought up by her as her own son. He is now free to marry Orontea.

== Recordings ==
- 1982: Orontea, Helga Müller Molinari (Orontea), Gregory Reinhart (Creonte), Cettina Cadelo (Tibrino), Guy de Mey (Aristea), René Jacobs (Alidoro), Gastone Sarti (Gelone), David James (Corindo), Andrea Bierbaum (Filosofia), Isabelle Poulenard (Silandro), Jill Feldman (Giacinta), Concerto Vocale, conducted by René Jacobs (Harmonia Mundi)
- 2015: L'Orontea, Paula Murrihy (Orontea), Sebastian Geyer (Creonte), Juanita Lascarro (Tibrino, Amore), Guy de Mey (Aristea), Xavier Sabata (Alidoro), Simon Bailey (Gelone), Matthias Rexroth (Corindo), Louise Alder (Silandra), Kateryna Kasper (Giacinta), Katharina Magiera (Filosofia), Frankfurter Opern- und Museumorchester, Monteverdi-Continuo-Ensemble, conducted by Ivor Bolton (OehmsClassics)
- 2024 (4k video): L'Orontea, Stéphanie d’Oustrac (Orontea), Mirco Palazzi (Creonte), Francesca Pia Vitale (Silandra), Hugh Cutting (Corindo), Luca Tittoto (Gelone), Sara Blanch (Tibrino), Marianna Pizzolato (Aristea), Carlo Vistoli (Alidoro), Maria Nazarova (Giacinta), Teatro alla Scala, conducted by Giovanni Antonini, directed by Robert Carsen (LaScalaTv)

== Sources ==
- William C. Holmes, "Antonio Cesti: Orontea", pp. 195–196, in The Viking Opera Guide, edited by Amanda Holden (Viking, 1993)
- Booklet notes to the 1982 recording conducted by René Jacobs.
