= Alessandro De Marchi (conductor) =

Italian conductor

Alessandro De Marchi (born 1962) is an Italian conductor, best known for his interpretation of baroque oratorios and operas, as leader of the Academia Montis Regalis orchestra, and director of the orchestra's foundation in Mondovì, Mons Regalis, one of the oldest towns of Piedmont. He was a student of the Accademia Nazionale di Santa Cecilia in Rome and the Schola Cantorum Basiliensis. Since 2010 De Marchi has succeeded René Jacobs as director of the Innsbruck Festwochen der Alten Musik.

In addition to recordings with his home ensemble of Italian baroque works, De Marchi has recorded Rossini's Torvaldo e Dorliska and La pietra del paragone (The Touchstone) with the Czech Chamber Soloists, Brno and conducted Mozart's La clemenza di Tito in Prague.
