= René Jacobs =

Belgian musician (born 1946)

- Jacobs in Salzburg, 2011
- Born: 30 October 1946 (age 80); Ghent, Belgium
- Occupations: Countertenor; Conductor; Academic teacher
- Organizations: Concerto Vocale; Berlin State Opera, and collaborated with La Monnaie in Brussels and Theater an der Wien
- Awards: Grammy Award; Telemann Prize; Handel Prize

René Jacobs (born 30 October 1946) is a Belgian musician. He came to fame as a countertenor, recording both the standard repertoire as well as rarely performed sacred music and operas in historically informed performances. He taught interpretation and Baroque singing style at the Schola Cantorum Basiliensis. From 1988 he also taught at the Centre de Musique Baroque de Versailles.

In 1977 he founded the Concerto Vocale and conducted them first in sacred music, later also in early operas. He became principal guest conductor and artistic adviser for Baroque repertoire at the Berlin State Opera, and collaborated with La Monnaie in Brussels and Theater an der Wien, among others. He focused on less-known Baroque operas, also exploring works by Mozart and Rossini. A recording of Mozart's Le nozze di Figaro earned him a Grammy Award, among many others. He was awarded the Handel Prize for his work for Handel's operas, and the Telemann Prize for his contributions to performing Telemann's music internationally.

== Biography ==
=== Countertenor ===
Born in Ghent on 30 October 1946, Jacobs began his musical career as a boy chorister at the Cathedral. He said in an interview that he learned there with ease more music than under pressure at conservatories. He studied classical philology at the Ghent University while simultaneously studying voice in Brussels with Louis Devos and in Den Haag with Lucie Frateur. He worked for three years as a teacher of Greek and Latin.

The Kuijken brothers, Gustav Leonhardt and Alfred Deller all encouraged him to pursue a career as a countertenor, and he quickly became known as one of the best of his time. He recorded a large amount of less-known Baroque music by such composers as Antonio Cesti, Sigismondo d'India, Benedetto Ferrari, Luca Marenzio, Michel Lambert, Pierre Guédron, William Lawes and others. He also sang in much-acclaimed recordings of the major works of Bach, such as the St Matthew Passion, led by Philippe Herreweghe in 1984, with the Collegium Vocale Gent, and by Leonhardt in 1989, with La Petite Bande.

=== Conductor ===
In 1977, Jacobs founded the ensemble Concerto Vocale. In 1982 he conducted the first opera, Cesti's Orontea at the Innsbruck Festival of Early Music. He was artistic director of the festival's opera programs from 1991 to 2009. Jacobs was invited by the Berlin State Opera from 1993 as principal guest conductor and artistic adviser for Baroque repertoire, where he led Telemann's Orpheus, Graun's Cesare e Cleopatra, and Mozart's Così fan tutte. At La Monnaie in Brussels he conducted in 1993 Cavalli's La Calisto in a production also played in Berlin, at the Liceu in Barcelona, at the Opéra National de Lyon and the Opéra national de Montpellier. In 2004 he conducted there the composer's Eliogabalo, also presented at the Innsbruck Festival. He was a regular conductor at the Theater an der Wien from 2006.

As a conductor, Jacobs recorded numerous operas and sacred and secular works of the 16th, 17th and 18th centuries. His recording of Mozart's Le nozze di Figaro is especially renowned, having won such awards as Gramophone's Record of the Year for 2004, Le Monde de la musique's Choc of the Year for 2004, a Grammy Award for "Best Opera recording of 2005", and two Midem Classical Awards in 2004. Other award-winning recordings include Handel's Rinaldo (Cannes Classical Award, 2004), and Haydn's The Seasons (Diapason d'Or of 2005). He received the "III Premio Traetta 2011", and numerous European awards. His recording of Mozart's Die Zauberflöte was Record of the Year at the inaugural International Classical Music Awards in April 2011. Jacobs is particularly noted as a singer's conductor, and for his handling of recitative.

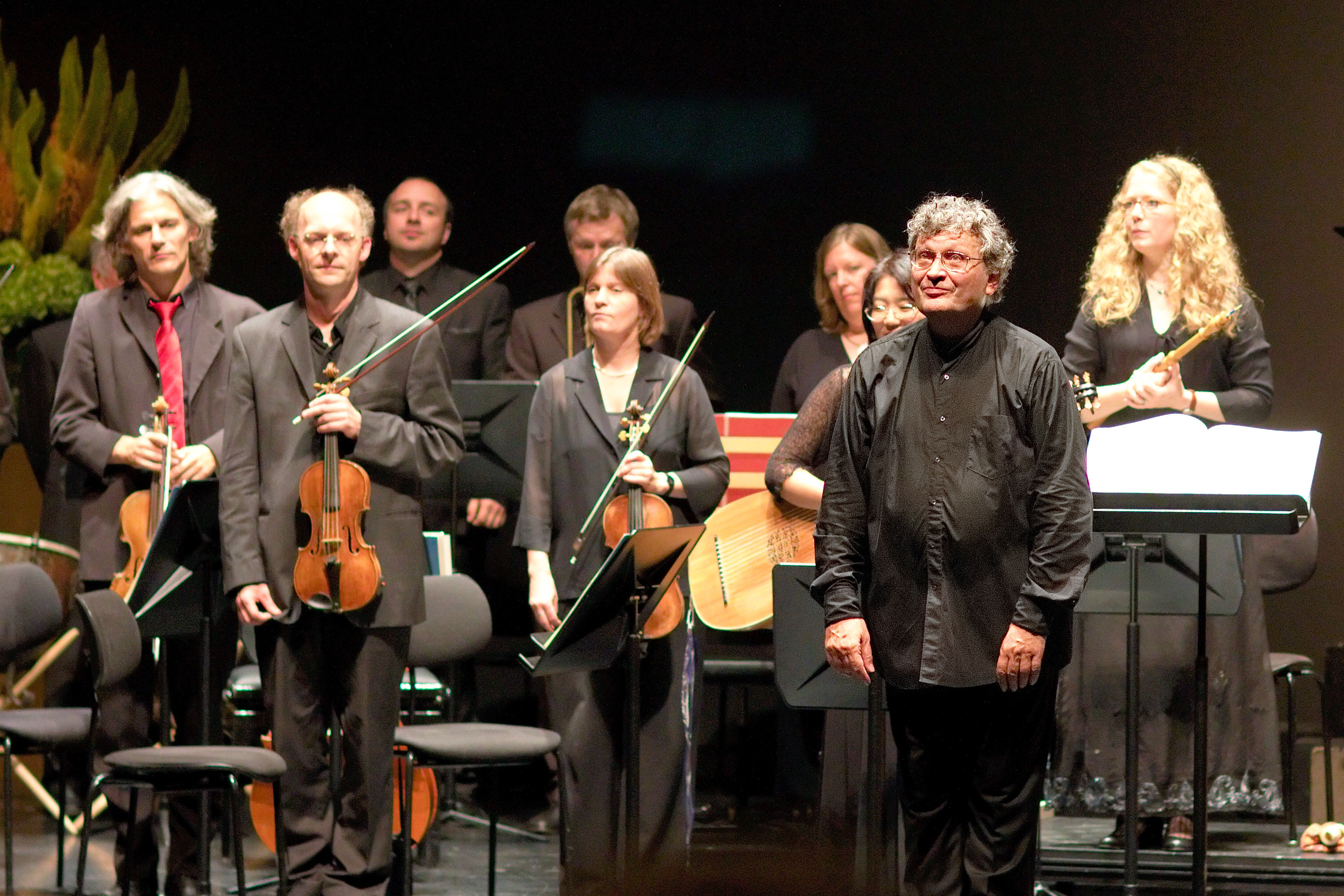
Jacobs in Salzburg, 2011

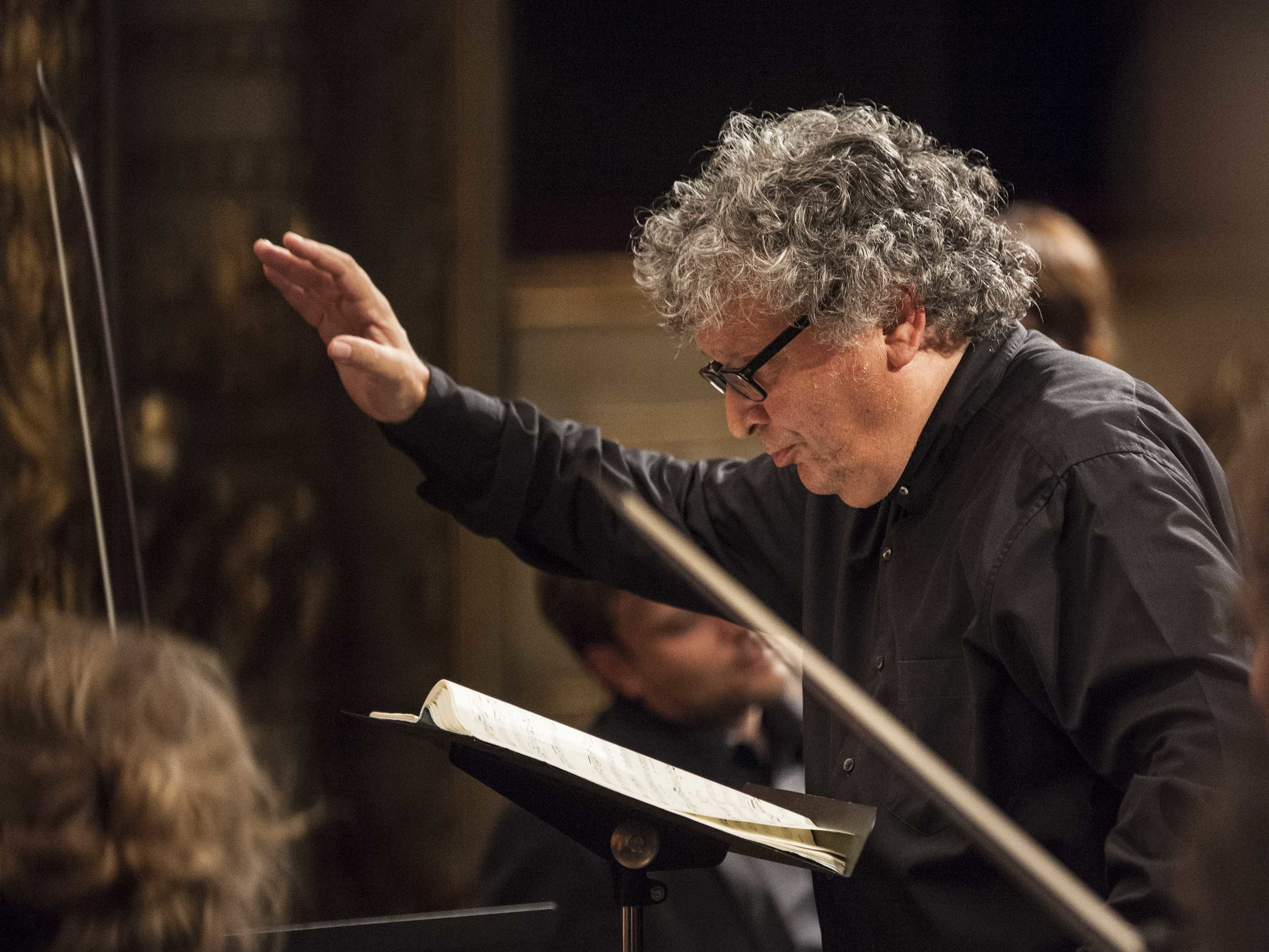
Jacobs, 2014

Jacobs regularly conducted orchestras and ensembles such as the Concerto Köln, the Orchestra of the Age of Enlightenment, Akademie für Alte Musik Berlin, Nederlands Kamerkoor, RIAS Kammerchor, and Freiburger Barockorchester for recordings and concert tours.

Jacobs taught interpretation and Baroque singing style at the Schola Cantorum Basiliensis. From 1988 he also taught at the Centre de Musique Baroque de Versailles. He received an honorary doctorate from the Ghent University.

He was awarded the Telemann Prize of Magdeburg for his contributions to performing Telemann's music internationally. He received the Oper! award for his life's achievements in 2023. In 2026, he was awarded the Handel Prize of Halle for his work, as singer, conductor and artistic director, for the understanding of Baroque vocal music, especially in works by Handel; his recordings of Handel operas became reference recordings.

== Recordings ==
Recordings with Jacobs include:

=== Countertenor ===
- Charpentier: 3 Leçons de Ténèbres du Mercredy Sainct, H.96, H.97, H.98, 3 Répons du Mercredy Sainct, H.111, H.112, H.113, 3 Leçons de Ténèbres du Jeudy Sainct, H.102, H.103, H.109, Judith Nelson, Concerto Vocale (recorded 08/1977 and 01/1978) 3 LP Harmonia Mundi HM 1005/6/7
- Charpentier: 3 Leçons de Ténèbres du Vendredy Sainct, H.105, H.106, H.110, 6 Répons du Mercredy Sainct. H.114, H.115, H.116, H.117, H.118, H.119, Judith Nelson, Concerto Vocale (Volume 2, recorded 01/1978 and 01/1979) 2 LP Harmonia Mundi HM 1008/09
- Charpentier: Motets à voix seule et à 2 voix, Judith Nelson, Concerto Vocale. CD Harmonia Mundi 1984 HMC 901149
- Charpentier : David et Jonathas H.490, (La Pythonisse), English Bach Festival Orchestra, conducted by Michel Corboz – 2 CD Erato 1982 report 2010.
- Couperin: 3 Leçons de Ténèbres, Concerto Vocale. CD Harmonia Mundi 1984
- Gluck: Orfeo ed Euridice with Marjanne Kweksilber, Magdalena Falewicz, and La Petite Bande conducted by Sigiswald Kuijken, Collegium vocale – 2 LP Accent 1982
- Handel: Tamerlano with John Elwes, Henri Ledroit, Mieke van der Sluis, Isabelle Poulenard, Gregory Reinhart, and La Grande Ecurie et La Chambre Du Roy conducted by Jean-Claude Malgoire – 3 LP CBS Masterworks 1984
- Handel: Alessandro with Sophie Boulin, Isabelle Poulenard, Jean Nirouët, Stephen Varcoe, Guy de Mey, Ria Bollen, and La Petite Bande conducted by Sigiswald Kuijken – 4 LP Deutsche Harmonia Mundi 1985
- Handel: Admeto with Jill Gomez, Rachel Yakar, James Bowman, Max van Egmond, Ulrik Cold, and Il Complesso Barocco conducted by Alan Curtis – 5 LP EMI 1978
- Handel: Partenope with Krisztina Laki, John York Skinner, Helga Müller-Molinari, Stephen Varcoe, Martyn Hill, and La Petite Bande conducted by Sigiswald Kuijken – 4 LP Deutsche Harmonia Mundi 1979

=== Conductor ===
- Bach – Mass in B minor
- Bach – Christmas Oratorio (Choc du Monde de la Musique; ClassicsToday.com)
- Bach – The Motets (award: Diapason d'Or)
- Bach – Secular cantatas
- John Blow – Venus and Adonis
- Buxtehude – Membra Jesu Nostri
- Antonio Caldara – Maddalena ai piedi di Cristo (awards: Gramophone Award; Diapason d'or)
- Cavalli – La Calisto (awards: Cannes Classical Award; Diapason d'or)
- Cavalli – Giasone (1988)
- Cavalli – Serse – (awards: Choc du Monde de la Musique; Diapason d'or; Un événement Télérama (ffff))
- Antonio Cesti – Cantatas
- Cesti – Orontea
- Gluck – Orfeo ed Euridice (awards: Cannes Classical Awards)
- Alessandro Grandi – Vulnerasti cor meum and other sacred music
- Handel – Giulio Cesare
- Handel – Messiah
- Handel – Rinaldo ((awards: Cannes Classical Award)
- Handel – Saul ((awards: Editor's choice Gramophone; Choc du Monde de la musique; BBC Music Magazine Disc of the Month (October 2005))
- Handel – Orlando ((awards: DG Archiv)
- Haydn – Die Jahreszeiten (awards: Choc du Monde de la Musique; Edison Classical Music Award; Gramophone Award)
- Haydn – Die Schöpfung
- Haydn – Symphonies Nos. 91 and 92 (awards: Choc du Monde de la Musique; Preis der deutschen Schallplattenkritik; Preis der deutschen Schallplattenkritik)
- Keiser - Croesus (awards: Edison Classical Music Award; Diapason d'or)
- Monteverdi – L'Orfeo (awards: Choc 2006)
- Monteverdi – Il ritorno d'Ulisse in patria (Diapason d'or; Preis der deutschen Schallplattenkritik)
- Monteverdi – L'incoronazione di Poppea
- Monteverdi – Vespro della Beata Vergine
- Monteverdi – Madrigals
- Mozart – Così fan tutte (Cannes Classical Awards; Diapason d'or; Edison Classical Music Award)
- Mozart – Le nozze di Figaro (awards: 47th Grammy Award; Choc du Monde de la Musique; Edison Classical Music Award; Gramophone Record of the Year 2004; Preis der deutschen Schallplattenkritik
- Mozart – La clemenza di Tito (awards: Critics award at the Brits Classics 2007; 10 de Classica-Répertoire; Jahrespreis der Deutschen Schallplattenkritik; Un événement Télérama (ffff)
- Mozart – Don Giovanni (awards: Gramophone Record of the Month, October 2007; Classics Today 10/10)
- Mozart – Symphonies Nos. 38 and 41 (awards: 10 de Classica-Répertoire; Diapason d'Or Arte)
- Mozart – Idomeneo (awards: Scherzo, Choc de Classica, Un événement Télérama (ffff)
- Pergolesi – Stabat Mater
- Purcell – Dido and Aeneas; (awards: Editor's choice Gramophone; Un événement Télérama (ffff)
- Scarlatti – Il primo omicidio (overo caïn) (awards: Diapason d'or; Editor's choice Gramophone; Gramophone Award; Le Timbre de Platine
- Scarlatti – Griselda (awards: 10 de Répertoire; Diapason d'or; Le Timbre de Platine)
- Schubert – Symphonies 1 & 6, Pentatone PTC 5186707 (2018)
- Schubert – Symphonies 2 & 3, Pentatone PTC 5186759 (2020) BBC Radio 3 Record Review Choice of Marina Frolova-Walker 3 October 2020
- Schütz – Christmas Story (awards: Diapason d'or; Un événement Télérama (ffff))
- Zelenka – Magnificat & Lamenti
