= Innsbruck Festival of Early Music =

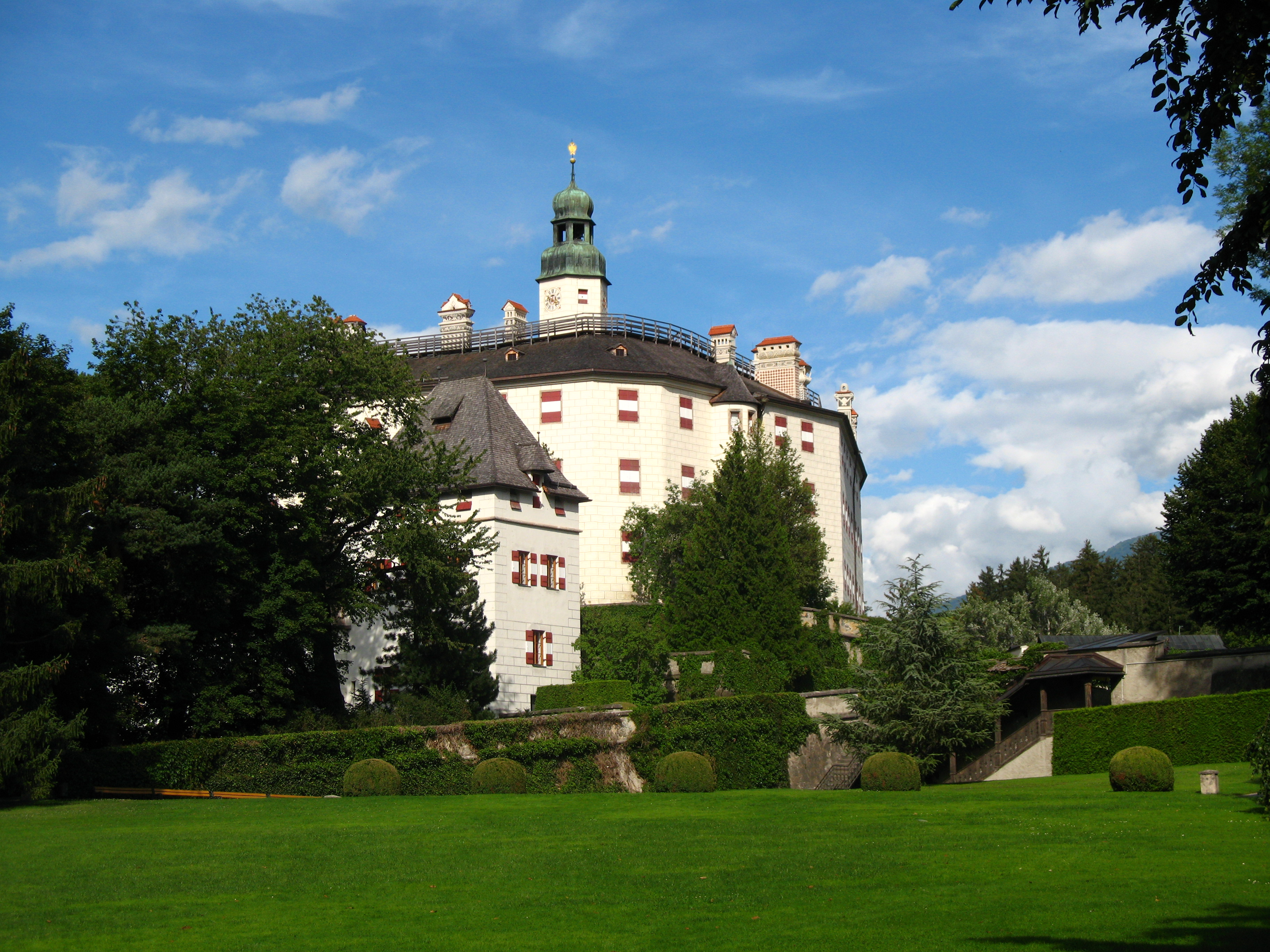
Ambras Castle, one of the festival's main concert venues

The Innsbruck Festival of Early Music (German: Innsbrucker Festwochen der Alten Musik) is a festival of historically informed performances of music from the late Renaissance, Baroque and early Classical periods which takes place annually in Innsbruck, Austria. It was founded in 1976.

== History ==
The festival had its roots in 1963 when the Innsbruck musician Otto Ulf (1907–1993) organized a concert at the Ambras Castle to celebrate the 600th anniversary of Margaret, Countess of Tyrol's bequest of Tyrol to the Dukes of Austria. The Ambras Castle concerts continued over the years and in 1972, he initiated an International Summer Academy in the city. The festival itself was established in 1976 with Ulf as its artistic director. Beginning in 1977 with Handel's Acis and Galatea, the festival's centerpiece has been the production of at least one baroque opera or oratorio. Since then it has played a pioneering role in the revival of Baroque opera.

The Belgian conductor and early music specialist René Jacobs had organized the festival's opera programme from 1991, and was artistic director of the entire festival from 1997 to 2009. In 2010, Alessandro De Marchi succeeded Jacobs as artistic director. Among the conductors who have appeared at the festival are Nikolaus Harnoncourt, Jordi Savall, Sigiswald Kuijken, John Eliot Gardiner and Alan Curtis.

== Operas and concerts ==
Operas which have been performed at the festival (many of them in their first performance in modern times) include Cesti's L'Orontea and L'Argia, Cavalli's Giasone and Serse, Conti's Don Chisciotte in Sierra Morena, Sartorio's Giulio Cesare in Egitto, Handel's Flavio and Rinaldo, Telemann's Orpheus; Hasse's Solimano, Haydn's Il mondo della luna, Mozart's La finta semplice, and Gassmann's L'opera seria

The festival's concerts are often centered on a particular theme. Among those presented in 2015 were "Lachrimae" ("Tears"), melancholy arias and songs from the Baroque and Renaissance periods, and "Die Harfe der Kardinäle" ("The Cardinals' Harp"), 17th-century songs to harp accompaniment composed under the patronage of Cardinals Barberini and Montalto.

== Cesti Competition ==
In 2010, Alessandro De Marchi initiated the festival's International Singing Competition for Baroque Opera Pietro Antonio Cesti. Named for Antonio Cesti, a 17th-century Italian singer and composer who served at the Innsbruck court of Archduke Ferdinand Charles, the competition is open to young singers specialising in the performance of Baroque opera and has a top prize of €4000. Selected finalists also perform the following year in the festival's "Baroque Opera: Young" ("Barockoper: Jung") production which takes place in the inner courtyard of the University of Innsbruck's Theology Faculty. Past "Baroque Opera: Young" productions have included Cesti's Orontea, Lully's Armide, and a double-bill of Purcell's Dido and Aeneas and Blow's Venus and Adonis. Sebastian Schwarz, who has served as Chairman of the Jury was appointed General Director of Glyndebourne Festival Opera in November 2015.

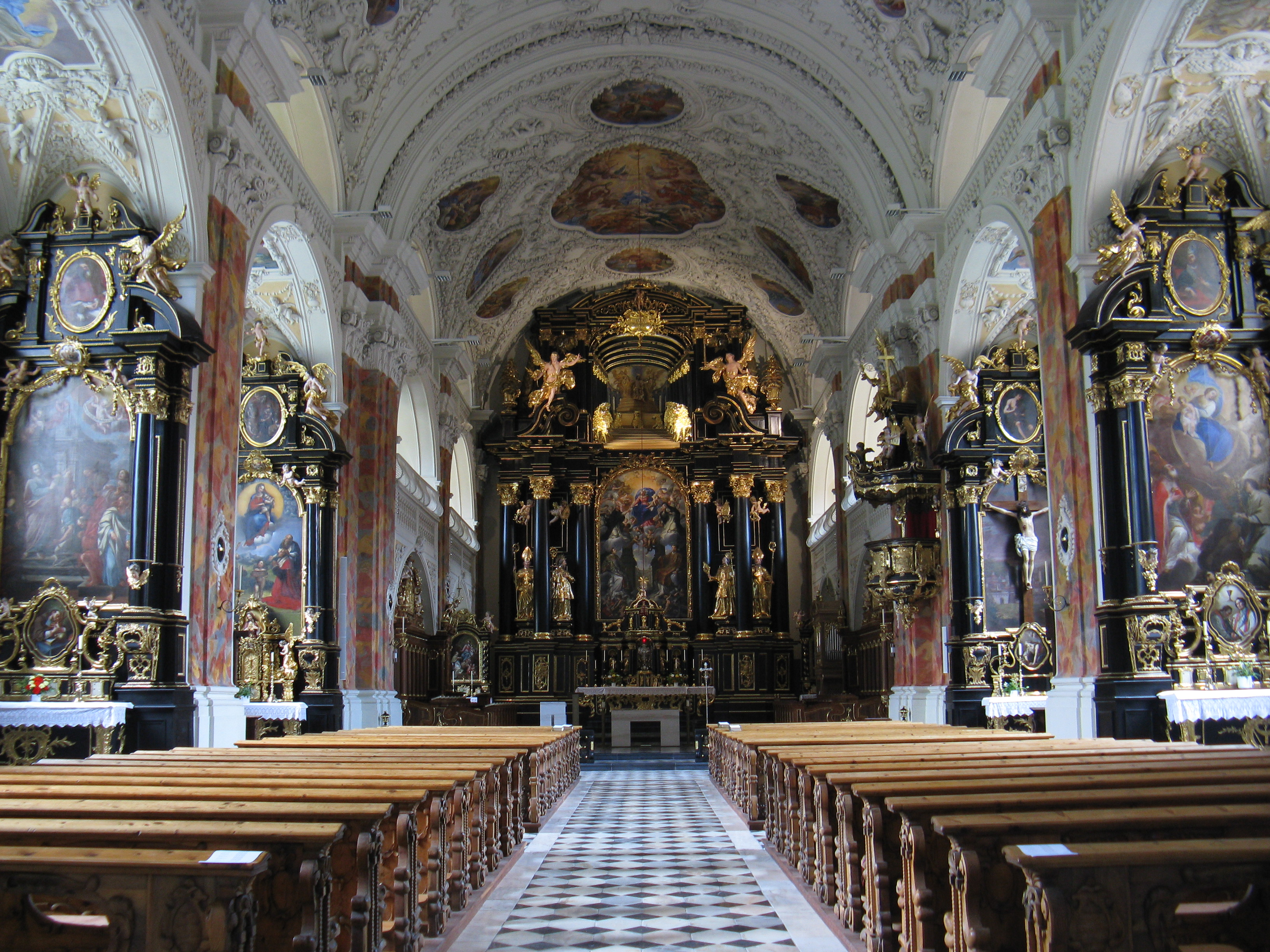
Wilten Abbey Church, where Alessandro Stradella's oratorio Susanna was performed during the 1979 festival

== Venues ==
The festival takes place in several historic venues and churches in and around the city of Innsbruck.

- Ambras Castle, Spanish Hall
- Hofburg, Innsbruck
- Tiroler Landestheater Innsbruck
- Innsbruck Cathedral
- Jesuitenkirche
- Stams Abbey Church
- Inner courtyard of the Theology faculty at the University of Innsbruck
- Hofkirche Innsbruck
- Tiroler Landeskonservatorium (Tirolean State Conservatory) concert hall
- Wilten Abbey Church

== Artistic Directors ==
- 1963–1991: Otto Ulf
- 1991–1996: Howard Arman
- 1997–2009: René Jacobs
- Since 2010: Alessandro De Marchi
