= Artaserse (Hasse) =

Opera by Johann Adolph Hasse (1730)

- Opera by Johann Adolph Hasse
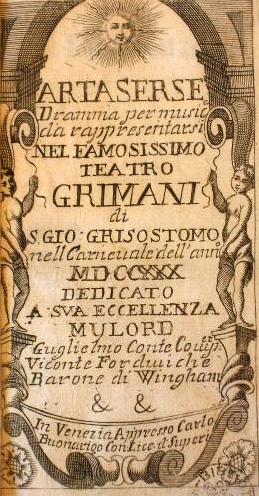
- Title page of the original libretto for Hasse's first setting of the work
- Librettist: Pietro Metastasio (adapted by G. Boldini)
- Premiere: 11 February 1730; Teatro di San Giovanni Grisostomo, Venice

Artaserse is an opera (dramma per musica) in three acts composed by Johann Adolph Hasse to an Italian libretto adapted from that by Metastasio by Giovanni Boldini first shown in Venice on 11 February 1730.

== History ==
Artaserse premiered at the Teatro di San Giovanni Grisostomo in Venice on 11 February 1730, just six days after the libretto's first setting by Leonardo Vinci premiered in Rome.

Hasse wrote three settings of this libretto. The original one dates from 1730, just before he became Kapellmeister in Dresden. A second setting was made for the Court Theatre in Dresden in 1740. Finally, he composed a third one in 1760, when he was nearing the end of his career as Kapellmeister in Dresden.

His style, as well as musical taste, underwent considerable change during those 30 odd years, so much so that not a lot of the 1760 version (Teatro di San Carlo, Naples) sounds like the music of the 1730 and the 1740 versions. For instance, at the end of the first act of the 1760 version, Mandane's accompanied recitative and aria in which she calls upon the ghost of her father, King Xerxes, has been removed. Although this differs from the previous versions, this change actually makes the drama closer to the original by Metastasio.

To those three versions solely by Hasse, one must also add a myriad of pasticcios which use Hasse's setting as a basis, including for instance the notable Autumn 1734 London production put together by Nicola Porpora, starring Farinelli in arias written by Riccardo Broschi, but also, earlier that same year, a production for the Venice Carnival including additional music by Galuppi, starring both Farinelli and Caffarelli.

Hasse's Artaserse, in full or at least in part, was produced in:

- 1730: Venice, Lucca, Milan
- 1731: Brno, Ferrara, Kroměříž
- 1733: Verona
- 1734: Venice and London
- 1735: London
- 1736: London
- 1737: Bergamo
- 1738: Bergamo and Graz
- 1739: Modena
- 1740: Ljubljana and Dresden
- 1745: Ferrara
- 1754: London
- 1760: Warsaw and Naples
- 1762: Naples
- 1765: Ferrara
- 1766: London
- 1772: London
- 1773: London
- 1774: London
- 1779: London
- 1785: London

== Synopsis ==
Artaserse is based on the life of king Artaxerxes I of Persia, a ruler of the fifth century B.C., son of Xerxes I.

Seeing King Serse I's power in serious decline and ambitioning to mount the throne, Artabano, the commander of the royal guards and a powerful official in the Persian court, has murdered the sovereign and is now hoping to sacrifice the rest of the royal family to his design. And so, he accuses Dario, Serses I's eldest son and older brother of Artaserse, of the regicide and persuades the latter to avenge the crime. After Dario's demise, the only thing left wanting is now the death of Artaserse, which Artabano has plotted, but his plans are delayed by a succession of various incidents and in the meantime the treason is revealed.

== Roles ==
Character	Description
Artaserse	Prince and subsequently King of Persia; friend of Arbace and in love with Semira
Mandane	Sister of Artaserse; in love with Arbace
Artabano	Prefect of the Royal Guard; father of Arbace and Semira
Arbace	Brother of Semira; friend of Artaserse; in love with Mandane
Semira	Sister of Arbace; in love with Artaserse
Megabise	General of the Persian army, Artabano's confidant; also in love with Semira

== Aria distribution ==
Color key:

- Artaserse
- Mandane
- Artabano
- Arbace
- Semira
- Megabise
- Duetto / coro
- No aria in the scene
- Scene does not exist

=== In Hasse's settings ===
Act	Scene	Premiere Venice, 1730	2nd version Dresden, 1740	3rd version Naple, 1760
I	1	Conservati fedele		
I	2	Frà cento affanni		
I	3			
I	4			
I	5	Per pieta, bell' idol mio		
I	6	Sogna il Guerrier le schiere		
I	7	Bramar di perdere		
I	8			
I	9			
I	10			Deh respirar, lasciatemi
I	11		Deh respirar, lasciatemi	Non ti son Padre
I	12	Non ti son Padre		Torna innocente, e poi
I	13	Torna innocente, e poi		Se al labbro mio non credi
I	14	Se al labbro mio non credi		Se vendetta io chiedo
I	15	Che pena al mio core		
II	1	Rendimi il caro amico		
II	2	Lascia cadermi in volto		Mi scacci sdegnato!
II	3			
II	4	Amalo, e se al tuo sguardo		
II	5	Non temer, ch'io mai ti dica		
II	6	Se d'un amor tirano		
II	7	Se del fiume altera l'onda		
II	8			
II	9			
II	10			
II	11	Per questo dolce amplesso		Per questo paterno amplesso
II	12	Và trà le selve ircane		
II	13			Non conosco in tal momento
II	14	Non conosco in tal momento		Cosi stupisce e cade
II	15	Pallido il sole		
III	1	Perche tarda è mai la morte	Pensa, che l'amor mio	L'onda dal mar divisa
III	1	Pensa, che l'amor mio	Pensa, che l'amor mio	L'onda dal mar divisa
III	2	Parto: qual pastorello		
III	3	Spiega i lini, abbandona la sponda		Figlio, se piu non vivi
III	4	Figlio, se piu non vivi		Mi credi spietata
III	5	Mi credi spietata		Non è ver, che sia contento
III	6	Non è ver, che sia contento		Tu vuoi ch'io viva o cara (Mandane & Arbace)
III	7	Tu vuoi ch'io viva o cara (Mandane & Arbace)		
III	8			
III	9			
III	10			
III	11	Giusto Rè, la Persia adora (Chorus)		

=== In other productions ===
The arias in bold italic are arias that are not part of Hasse's original opera.

Act	Scene	London 29 Oct. 1734
I	1	**Un' altra volta o Febo**
I	1	Conservati fedele
I	2	**In sen mi tace**
I	3	
I	4	Per pieta, bell' idol mio
I	5	Sogna il Guerrier le schiere
I	5	Bramar di perdere
I	6	Non ti son Padre
I	6	Torna innocente, e poi
I	6	**Se al labbro mio non credi (Broschi)**
I	6	Che pena al mio core
II	1	Rendimi il caro amico
II	2	Lascia cadermi in volto
II	3	Amalo, e se al tuo sguardo
II	3	Non temer, ch'io mai ti dica
II	4	Se d'un amor tirano
II	4	Se del fiume altera l'onda
II	5	Per questo dolce amplesso
II	5	**Ah ingrato crudel**
II	5	Pallido il sole
III	1	Pensa, che l'amor mio
III	1	**Son qual nave che agitata**
III	2	Spiega i lini, abbandona la sponda
III	2	Figlio, se piu non vivi
III	3	Mi credi spietata
III	4	Tu vuoi ch'io viva o cara (Mandane & Arbace)
III	5	**Or la nube procellosa**
III	5	Giusto Rè, la Persia adora (Chorus)

Act	Scene	Venice 1734
I	1	Conservati fedele
I	2	**Se penso al tuo periglio**
I	3	
I	4	
I	5	Per pietà, bell' idol mio
I	6	Sogna il Guerrier le schiere
I	7	Bramar di perdere
I	8	
I	9	
I	10	
I	11	**Deh respirar lasciatemi**
I	12	Non ti son Padre
I	13	Torna innocente, e poi
I	14	**Dimmi che un empio sei**
I	15	**Chi non sente al mio dolore**
II	1	Rendimi il caro amico
II	2	Lascia cadermi in volto
II	3	
II	4	
II	5	Non temer, ch'io mai ti dica
II	6	Se d'un amor tirano
II	7	Se del fiume altera l'onda
II	8	
II	9	
II	10	
II	11	**La sorte mia tiranna**
II	12	Và trà le selve ircane
II	13	
II	14	**Se tu mi voi felice**
II	15	**Cosi stupisce, e cade**
III	1	Perche tarda è mai la morte
III	2	**Lasciar morir l'autore**
III	3	
III	4	Pallido il sole
III	5	Mi credi spietata
III	6	Non è ver, che sia contento
III	7	
III	8	**Quell'ardor che il sen m'accende**
III	9	
III	10	
III	11	
III	12	Giusto Rè, la Persia adora (Chorus)

== Performers and voice types ==
Color key:

- Unknown
- Soprano
- Contralto
- Tenor
- Bass
- Soprano castrato
- Contralto castrato

=== In Hasse's settings ===
Production	Artaserse	Mandane	Artabano	Arbace	Semira	Megabise
Premiere: Venice, 1730	Filippo Giorgi	Francesca Cuzzoni	Nicolò Grimaldi, aka Nicolini	Carlo Broschi, aka Farinelli	Maria Maddalena Pieri, aka ''La Polpetta''	Antonio Castori, aka Castorini
2nd version: Dresden, 1740	Filippo Giorgi	Faustina Bordoni	Domenico Annibali	Ventura Rocchetti, aka Venturini	Sofia Denner	Giovanni Bindi, aka Porporino
3rd version: Naples, 1760	Pietro Santi	Clementina Spagnoli, aka La Spagnoletta	Carlo Carlani	Salvatore Consorti	Dorotea Sabatini	Caterina Flavis

=== In other productions ===
Production	Additional music	Artaserse	Mandane	Artabano	Arbace	Semira	Megabise
Lucca 1730		Andrea Pacini, aka Lucchesino	Anna Maria Peruzzi, aka La Parrucchiera	Pellegrino Tomy, aka Vincentino	Carlo Broschi, aka Farinelli	Lucia Lancetti	Giovanni Ossi
Milan 1730		Gaetano Majorano, aka Caffarelli	Vittoria Tesi, aka La Moretta	Filippo Giorgi	Giovanni Carestini	Anna Maria Peruzzi, aka La Parrucchiera	Catterina Giorgi
Verona 1733		Gioseffa Pircherin, aka La Tedesca	Antonia Negri, aka La Mestrina	Francesco Braganti	Pietro Morigi, aka Il Marchigiano	Eleonora Sarmantina, aka La Polacchine	Andrea Costa
Venice 1734	Galuppi	Gaetano Majorano, aka Caffarelli	Lucia Facchinelli, aka La Beccheretta	Francesco Tolve	Carlo Broschi, aka Farinelli	Teresa Pieri, aka ''La Polpetta''	Antonio Baldi
London 1734	Broschi; Porpora	Antonio Montagnana	Francesca Cuzzoni	Francesco Bernardi, aka Senesino	Carlo Broschi, aka Farinelli	Francesca Bertolli, aka La Chicchina	Maria Segatti
Ljubljana 1740		Domenico Battaglini	Carlina Valvasori	Pasqual Negri	Barbara Naziri	Antonia Negri, aka La Mestrina	
London 1754		Ms Passerini	Caterina Visconti, aka La Viscontina	Ottavio Albuzzi	Pietro Serafini	Giulia Frasi	Mr Ranieri
Ferrara 1765		Giuseppe Guspelti	Lucrezia Agujari, aka La Bastardella	Pietro Tibaldi	Antonio Francia, aka Perellino	Luigia Fabris	Adolfo Hasse, aka Il Sassone
London 1766		Gasparo Savoj	Clementina Spagnoli, aka La Spagnoletta	Ercole Ciprandi	Filippo Elisi	Caterina Visconti, aka La Viscontina	Ms Ghiretti

== Recordings ==
- Hasse, J A: Artaserse (1730 Venice version). Orchestra Internazionale d'Italia, conductor: Corrado Rovaris. Anicio Zorzi Giustiniani (tenor) as Artaserse, Maria Grazia Schiavo (soprano) as Mandane, Sonia Prina (contralto) as Artabano, Franco Fagioli (countertenor) as Arbace, Rosa Bove (mezzo-soprano) as Semira, Antonio Giovannini (countertenor) as Megabise. Recording date: July 2012, Festival della Valle d'Itria, Martina Franca. release: 2016, Label: Dynamic Cat. CDS7715/1–3 (CD), 37715 (DVD).
- Hasse: Artaserse (1740 Dresden version). Orchestra of the Antipodes, conductor: Erin Helyard. David Hansen (countertenor) as Arbace, Vivica Genaux (mezzo-soprano) as Mandane, Carlo Vistoli (countertenor) as Artabano, Andrew Goodwin (tenor) as Artaserse, Russell Harcourt (countertenor) as Megabise, Emily Edmonds (mezzo-soprano) as Semira. release: 2020, Label: Pinchgut Opera, Cat. PG011.
