= Giasone =

1649 opera by Francesco Cavalli

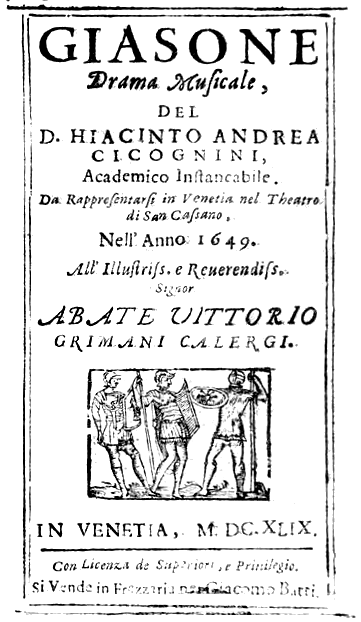
Title page of the original libretto

Giasone (Jason) is an opera in three acts and a prologue with music by Francesco Cavalli and a libretto by Giacinto Andrea Cicognini. It was premiered at the Teatro San Cassiano, Venice on 5 January 1649, during carnival. The plot is loosely based on the story of Jason and the Golden Fleece, but the opera contains many comic elements too.

Giasone was "the single most popular opera of the 17th century". It is rarely revived today, but has been performed by for example English Touring Opera (2013). Recordings include a 1988 version directed by René Jacobs with Michael Chance in the title role. A 2010 production by the Vlaamse Opera, with Christophe Dumaux in the title role, was released on DVD.

== Roles ==
Role	Voice type	Premiere Cast, 1649
Giasone (Jason), leader of the Argonauts	alto	
Ercole (Hercules), an Argonaut	bass	
Besso, captain of Giasone's guard	bass	
Isifile (Hypsipyle), Queen of Lemnos	soprano	
Oreste, confidant of Isifile	bass	
Alinda, Isifile's lady-in-waiting	soprano	
Medea, Queen of Colchis	soprano	
Delfa, Medea's old nurse	alto	
Rosmina, a gardener	soprano	
Egeo (Aegeus), King of Athens	tenor	Antonio Cesti
Demo, Egeo's servant, a stuttering hunchback	tenor	
Sole (The Sun, Apollo), protector of Medea	soprano	
Amore (Love, Cupid), protector of Isifile	soprano	
Giove (Jupiter)	bass	
Eolo (Aeolus)	alto	
Zeffiro (Zephyrus)	soprano	
Volano, spirit	tenor	
Chorus of Winds, Chorus of spirits, Argonauts, gods, soldiers, and sailors

== Synopsis ==
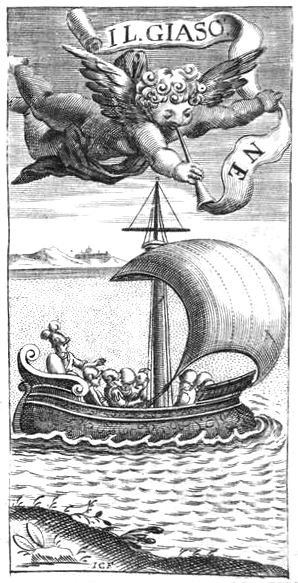
Frontispiece to the original libretto

=== Prologue ===
Two mythological characters appear in the prologue: Sole (the sun, i.e. Apollo) and Amore (love, i.e. Cupid). Sole opens with an aria about the gloriousness of the day because Giasone (i.e. Jason) will set out leading his Argonauts on a quest to find the Golden Fleece - or so it is expected. Sole is also elated that Giasone will marry his descendant Medea and so he lets forth his brightest light. In the following recitative, Amore chides Sole because no one has asked her for permission for this marriage. She had intended that Giasone marry Queen Isifile of the Island of Lemnos: the two are already married and have had twin children. After Amore's aria, they argue over this problem for the remainder of the prologue without resolution and they intend to fight one another.

=== Act 1 ===
A recitative begins with the Argonaut Ercole (i.e. Hercules), who complains that Giasone has not awoken yet, even though the sun is shining. He is perturbed because Giasone has grown soft as a result of enjoying the pleasures of love with an unknown woman (actually Queen Medea incognito who has been meeting him this way at night for a year) and as a result he has been neglecting his duties. Captain Besso enters and tries to convince Ercole that all men have their vices and so he should not be too concerned. Ercole, being a man of honor, tells Besso that is too effeminate, to which Besso replies: "Of woman I was born."

Giasone enters and sings the aria "Delizie, contenti" of his contentment in seeking sexual pleasure. Ercole admonishes him for neglecting to prepare for battle and the two discuss duty versus the pleasures of love.

Medea is alone singing a strophic aria "Se dardo pungente" about the pain of desiring love. She is joined by Egeo (i.e. King Aegeus of Athens) and together they discuss their marriage, which Medea would like to terminate. Egeo is unable to deal with this and he asks Medea to kill him with a dagger. She refuses and leaves. Alone, Egeo laments over his lost love with the recitative "Si parte, mi deride?".

Orestes introduces himself as Isifile's (Queen of Lemnos) spy in Colchis on a mission to get information about Giasone, but he is afraid of getting caught. Orestes meets the comic character Demo, who introduces himself to Orestes as a brave and handsome hunchback in the aria "Son gobbo, son Demo". After a lengthy conversation, Demo agrees to meet with Orestes and give him information about Giasone a later time.

Delfa (Medea's nurse) sings the aria "Voli il tempo" about how she has renounced love in her old age. She notices that Giasone is approaching and tells Medea that this is her chance to talk to him.

Giasone addresses Medea, who tells him she knows the identity of his night-time incognito lover and reproaches him for not living up to his duties as father of his twin children. She tells him to wait and she will return with the mother of his children.

Alone, Giasone contemplates his situation (i.e. not knowing which lover has his children) while he waits for Medea to return. Medea returns (with Delfa) and she tells him that she herself is the unknown lover and mother of his children. Giasone is filled with joy upon learning this. Giasone and Medea leave Delfa alone, who wishes the couple well, but questions the virtue of having illegitimate children.

In the countryside with huts near the mouth of the Ibero, Isifile is in a trance and singing the lament aria "Lassa, che far degg'io?" She desperately awaits Orestes return with information about Giasone, who she believes she has lost as a lover.

Later Medea is in her magic chamber performing witchcraft and singing the aria "Dell'antro magico" in order to invoke Pluto (King of the Underworld) and ask him to protect Giasone while he is away seeking the Golden Fleece. A Chorus of Spirits responds to her call and they agree to help Giasone by giving him a magical ring. Ellen Rosand remarks that this is the most famous scene in Giasone. A dance concludes the act.

=== Act 2 ===
Isifile is waiting for Orestes to return. She is in such grief that she lays down to rest. Alinda (a Lady) then sings a cheerful aria "Per provo so" on the subject of finding new love as a cure for pain.

Orestes arrives and Isifile scorns him for having been absent and tempts him to kiss her, then falls asleep. Orestes sings the love aria "Vaghi labbri scoloriti" and decides to kiss her. She awakens her and tells him she burns for him, but then asks about Giasone. Orestes reports that Giasone no longer loves her, but has another lover in Colchis. Furthermore, he tells her that Giasone is planning to quest for the Golden Fleece and that his ship might have a chance to talk with him when his ship passes by. Isifile sings the aria "Speranze fuggite" interspersed with recitative considering her situation.

At the keep of the fortress with the golden fleece, Medea, Jason and Delfa arrive. Trumpet music and stile concitato gestures suggest the martial atmosphere. The combat between Giasone and the monster ("a proud horned beast") takes place. The strings make drum-like martial gestures in an instrumental sinfonia that accompanies the action.

After the combat, Medea ensures Giasone is not injured. Ercole advises him to leave soon because the people are rising against him for taking the Golden Fleece.

Demo arrives to observe and notes that Giasone is returning to the ships. He sings the comic aria "Con arti e con lusinghe" in which he scorns women for using their wiles and swears that he will never be fooled by their trickery by falling in love. He then reports to Egeo (King of Athens) that Giasone and Medea have fled with the Golden Fleece. Egeo realizes that Medea has left him for Giasone and he is mad with jealousy. He and Demo chase after them.

The scene changes to the Cavern of Aeolus. Here the gods Jove (i.e. Jupiter) and Aeolus resolve to create a storm to shipwreck Giasone so that he will return to Isifile in Lemnos. A Chorus of Winds responds to their commands.

Returning to earth to a demolished harbor and a storm at sea, Orestes and Alinda discuss Isifile's jealousy that has driven her to madness. They sing a duet "Sai, ch'io t'amo" and confirm their love for each other.

Demo and Orestes have a long discussion with Demo complaining about the storm and worries for his life. He reports while Egeo was pursuing Giasone in his tiny skiff he fell into the water and drowned. Moreover, the storm is forcing the Argonauts to land at Lemnos. Orestes will inform Isifile.

Giasone, Medea and the Argonauts (including Besso and Ercole) come ashore at Lemnos. The scene opens with a love duet "Scendi, o bella" by Giasone and Medea. In the recitative that follows, Ercole praises Giasone for having lived up to his manly duties while Medea defends his passionate love for her.

Orestes arrives and tells Giasone that Isifile is looking for him. Gisaone and Medea agree to meet with her, although Medea admits jealousy. She wants to know who Isifile is. Giasone makes up a story that she is a hussy and that he does not love her, but Medea remains skeptical.

Giasone and Medea meet with Isifile. She approaches Giasone, but he reassures Medea that he is not interested in her. Giasone humors Isifile's pleas for him to return. Isifile says that Giasone has given her a child, but Giasone denies that he ever loved her. Isifile's emotion switches from bliss to anger in this mad scene.

Besso again defends Giasone for seeking love in the aria "D'affeto sincero." Alinda answers with the trumpet aria "Quanti soldati" in which she rejoices the arrival of all the soldiers available for maidens of Lemnos as a result of the storm. Besso and Alinda then flirt with each other. When Besso tells Alinda that he is a soldier, she does not believe him because he has no wounds or scars. In the end, they agree to stop fighting and together sing the love duet "Non piu guerra" in trumpet aria/concitato style.

=== Act 3 ===
Set in a flowery glade, Orestes and Delfa discuss Giasone's conflicting marriages to Medea and Isifile.

In a sleep scene, in which Medea and Giasone sing the duet "Dormi, dormi", they fall asleep in each other's arms after he tells her that he will dream of her beauty.

Besso finds Giasone and Medea sleeping with each other and feels some jealousy, for he too wants to find love. He sings the strophic aria "Non e pui bel piacer."

Isifile then arrives. She has been looking in vain for Giasone and has come to the glade to rest, but then she finds the two lovers sleeping. She awakens Giasone and they argue. Giasone is concerned that Medea will awaken and find him with Isifile. In fact, Medea has awoken but continues to feign sleeping so that she can overhear their conversation. Giasone promises to return the honor he has taken from Isifile. She does not believe him, but Giasone swears and gives her a kiss. Medea now rises and scorns Giasone for his disloyalty. To atone for this transgression, Giasone agrees to have Besso murder Isifile in an aside to Medea, who then leaves, pretending to allow Giasone to return to Isifile. Giasone then instructs Isifile to go in secret to meet Besso in the Valley of the Orseno and ask him if he has carried out his orders.

Giasone meets with Besso and tells him to go to the Valley of Orseno and wait for a messenger who will ask if he has carried out his orders. He instructs Besso to throw the messenger into the sea.

It is night in the countryside, and Egeo (dressed as a sailor) is with Demo (dressed as a peasant with a lantern). Egeo begins with the aria "Perch'io torni a penar" in which he complains about his miserable situation as a slave of unrequited love for Medea. Upon seeing Egeo, Demo, who had believed Egeo was dead, begs for mercy.

Isifile, alone in a moonlit night, is joyful because she believes Giasone has returned to her and she sings the strophic aria "Gioite, gioite." She then starts her journey to the Valley of Orseno.

Orestes asks Isifile to return and feed her hungry twins. She does so, but then hurries on to the Valley of Orseno.

In the Valley of Orseno, Medea sings the strophic aria "L'armi apprestatemi" expressing her rage against her rival with stile concitato gestures. She awaits the forthcoming murder of Isifile, but Besso has not arrived yet.

Delfa arrives and asks Medea why she is so jealous and angered. She advises her that it doesn't matter whether Giasone has been faithful or not. She sings the comic aria "E follia" suggesting that lovers are never loyal to each other.

Besso and his soldiers arrive and, as they approach, Medea plans to ask him what has happened and approaches him. Besso asks her if Giasone has sent her and she says that he has. Medea then asks if he has carried out his orders. With this, Besso has the soldiers arrest her and throw her into the sea.

Isifile then meets Besso and also asks him if he has carried out his orders. Besso tells her to report that he "only kills one queen per day" so he will not carry out his orders. Isifile finds the message cryptic.

Egeo hears Medea and throws himself into the sea with her.

Besso reports to Giasone that he has killed a queen but he does not specify a name. Giasone believes Besso means Isifile. Returning to Egeo and Medea in the sea, she refers to him as "my life" and mends the wounds between the two. Egeo plans to take revenge on Giasone for trying to kill Medea.

On an uninhabited place with ruins, Giasone speaks of his regret and grief because he believes he has killed Isifile at the request of the jealous Medea. He then faints. Egeo finds the unconscious Giasone and pulls out a dagger to kill him, but Isifile arrives and takes the dagger out of Egeo's hands.

When Besso's soldiers arrive Giasone orders him to arrest Egeo. Giasone realizes that Isifile is still alive and accuses Besso of disobeying his orders. Besso said that he had carried them out by killing Medea.

Medea shows up and, overhearing the conversation, calls Besso a liar. When he sees Medea alive, Giasone again thinks Besso is a traitor, but he proves otherwise: Medea confirms that Besso had arrested her and thrown her into the sea; and Isifile confirms that he told her that he "only kills one queen per day." Giasone notices the dagger and thinks Isifile has tried to kill him, but she said that she had wrested the dagger from a fugitive.

When Egeo arrives and says that it was he who tried to kill Giasone, Medea admits to having sent Egeo to do so in vengeance. Medea announces that she no longer loves Giasone, but prefers Egeo after all; moreover that Giasone should return to Isifile and scorns him for being unfaithful to her. Isifile laments and says goodbye, for she is dying but admits that she still loves Giasone even though he has killed her with his infidelity. Giasone asks for Isifile's forgiveness and tells Egeo and Medea to rejoice in their love. Isifile forgives him and they sing the love duet "Quanto son le mie gioie" to arrive at the standard Venetian happy ending. Right after, Alinda, Orestes, Delfa, and Demo providing their brief commentary on the joyful scene, followed by a brief duet (Medea and Isifile) and quartet (Isifile, Giasone, Medea and Egeo).

== Musicological Issues ==
Ellen Rosand remarks that by the mid-seventeenth-century Venetian public opera had developed a number of musical and dramatic conventions, several of which Giasone exhibits. For example: the three-act format, with the first act being the longest; dances conclude the first two acts; the Faustini lieto fine (happy ending) with concluding love duet; and an emotional climax with a lament. She notes that several aria and scene types had also been conventionalized by this point, and she notes that Giasone provides a model for several of them.

For example, Delfa’s short aria “È follia” is a part of a comic scene (III.12). The same could be said for Demo’s aria "Son gobbo, son Demo" (I.6).

Two trumpet arias with military connotations – based on Monteverdi’s stile concitato – are found in II.11: Alinda’s “Quanti Soldati” and Besso and Alinda’s “Non piu guerra”. The same scene has a conventional gratuitous reference to music which has not importance to the plot: Alinda and Besso’s “Ma quento piu” and a love duet: Alinda and Besso’s “Non piu guerra” (a mixed genre, it is also a trumpet aria).

Two sleep scenes are also included. Sleep scenes can serve important dramatic functions. For example, in act 3, 2-4 Medea and Giasone sing “Dormi, dormi” and then fall asleep in each other's arms. Isifile arrives and wakes Giasone and begin a conversation. Here, sleep allows characters to reveal or gain information. For example, Besso reveals his innermost thoughts in secret nearby the couple and by feigning continued sleep, Medea is able to secretly listen to the discussion to gain information. In the second sleep scene (act 3, 16-17), Giasone has fainted and becomes vulnerable to attack.

Medea’s “Dell'antro Magico” (act 1, 14) is an example of an invocation or ombra scene in which magic is used. Such scenes use a special kind of poetic meter called sdrucciolo, which places an accent on the antepenultimate syllable. Such scenes also feature a chorus as the Chorus of Spirits that follows Medea’s chant.

II.14 is mad scene (“Indietro rio canaglia”) in which Isifile has lost her sanity. Mad scenes can be traced to the character Licori in Giulio Strozzi's libretto La finta pazza Licori. Such scenes are characterized by a character's drastic emotional changes. Mad characters are "freed from the decorum of normal behavior." This particular scene is perhaps not the typical mad scene, for here Giasone portrays Isifile as insane to Medea in order to cover for his own actions. When Isifile appears, only Medea believes that she is mad. By the time the scene is over, Isifile does indeed become angry at Giasone and Medea.

Finally, there are three laments in the opera. Isifile also has two laments: "Lassa, che far degg'io?" (aria/recitative, I.13) and “Infelice ch’ascolto” (recitative, III.21). Isifile’s lament (act 3-21) is of the type based on the Monteverdi’s Arianna (1608) model, in which several sections express various emotions. Towards the end, the lamenter typically curses the lover who has abandoned her (or him), only to repent and beg forgiveness.

In addition to Isifile's laments, Egeo also laments that Medea has left him in I.4 with the recitative "Si parte, mi deride?" Susan McClary suggests that because the expression of emotion was more acceptable for seventeenth-century women than men, that lamentation was more acceptable for women than men. Moreover, a male character that laments has somehow been musically emasculated.

Giasone's mythological characters and plots are typical of early Venetian opera. Such subject matter could be used for political purpose by the creators of libretti, many of whom were members of Academia degli Incogniti (“Academy of the Unknown”), a group of libertine, skeptical, and often pessimistic thinkers in Venice at the time when Giasone was produced. Often, these plots were modifies to reinforce inequitable gender roles or question authorities, most notably the Catholic Church and especially the Incogniti’s ultimate rivals, the Jesuits.

The character Giasone was originally cast for a castrato. Susan McClary notes that, in this particular opera, this choice raises some gender issues. She argues that the singer type (e.g. bass, tenor, castrato, alto and soprano) each had certain associations. For example, a bass voice was generally used for an authoritarian or powerfully masculine figure. For example, a character such as Ercole who has as sense of responsibility and obligation to duty would be cast as a bass role. By contrast, Giasone is a youthful, attractive character more concerned with the sensual pleasures of love than any sort of duty, whether it be questing for the Golden Fleece or duties as husband and father. Such a character who shirks responsibility would be considered “effeminate” by seventeenth-century Venetian standards. Because castrati have a youthful appearance due to lack of secondary sexual characteristics, they could easily slip into such a role. Thus, they could play characters with erotic appeal and it would have been acceptable to the seventeenth-century Venetian audience for such characters to have irresponsible sexual relations during the course of the drama. McClary notes that Giasone sings the aria “Delizie contenti” upon entering in II.2, thus declaring he is a character of this “effeminate” type: youthful, attractive, androgynous, pleasure-seeking, and lacking a sense of duty. She stresses that such a character would not have been considered a good role model for masculine behavior at the time and place of the opera’s first performance.

== Recordings ==
=== Audio ===
- 1988: Giasone: René Jacobs (conductor), Concerto Vocale (instrumental ensemble). Soloists: Michael Chance (Giasone), Gloria Banditelli (Medea), Catherine Dubosc (Isifile), Guy de Mey (Egeo), Bernard Deletré (Oreste), Dominique Visse (Delfa). Nearly complete working edition by Jacobs based on manuscripts in the Biblioteca Marciana, Venice, the Österreichische Nationalbibliothek, Vienna, and Christ Church Library, Oxford; includes music by other composers; also used for Jacobs' production at the Tiroler Landestheater Innsbruck during the Festwoche der Alten Musik (see 1988 video below). Recorded May 1988. Label: Harmonia Mundi, 3 CDs (2000) 3h 55m.
- 2011: Il novello Giasone: Antonio Greco (conductor), OIDI Festival Baroque Ensemble, Festival della Valle d'Itria. Soloists: Borja Quiza (Giasone, baritone), Aurora Tirotta (Medea), Roberta Mameli (Isifile), Mirko Guadagnini (Egeo), Luigi De Donato (Besso), Paolo Lopez (Delfa), Luca Tittoto (Oreste), Gaia Petrone (Alinda, contralto), Masashi Mori (Ercole), Krystian Adam (Demo), Pavol Kuban (Volano), Maria Luisa Casali (Sole). Version of Giasone performed under the title Il novello Giasone in Rome in 1671, with musical additions and changes by Alessandro Stradella and libretto revised by Giovanni Filippo Apolloni; modern edition curated by Nicola Usula and Marco Beghelli in consultation with Lorenzo Bianconi. Recorded live, July 2011, Teatro Verdi, Martina Franca; Label: Bongiovanni, 3 CDs (2014) 2h 48m.
- 2013: Giasone: Erin Helyard (conductor), Orchestra of the Antipodes, Pinchgut Opera. Soloists: David Hansen (Giasone), Celeste Lazarenko (Medea), Miriam Allan (Isifile), Christopher Saunders (Demo), David Greco (Oreste), Andrew Goodwin (Egeo), Adrian McEniery (Delfa), Nicholas Dinopoulos (Ercole), Alexandra Oomens (Alinda). Abridged edition of the score by Helyard. Recorded live, December 2013, City Recital Hall Angel Place; Chas Rader-Shieber (stage director). Label: Pinchgut LIVE, 2 CDs (2014) 2h 31m.

=== Video ===
- 1988: Giasone: René Jacobs (conductor), Instrumental ensemble of the Innsbruck Festival of Early Music. Soloists: Michael Chance (Giasone), Gloria Banditelli (Medea), Catherine Dubosc (Isifile), Guy de Mey (Egeo), Bernard Deletré (Oreste), Dominique Visse (Delfa). This staged performance includes cuts to the edition Jacobs used for his 1988 audio recording (see above). Recorded May 1988, Tiroler Landestheater Innsbruck; Christian Gagneron (set designer). Label: House of Opera, Duluth, GA, DVD (2005) about 3h; Encore, DVD (200?) 3h.
- 2010: Il Giasone: Federico Maria Sardelli (conductor), Flemish Opera. Soloists: Christophe Dumaux (Giasone), Katarina Bradič (Medea), Robin Johannsen (Isifile), Josef Wagner (Giove/Besso), Filippo Adami (Demo), Yaniv d'Or (Delfa/Eolo), Angélique Noldus (Amore/Alinda), Andrew Ashwin (Ercole/Oreste), Emilio Pons (Egeo/Sole). Revised edition of the score by Alexander Krampe. Recorded live, May 2010, Vlaamse Opera Antwerp; Mariame Clément (stage director). Label: Dynamic, 2 DVDs (2012) 3h 18m.
- 2017: Il Giasone: Leonardo García Alarcón (conductor), Capella Mediterranea (instrumental ensemble). Soloists: Valer Sabadus (Giasone), Kristina Hammarström (Medea), Kristina Mkhitaryan (Isifile/Sole), Willard White (Giove/Oreste). Recorded live, February 2017, L'Opéra des nations du Grand Théâtre de Genève; Serena Sinigaglia (stage director). Label: Alpha Classics/Outhere Music, DVD (2018) 3h 2m.
