= Teddy Tahu Rhodes =

New Zealand-born baritone opera singer (born 1966)

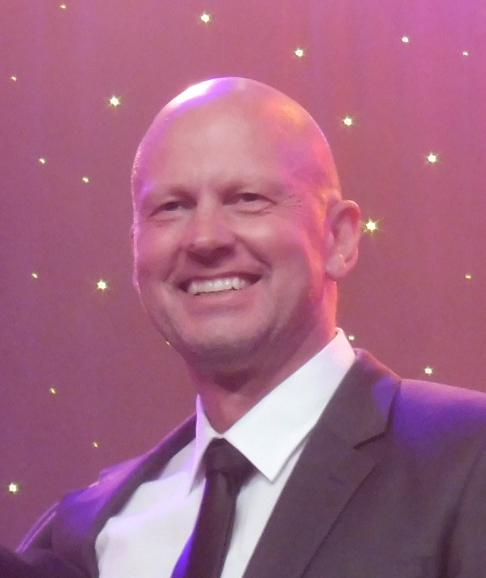
Teddy Tahu Rhodes, 2018

Teddy Tahu Rhodes (born 30 August 1966) is a New Zealand-born operatic baritone based in Australia. He has performed at opera houses in New Zealand, Australia, San Francisco, Houston, Dallas, Philadelphia, Washington, New York City and throughout Europe. Apart from many appearances in the standard repertoire, he has sung leading roles in Australian and world premieres. His recordings range from Baroque oratorios, operas, Lieder cycles to nursery rhymes and musical theatre. His album The Voice won the Fine Arts Award at the 2004 ARIA Music Awards.

== Early life ==
Rhodes was born in Christchurch, New Zealand, on 30 August 1966, to a British mother, Joyce, and a New Zealand father, Terrence Tahu Gravenor Rhodes. The Maori word "Tahu", which means "to set on fire", was added to the family name soon after they settled in New Zealand. His parents divorced when he was an infant, and he grew up with his mother. His aunt Margaret Rhodes, the wife of his paternal uncle Denys Rhodes, was a first cousin of Queen Elizabeth II. Crime novelist Ngaio Marsh was a friend of the family and lived on and off with Rhodes' grandparents (Arthur) Tahu Rhodes and Helen "Nelly" Rhodes (née Plunket) in Britain in the 1920s and 30s; in a 2011 documentary, Rhodes recalled "the magnificent Christmases that Marsh put on for her friends' children".

In his final year of secondary school, Christ's College, Christchurch, Rhodes was selected for the New Zealand Youth Choir, where his musical potential was first identified. Following a relatively short period of formal lessons, he was entered into the 1986 Dame Sister Mary Leo Scholarship competition, which he won. He pursued private studies while studying at the University of Canterbury in Christchurch, from which he graduated with a Bachelor of Commerce degree, subsequently qualifying as an accountant. His teachers, at this time and later, included Mary Adams Taylor, Rudolf Piernay and David Harper.

In 1991 Rhodes won the Mobil Song Quest, the major competition of its type in New Zealand, securing funding to study at the Guildhall School of Music and Drama in London. He turned down an offer by the Guildhall of a scholarship for two years of further study, returning to New Zealand where he worked as an accountant for some years.

== Career ==
While working as an accountant in Christchurch, Rhodes maintained an association with Canterbury Opera, the local repertory opera company. In 1998 he made his international debut as Dandini in La Cenerentola for Opera Australia. Following his Australian debut, in 1999 Rhodes represented New Zealand in the BBC Cardiff Singer of the World competition.

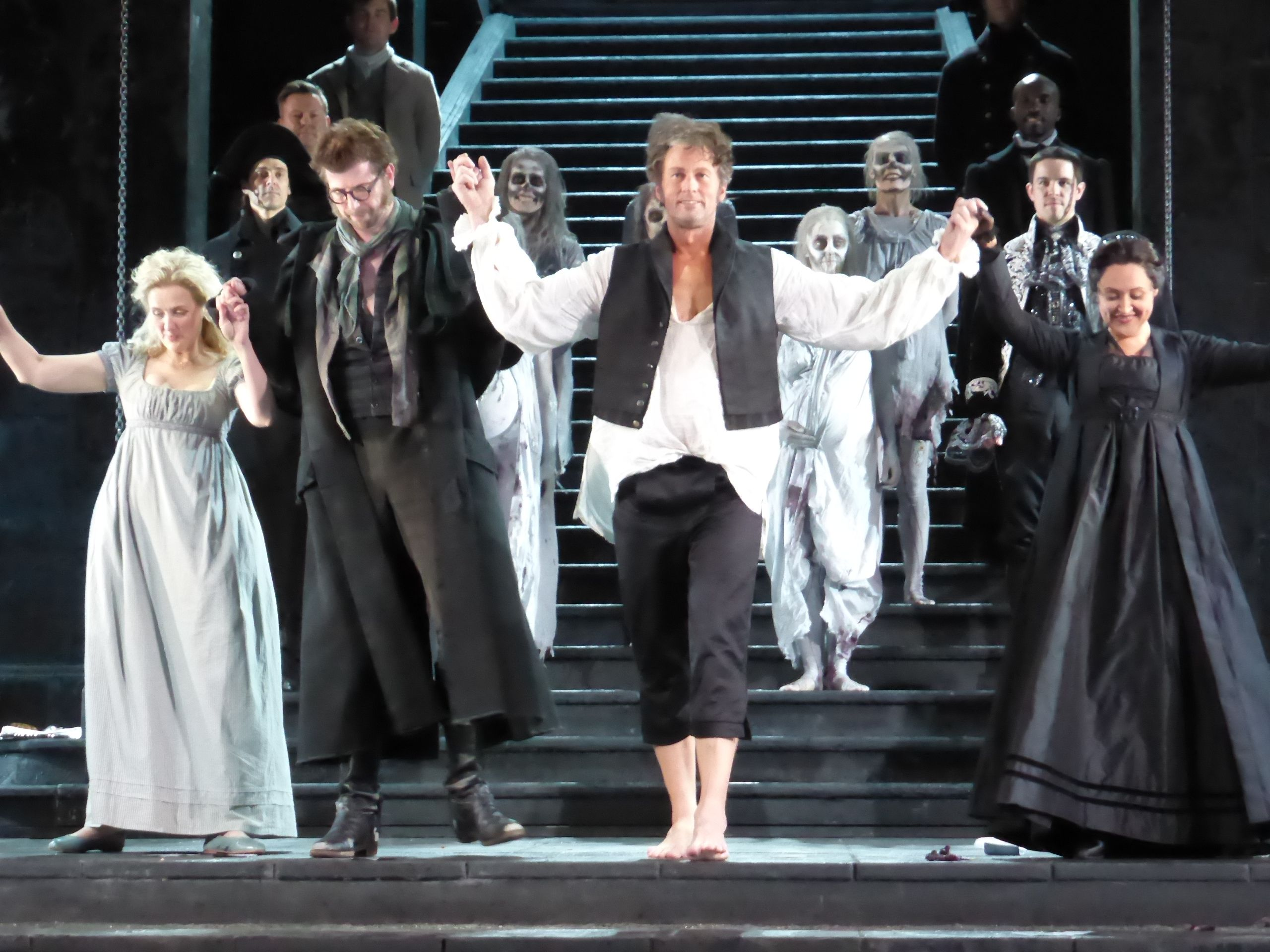
Taryn Fiebig (Zerlina), Shane Lowrencev (Leporello), Teddy Tahu Rhodes (Don Giovanni), Elvira Fatykhova (Donna Anna), in Don Giovanni, Sydney Opera House, Opera Australia, 2014

He has sung in several world and Australian premiere performances such as The End of the Affair (Bendrix) and Dead Man Walking (Joe) by Jake Heggie, The Little Prince by Rachel Portman (The Pilot) as well as in Nigel Butterley's Spell of Creation and Barry Conyngham's Fix. His wide variety of other opera roles have included Mozart's Count Almaviva, Guglielmo, Papageno and Don Giovanni; Demetrius in A Midsummer Night's Dream; Belcore in L'elisir d'amore; Billy in Billy Budd; Lescaut in Manon Lescaut; Stanley in A Streetcar Named Desire; Escamillo in Carmen; Al Kasim in Hans Werner Henze's L'upupa; Silvio in Pagliacci, Harlequin in Ariadne auf Naxos, Leandro in The Love for Three Oranges and Antony in Barber's Antony and Cleopatra. In 2012/13, he performed opposite Lisa McCune in Opera Australia's production of the Bartlett Sher 2008 New York revival of the Rodgers and Hammerstein musical South Pacific at the Sydney Opera House, the Princess Theatre, Melbourne, and the Brisbane Queensland Performing Arts Centre. He joined McCune again in Opera Australia's production of The King and I in 2014 in Sydney and Brisbane.

Amongst the prominent opera companies and theatres in which he has performed are the Metropolitan Opera, Opera Australia, San Francisco Opera, Austin Lyric Opera, Washington National Opera, Opera Philadelphia, Dallas Opera, Cincinnati Opera, Houston Grand Opera, Hamburg State Opera, Bavarian State Opera, Welsh National Opera, Scottish Opera, the Théâtre du Châtelet, the Santa Fe Opera, the New York City Opera and the Theater an der Wien.

Rhodes substituted at three hours' notice in January 2010 for an indisposed Mariusz Kwiecień in the role of Escamillo in the Metropolitan Opera Live in HD telecast of Carmen, a role he was to take over from Kwiecień later in the season.

In oratorio and choral works, he has appeared as the baritone soloist in performances of Handel's Messiah with the Melbourne Symphony and the Sydney Philharmonia Choirs, and in Fauré's Requiem with the London Philharmonic. In 2025, Rhodes sang the role of Vox Christi in Felix Mendelssohn's version of Bach's St Matthew Passion at the Sydney Opera House, broadcast on ABC Classic.

The inaugural Australian cruise of the performing arts on the MS Radiance of the Seas in November 2014 included Rhodes as well as, among others, Cheryl Barker, David Hobson, Simon Tedeschi, Elaine Paige, and Marina Prior.

In March 2024, Rhodes was appointed to the Elder Conservatory in Adelaide in a leading role as teacher and mentor. In 2025 he sang the role of Sarastro in a production of The Magic Flute for State Opera of South Australia at Her Majesty's Theatre, Adelaide.

== Personal life ==
Rhodes first married in 1989, a union that was dissolved amicably in 1996. He married mezzo-soprano Isabel Leonard in December 2008. In September 2013, this marriage was reported to have ended.

== Discography ==
- 2001: Fauré: Requiem, Cantique de Jean Racine, La naissance de Vénus; Sinfonia Australis, Cantillation, Antony Walker; with Sara Macliver; ABC Classics
- 2003: Mozart Arias and Orchestral Music (with Tasmanian Symphony Orchestra and Ola Rudner) ABC Classics – nominated for Best Classical Album at the ARIA Music Awards of 2003
- 2003: Messiah Highlights, Orchestra of the Antipodes, Cantillation, Antony Walker; ABC Classics
- 2004: The Voice, ABC Classics – won Best Classical Album at the ARIA Music Awards of 2004
- 2004: Musical Renegades ("Paavali's Song" from Kuolema (Sibelius), "The Mountain Thrall" (Grieg) Australian Chamber Orchestra, Richard Tognetti; ABC Classics (2 CDs, DVD)
- 2004: The Little Prince by Rachel Portman (world premiere); as The Pilot; Sony Music (2CDs, DVD)
- 2004: Live from New Zealand, two duets with Hayley Westenra; Decca (DVD)
- 2005: Vagabond, songs and song cycles by Ralph Vaughan Williams, Benjamin Britten, Roger Quilter, John Ireland and Gerald Finzi; Sharolyn Kimmorley (piano); ABC Classics
- 2008: Peter Grimes (Britten), Metropolitan Opera Live in HD, as Ned Keene (Rhodes' Metropolitan Opera debut)
- 2009: You'll Never Walk Alone, Sinfonia Australis, Guy Noble; with David Hobson, following their national tour; ABC Classics – nominated for Best Classical Album at the ARIA Music Awards of 2009
- 2010: The Bach Arias, Orchestra of the Antipodes, Antony Walker, Brett Weymark; with Sara Macliver; ABC Classics – nominated for Best Classical Album at the ARIA Music Awards of 2010
- 2011: The Marriage of Figaro (Mozart) as Figaro; Sydney Opera House, directed by Neil Armfield, conducted by Patrick Summers; with Taryn Fiebig, Peter Coleman-Wright, Rachelle Durkin, Warwick Fyfe, Jacqueline Dark, Kanen Breen; Blu-ray Opera Australia
- 2011: Best of Teddy Tahu Rhodes, ABC Classics
- 2011: Serious Songs (Brahms, Schubert, Barber) Tasmanian Symphony Orchestra, Sebastian Lang-Lessing; Kristian Chong (piano); Deutsche Grammophon – nominated for Best Classical Album at the ARIA Music Awards of 2011
- 2012: A German Requiem (Brahms), Melbourne Symphony Orchestra, Johannes Fritzsch; with Nicole Car; ABC Classics
- 2014: Mahler (Rückert-Lieder, Des Knaben Wunderhorn, Kindertotenlieder) Tasmanian Symphony Orchestra, Marko Letonja; Sharolyn Kimmorley (piano); ABC Classics
- 2015: From Broadway to La Scala, Sinfonia Australis, Tasmanian Symphony Orchestra, Guy Noble; English Chamber Orchestra, Richard Bonynge; with Greta Bradman, David Hobson, Lisa McCune; ABC Classics
- 2015: There Was a Man Lived in the Moon, nursery rhymes and children's songs, arranged by Andrew Ford, with Jane Sheldon (soprano); ABC Classics
- 2018: I'll Walk Beside You, Southern Cross Soloists, Karin Schaupp (guitar)

== Awards ==
Rhodes won the 2004 Mo Award as Classical/Opera Performer of the Year.

In 2006 he was the winner of the Limelight Award for Best Performance by a Soloist with an Orchestra for his Australian tour with the Australian Chamber Orchestra.

In 2004 and again in 2008, he won a Helpmann Award for Best Male Performer in an Opera for his role in Dead Man Walking.

In 2008 he received a Laureate Award from the Arts Foundation of New Zealand.
