= Giustino (Legrenzi) =

1683 opera by Giovanni Legrenzi

Il Giustino
- Opera by Giovanni Legrenzi
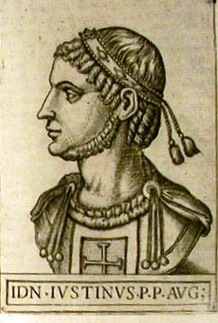
- Late 16th-century depiction of Emperor Justin I, the opera's protagonist
- Librettist: Nicolò Beregan
- Premiere: 12 February 1683; Teatro San Salvador, Venice

Il Giustino is an opera in three acts by composer Giovanni Legrenzi. The work uses an Italian-language libretto by Nicolò Beregan based on the life of Emperor Justin I. The opera premiered on 12 February 1683 at the Teatro San Salvador in Venice; Selfridge-Field gives 7 February as the date. Legrenzi dedicated the work to Alexander Farnese, Duke of Parma.

== Background and performance history ==
Considered one of Legrenzi's finest compositions, the work includes more than 70 arias. The opera tells the story of Giustino's rise from the position of a simple poor farmer to being crowned the Byzantine emperor. For several decades following its 1683 premiere at the Teatro San Salvador, Il Giustino was one of the most widely performed Venetian operas. According to musicologist Reinhard Strohm, its music was still being discussed as late as 1720 in Benedetto Marcello's pamphlet Il teatro alla moda.

On 26 April 2007, Il Giustino had its first modern revival at the Schwetzingen Festival in a production directed by Nicolas Brieger with set designer Katrin Nettrod and costume designer Jorge Jara. Musicologist and conductor Thomas Hengelbrock prepared the performance score for the production, and also led the Balthasar-Neumann-Ensemble in performances of the work. Soprano Elisabeth Kulman led the cast in the title role of Giustino, with Georg Nigl as Ariannas, Cornelia Ptassek as Arianna, Terry Wey as Andronico/Flavia, Delphine Galou as Eufemia, Peter Kennel as Vitaliano, and Hermann Oswald as Amantio.

In May 2023, Giustino had its Australian premiere at City Recital Hall, Sydney, in a production by Pinchgut Opera with the Orchestra of the Antipodes conducted by Erin Helyard. It was broadcast on ABC Television on 16 July 2023.

== Roles ==
Roles, voice types
Role	Voice type
Emperor Anastasio	soprano
Empress Arianna	soprano
Giustino	soprano
Eufemia	soprano
Vitaliano	contralto
Andronico	soprano
Amanzio	tenor
Polimante	bass
Erasto capitano	bass
Brillo	bass
Ombra di Vitaliano	bass
Atlante	bass
Venere	soprano
Imeneo	mezzo-soprano
Fortuna	soprano
Allegrezza	soprano
Gloria	soprano
Eternità	contralto
