= Sinfonia Australis =

Sinfonia Australis is an Australian early music ensemble founded by Antony Walker and Alison Johnston. They play on period instruments. They were founded alongside vocal ensemble Cantillation and the Orchestra of the Antipodes. Along with Gerard Willems received a nomination for the 2004 ARIA Award for Best Classical Album with their album Beethoven Complete Piano Concertos.

Sinfonia Australis often performs with the Pinchgut Opera and appear on many ABC Classics albums. Albums they appear on include David Hobson's Handel Arias and Shu-Cheen Yu's Lotus Moon, both ARIA nominees.

== Discography ==
- Shu-Cheen Yu, Sinfonia Australis, Antony Walker
  - Lotus Moon (2001) – ABC Classics
  - Willow Spirit Song: Folksongs of the Orient (2002) – ABC Classics
- Cantillation, Sara Macliver, Teddy Tahu Rhodes, Sinfonia Australis, Antony Walker
  - Fauré: Requiem (2001) – ABC Classics
- David Hobson, Sinfonia Australis, Cantillation, Antony Walker
  - Handel Arias (2002) – ABC Classics
- Jane Sheldon, Cantillation, Sinfonia Australis
  - Song of the Angel (2003) – ABC Classics
- Gerard Willems, Sinfonia Australis, Antony Walker
  - Beethoven Complete Piano Concertos (2003) – ABC Classics
- David Hobson, Sinfonia Australis, Guy Noble
  - Cinema Paradiso (2004) – ABC Classics
