= Cantillation (ensemble) =

Australian vocal ensemble

Cantillation is an Australian vocal ensemble founded in 2001 by Antony Walker and Alison Johnston. They were founded alongside orchestras Sinfonia Australis and Orchestra of the Antipodes.

Cantillation often performs with the Pinchgut Opera and appear on many ABC Classics albums. Albums they appear on include Teddy Tahu Rhodes' The Voice (ARIA winner) and David Hobson's Handel Arias (ARIA nominee).

== Discography ==
=== Charting albums ===
List of charting albums, with Australian chart positions
Title	Album details	Peak chart positions
Title	Album details	AUS
Prayer for Peace (with Anthony Walker)	Released: October 2002; Format: CD; Label: Universal (465 824-2)	65
Sacred Music	Released: August 2003; Format: CD; Label: Universal (472 881-2 )	73

=== Albums ===
- Cantillation
  - Silent Night (2004) – ABC Classics
  - Serenity (2008) – ABC Classics
  - Bohemian Rhapsody: Choral Pop (2015) – ABC Classics
- Cantillation, Antony Walker
  - Prayer for Peace (2002) – ABC Classics
  - Allegri Miserere (2003) – ABC Classics
  - Ye Banks & Braes (2006) – ABC Classics
  - Hallelujah! (2007) – ABC Classics
- Cantillation, Sara Macliver, Teddy Tahu Rhodes, Sinfonia Australis, Antony Walker
  - Fauré: Requiem (2001) – ABC Classics
- Cantillation, Sara Macliver, Jonathan Summers, Paul McMahon, Australian Virtuosi, Synergy Percussion, Sydney Children's Choir, Antony Walker
  - Carmina Burana (2002) – ABC Classics
- David Hobson, Sinfonia Australis, Cantillation, Antony Walker
  - Handel Arias (2002) – ABC Classics
- Sara Macliver, Alexandra Sherman, Christopher Field, Paul McMahon, Teddy Tahu Rhodes, Cantillation, Orchestra of the Antipodes, Antony Walker
  - Handel: Messiah (2002) – ABC Classics
  - Handel: Messiah Highlights (2003) – ABC Classics
- Jane Sheldon, Cantillation, Sinfonia Australis
  - Song of the Angel (2003) – ABC Classics
- Teddy Tahu Rhodes, Sinfonia Australia, Orchestra of the Antipodes, Cantillation, Antony Walker
  - The Voice (2004) – ABC Classics
- Emma Kirkby, Cantillation, Orchestra of the Antipodes, Antony Walker
  - Magnificat (2006) – ABC Classics
- Pinchgut Opera
  - Semele (2003) – ABC Classics
  - Purcell: The Fairy-Queen (2004) – ABC Classics
  - Monteverdi: L'Orfeo (2005) – ABC Classics
  - Rameau: Dardanus (2006) – ABC Classics
  - Charpentier: David and Jonathan (2009) – ABC Classics
  - Iphigénie en Tauride (2015) – ABC Classics
