= Taryn Fiebig =

Australian opera soprano (1972–2021)

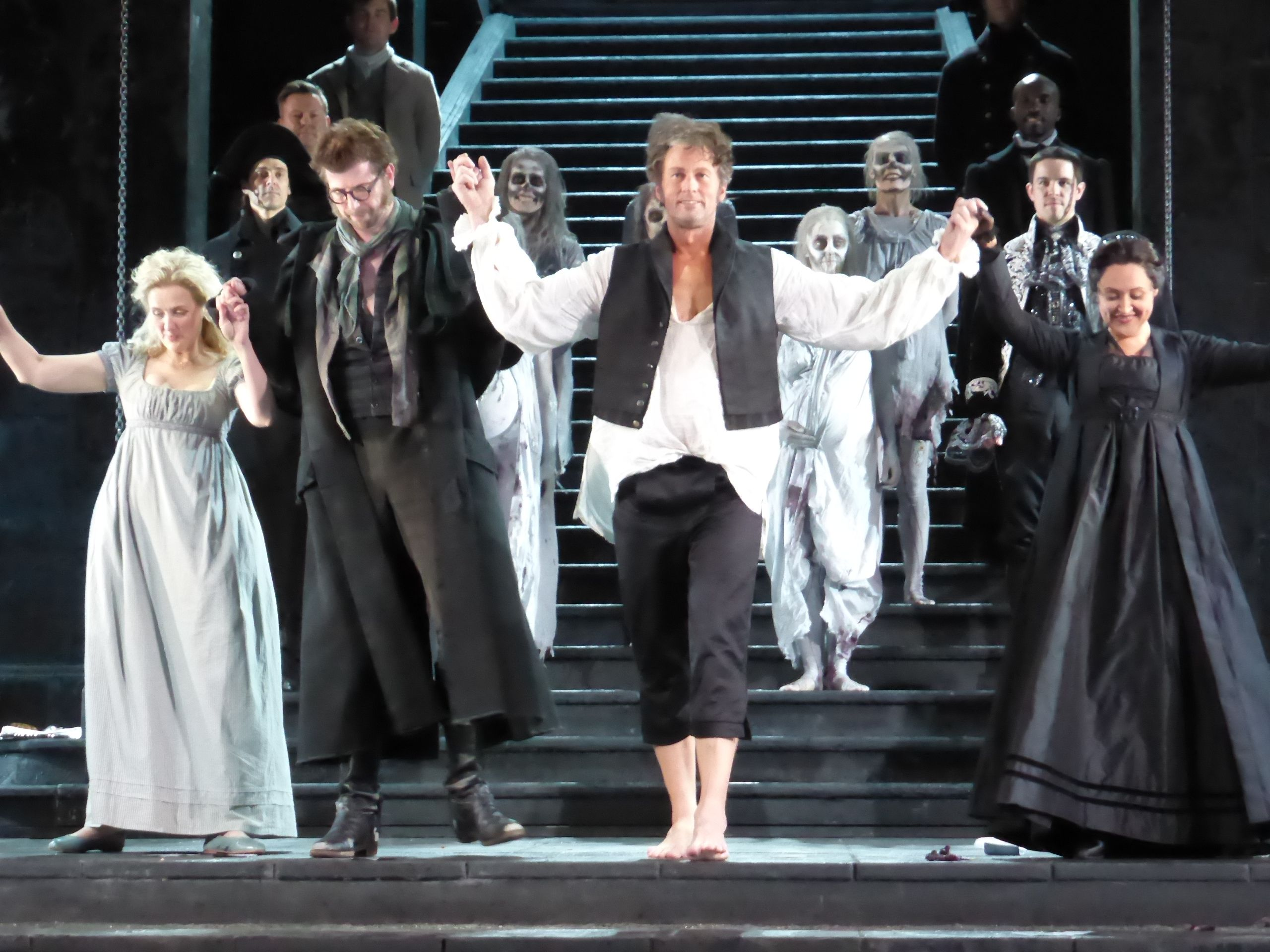
- Applause after Mozart's Don Giovanni at the Sydney Opera House in 2014, from left: Taryn Fiebig (Zerlina), Shane Lowrencev (Leporello), Teddy Tahu Rhodes (Don Giovanni) and Elvira Fatykhova (Donna Anna)
- Born: 1 February 1972; Perth, Australia
- Died: 20 March 2021 (aged 49); Sydney, Australia
- Education: University of Western Australia
- Occupation: Operatic soprano
- Organizations: Opera Australia
- Awards: Helpmann Awards

Taryn Fiebig (1 February 1972 – 20 March 2021) was an Australian soprano, a principal soprano of Opera Australia who also performed internationally. She appeared in many Mozart roles such as Susanna and Zerlina. The versatile singer also performed in Baroque opera, Italian repertoire, contemporary opera, operetta and musical theatre.

== Early life ==
Born in Perth, Fiebig was a music student at Churchlands Senior High School from 1985 – 1989. She initially graduated as a cellist from the School of Music at the University of Western Australia, before commencing vocal training, occasionally marrying the two on stage, with her cello accompanying her own singing.

== Career ==
She joined Opera Australia in 2005 as a principal soprano. Her roles for that company include Mozart's Servilia in La clemenza di Tito, Susanna in The Marriage of Figaro (televised and recorded), Zerlina in Don Giovanni, both Papagena and Pamina in The Magic Flute. She appeared in Baroque opera such as Belinda in Purcell's Dido and Aeneas and Galatea in Handel's Acis and Galatea, and in Italian opera including Lisa in Bellini's La sonnambula, Clorinda in Rossini's La Cenerentola, and Musetta in Puccini's La bohème. She performed the roles of The Plaintiff in Trial by Jury, Rose in Lakmé by Delibes, Karolka in Janáček's Jenůfa, and Aphrodite in Richard Mills' The Love of the Nightingale. In musical theatre and operetta, she appeared as Gianetta in The Gondoliers, as The Plaintiff in Trial by Jury, and Adele in Die Fledermaus by Johann Strauss.

In 2006/07, she was Mabel in The Pirates of Penzance, alongside Anthony Warlow as the Pirate King and David Hobson as Frederic. In 2008 and 2009, she performed as Eliza Doolittle in a national tour of My Fair Lady opposite UK actor Richard E. Grant. Fiebig sang the role of Sicle in Pinchgut Opera's 2009 production of Francesco Cavalli's 1644 opera Ormindo. In 2010, Fiebig was nominated for the Helpmann Awards' Best Female Performer in a Supporting Role in an Opera for Brett Dean's Bliss and La sonnambula; she won the award for her creation of the role of Lucy in Bliss.

In 2011, she sang Yum-Yum in Opera Australia's production of The Mikado which was televised on ABC Television. In 2012, Fiebig added the role of Pamina in Julie Taymor's English-language production of The Magic Flute to her repertoire. In 2013, she sang Oscar in Verdi's Un ballo in maschera directed by La Fura dels Baus.

More roles include Nannetta in Verdi's Falstaff (2014), Despina in Mozart's Così fan tutte (2016), Gutrune in Wagner's Götterdämmerung (2016) and Mother in Metamorphosis by the Australian composer Brian Howard (2018). For latter role she won her second Helpmann Award in 2019 for Best Female Performer in a Supporting Role in an Opera. In 2019, for Pinchgut Opera, she performed as Selinda in Vivaldi's Farnace.

== Personal life ==
Fiebig's first husband was Australian composer and music director Iain Grandage. In 2015, she married New Zealand-born baritone Jud Arthur. Actress Melissa George is her cousin.

Fiebig died from ovarian cancer in Sydney on 20 March 2021, aged 49.

== Recognition ==
The Taryn Fiebig Prize was established in 2022; the prize of $10,000 is awarded to a deserving student of the Western Australian Academy of Performing Arts (WAAPA) to further their professional development.

Pinchgut Opera founded the Taryn Fiebig Scholar program in her memory, to be awarded annually to a solo vocalist performing 17th or 18th century music.

The Taryn Fiebig Concert Hall at Churchlands Senior High School was named for her in 2022.

== Discography ==
- 2002: Thyme & Roses (16 folk songs), with Jayne Hockley (harp), MBT Publishing
- 2007: Old American Songs (Foster, Copland, Weill, Rorem, Grainger), with Juan Jackson (tenor), Andrew Greene (piano), ABC Classics 4766169
- 2007: French Baroque Cantatas (Montéclair, Stuck), with Fiona Campbell (mezzo-soprano), Ensemble Battistin, ABC Classics 4765941
- 2020: On Eternal Love (Hahn, Schubert, Schumann, Brahms, Poulenc, R. Strauss), with Scott Davie (piano), ABC Classics 0028948556151
- 2022: SHE – Survival, Hope, Empowerment ("She" (Aznavour), arias, Lieder), Fiebig also accompanying herself on cello; with Guy Noble (piano, conductor), SSB Orchestra; string quintet; choir, including Cheryl Barker, Peter Coleman-Wright, John Longmuir, Jud Arthur
