= Elisabeth Kulman =

Austrian classical singer (born 1973)

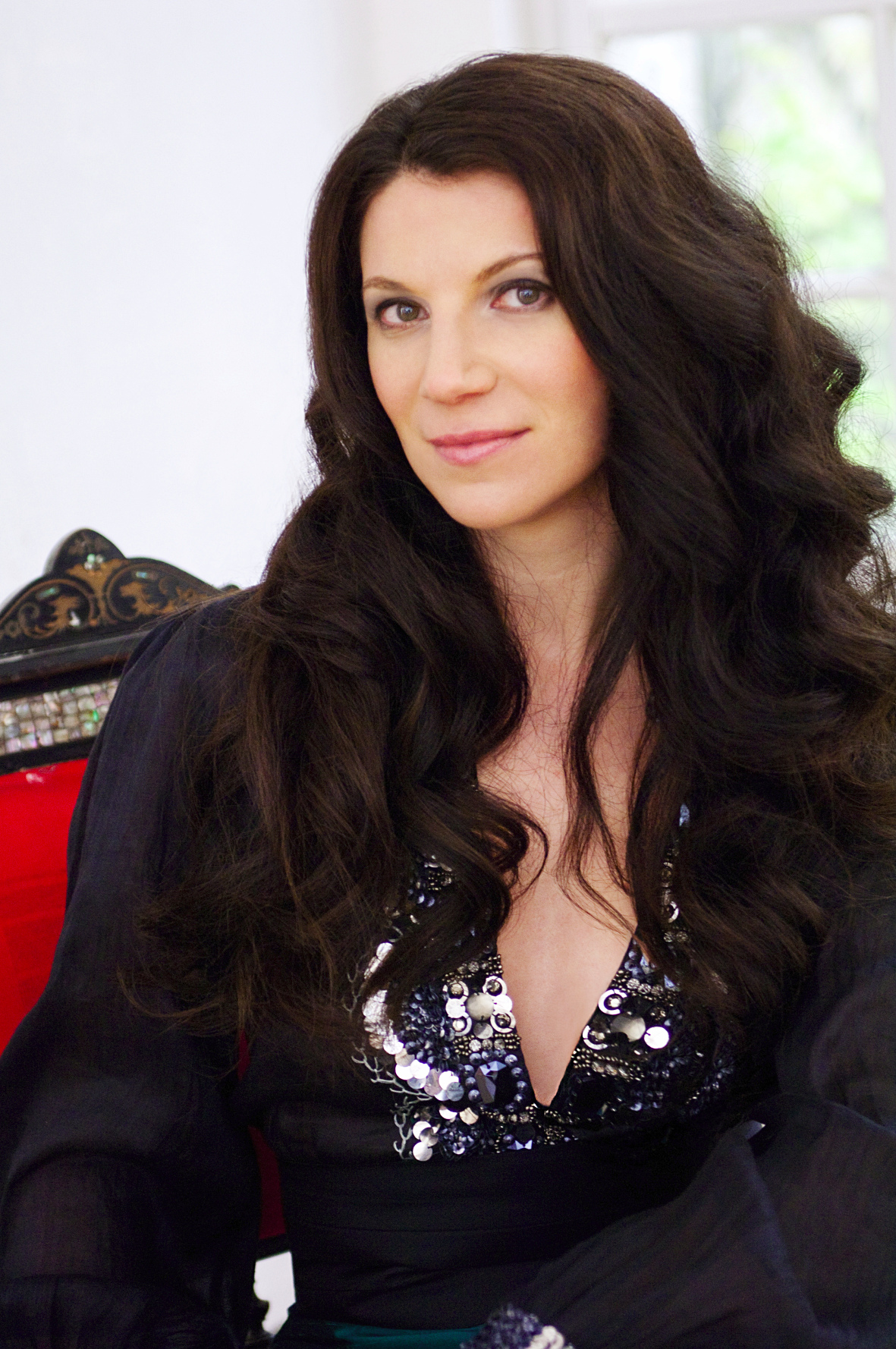
- Kulman in 2010
- Born: June 28, 1973 (age 53); Oberpullendorf
- Education: Universität für Musik und darstellende Kunst Wien
- Occupations: Classical singer (soprano, mezzo-soprano and contralto)
- Organizations: Wiener Volksoper; Vienna State Opera
- Awards: Eberhard-Waechter-Medaille

Elisabeth Kulman (born 28 June 1973) is an Austrian classical singer who has performed operatic roles in soprano, mezzo-soprano and contralto repertory. She has appeared at opera houses in Vienna and internationally. She has performed early operas such as Legrenzi's Il Giustino as well as new works, creating the role of Gora in the premiere of Reimann's Medea at the Vienna State Opera. She recorded Lieder by Mussorgsky, Bach's Christmas Oratorio with Peter Schreier and Beethoven's Missa solemnis with Nikolaus Harnoncourt. From 2015, she has focused on concert singing.

== Career ==
Born in Oberpullendorf, Kulman achieved the Matura in 1991. She studied Russian, Finno-Ugristics and musicology. She was a choir singer in several notable choirs in Vienna, including Arnold Schoenberg Chor, Concentus Vocalis Wien, Wiener Singakademie, Wiener Kammerchor and Chorus sine nomine. She began voice studies in 1995 at the Universität für Musik und darstellende Kunst Wien with Helena Lazarska. She completed her studies in both Oper and Lied und Oratorium as a master of arts mit Auszeichnung. She was immediately engaged to appear as Pamina in Mozart's Die Zauberflöte at the Wiener Volksoper in 2001, followed by other Mozart roles such as the Countess in Le nozze di Figaro and Donna Elvira in Don Giovanni.

In 2004, Kulman changed to mezzo-soprano, with the title role of Suppé's Boccaccio, staged by Helmuth Lohner. She appeared as Orpheus in Gluck's Orphée et Eurydice at the Opéra National de Paris in June 2005. In the New Year's Eve 2006 production of Die Fledermaus, she was Prince Orlofsky, a performance that garnered her the Eberhard-Waechter-Medaille. She sang the title role of Bizet's Carmen at the Staatsoper Berlin in 2007. In 2010, she appeared as Gora in the premiere of Aribert Reimann's Medea at the Vienna State Opera. In 2011 she appeared in Berlin again as Smeton in Donizetti's Anna Bolena, alongside Anna Netrebko in the title role and Elīna Garanča as Giovanna Seymour.

In the field of historically informed performance, she appeared in two opera revivals at the Schwetzingen Festival, both conducted by Thomas Hengelbrock, in 2005 in Alessandro Scarlatti's Telemaco, and in 2007 in the title role of Giovanni Legrenzi's Il Giustino.

As a Lied singer, often with Walter Moore as the pianist, she has focused on unusual repertory such as Mussorgsky Dis-Covered, a project of Tscho Theissing, and Mahler arrangements with the ensemble Amarcord Wien. She recorded Bach's Christmas Oratorio on DVD, conducted by Peter Schreier who also performed the part of the Evangelist, with the Münchener Bach-Chor, the Bach Collegium München, Sibylla Rubens, Martin Petzold and Andreas Scheibner. In 2013, she recorded Beethoven's Missa solemnis, conducted by Nikolaus Harnoncourt, with the Netherlands Radio Choir, the Royal Concertgebouw Orchestra and alongside Marlis Petersen, Werner Güra and Gerald Finley.

From April 2015, she has focused on concerts.

== Awards ==
- 2007: Eberhard-Waechter-Medaille
- 2014: Helga de Oro as best mezzo-soprano

== Roles ==
=== Mezzo-soprano and contralto (from 2004) ===
- Flora Bervoix – Verdi: La Traviata – Volksoper 2004
- Boccaccio – Suppé: Boccaccio – Volksoper 2004, 2005 and 2006
- Erifile/Antiope – A. Scarlatti: Telemaco – Schwetzingen Festival 2005
- Orfeo – Gluck: Orfeo ed Euridice – Paris Opéra 2005, 2008; Salzburg Festival 2010
- Prinz Orlofsky – J. Strauss: Die Fledermaus – Volksoper 2005 and 2007, Vienna State Opera 2006 to 2015
- Carmen – Bizet: Carmen – Volksoper 2005 and 2007; Staatsoper Unter den Linden 2007
- Hänsel – Humperdinck: Hänsel und Gretel – Volksoper 2005 and 2006
- Dritte Dame – Mozart: Die Zauberflöte – Volksoper 2005, 2006 and 2007; Vienna State Opera 2006 to 2009
- Suzuki – Puccini: Madama Butterfly – Volksoper 2006; Vienna State Opera 2007/08
- Nancy – Flotow: Martha – Volksoper Wien 2006
- Hippolyta – Britten: A Midsummer Night's Dream – Volksoper 2006
- Magdalena – Kienzl: Der Evangelimann – Volksoper 2007
- Giustino – Legrenzi: Il Giustino – Schwetzingen Festival 2007
- Fenena – Verdi: Nabucco – Opernfestspiele St. Margarethen 2007; Vienna State Opera 2008/09; Bavarian State Opera 2011
- Marina Mnischek – Mussorgsky: Boris Godunow – Vienna State Opera 2007 and 2009
- Mrs. Quickly – Verdi: Falstaff – Vienna State Opera 2008 und 2009; Salzburg Festival 2013
- Polina – Tschaikowsky: Pique Dame – Vienna State Opera 2008 and 2009
- Zweite Norn – Wagner: Götterdämmerung – Vienna State Opera 2008/09; Bukarest/Enescu Festival 2013
- Ulrica – Verdi: Un ballo in maschera – Vienna State Opera 2009
- Brigitta – Korngold: Die tote Stadt – Vienna State Opera 2009
- Floßhilde – Wagner: Das Rheingold – Vienna State Opera 2009
- Grimgerde – Wagner: Die Walküre – Vienna State Opera 2009
- Olga – Tschaikowsky: Eugen Onegin – Vienna State Opera 2009
- Clairon – R. Strauss: Cappriccio – Vienna State Opera 2009
- Herodias – R. Strauss: Salome – Vienna State Opera 2009, 2015
- Waltraute – Wagner: Götterdämmerung – Vienna State Opera 2009, 2013; Bamberg 2013; Lucerne 2013; Bukarest/Enescu Festival 2013
- Gora – Reimann: Medea (premiere) – Vienna State Opera 2010
- Fricka – Wagner: Das Rheingold – Vienna State Opera 2010, 2014; Bavarian State Opera 2013, 2015
- Fricka – Wagner: Die Walküre – Vienna State Opera 2010, 2014; Bavarian State Opera 2013, 2015; Lucerne 2013; Bukarest/Enescu Festival 2013; Valencia 2013
- Smeton – Donizetti: Anna Bolena – Vienna State Opera 2011
- Ludmila – Smetana: Die verkaufte Braut – styriarte 2011
- Gaea – R. Strauss: Daphne – Vienna State Opera 2011
- Witwe Begbick – Weill: Aufstieg und Fall der Stadt Mahagonny – Vienna State Opera 2012
- Boulotte – Offenbach: Barbe-bleue – styriarte 2013
- Brangäne – Wagner: Tristan und Isolde – Vienna State Opera 2013
- Cherubino – Mozart: Le nozze di Figaro – Theater an der Wien 2014
- Despina – Mozart: Così fan tutte – Theater an der Wien 2014
- Erda – Wagner: Das Rheingold – Opera Nomori Festival Tokio 2014

=== Soprano (1998–2004) ===
- Susanna – Mozart: Le nozze di Figaro – Universität für Musik und darstellende Kunst Wien 1998 and 1999
- Frau Fluth – Nicolai: Die lustigen Weiber von Windsor – Universität für Musik und darstellende Kunst Wien 2000
- Contessa Almaviva – Mozart: Le nozze di Figaro – 4. Grazer Gartenfestival 2000; Universität für Musik und darstellende Kunst Wien 2001; Volksoper Wien 2003 and 2004
- Mme Euterpova – Menotti: Help! Help! The Globolinks! – Universität für Musik und darstellende Kunst Wien 2001
- Rosalinde – Strauss: Die Fledermaus – Akademie für Musik Krakau 2001
- Alcina – Handel: Alcina – Junge Oper St. Pölten 2001
- Pamina – Mozart: Die Zauberflöte – Volksoper Wien 2001, 2002 and 2003; Stadttheater St. Gallen 2012
- Fraarte – Handel: Radamisto – Salzburger Pfingstfestspiele 2002
- Don Pedro – Massenet: Don Quichotte – Wiener Klangbogen 2002
- Vera – Mascagni: Si – Volksoper Wien 2002
- Olga – Vives: La Generala – Volksoper Wien 2002 and 2003
- Donna Elvira – Mozart: Don Giovanni – Volksoper Wien 2002 and 2004

== Discography ==
CD:

- Franz Liszt: Via crucis S 53, Wiener Kammerchor, Johannes Prinz – Label: Carus
- Liszt: 23 Lieder (Liszt – Roots & Routes), with Eduard Kutrowatz (Klavier) – Label: Preiser Records, 2011
- Gustav Mahler: Lieder, with Ensemble Amarcord Wien – Label: material records, 2009
- Modest Mussorgsky: Lieder (Mussorgsky Dis-Covered), with Tscho Theissing, Arkady Shilkloper, Miki Skuta and Georg Breinschmid – Label: Preiser Records, 2010
- Mussorgsky: Lieder (Kinderstube), with Kirill Gerstein (Klavier) – Label: Preiser Records, 2012
- Hans Sommer: Orchesterlieder; with Bo Skovhus (baritone), Bamberger Symphoniker, conductor: Sebastian Weigle – Label: Tudor, 2012
- frauen.leben.liebe – Robert Schumann, Richard Wagner – with Eduard Kutrowatz (Klavier) – Label: Preiser Records, 2014
- Wer wagt mich zu höhnen? – Ein Ständchen für Richard Wagner und Giuseppe Verdi – with Amarcord Wien – Label: ORF, 2014

DVD:

- Bach: Christmas Oratorio BWV 248, Münchener Bach-Chor, Bach-Collegium München, Peter Schreier – Label: Obligat, 2005 (2 DVD)
- Beethoven: Missa solemnis, Royal Concertgebouw Orchestra, Nikolaus Harnoncourt – Label: Unitel Classica, 2013
- Donizetti: Anna Bolena (role: Smeton), Wiener Staatsoper, Evelino Pidò – Label: Deutsche Grammophon, 2011 (2 DVD)
- Aribert Reimann: Medea (role: Gora), Wiener Staatsoper, Michael Boder – Label: Arthaus, 2010 (DVD)
- Smetana: Die verkaufte Braut (Rolle: Ludmila), styriarte, Nikolaus Harnoncourt – Label: Styriarte Festival Edition, 2012 (DVD)
- Verdi: Nabucco (role: Fenena), Opernfestspiele St. Margarethen, Robert Herzl – Label: Euroarts, 2007 (DVD)
- Verdi: Falstaff (role: Mrs. Quickly), Salzburg Festival, Zubin Mehta – Label: Unitel Classica, 2013 (DVD)
