= Fiona Campbell (mezzo-soprano) =

Australian operatic mezzo-soprano

Fiona Campbell is an Australian operatic mezzo-soprano. In January 2023, she was appointed creative director of the Perth Symphony Orchestra after she had worked as state manager in Western Australia for Musica Viva. Campbell has worked with dozens of Australian and international conductors and orchestras, and with other soloists in chamber groups. Her repertoire, on stage and in recitals, ranges from Renaissance music to contemporary works of the 21st century, from oratorios, opera, French art songs, to musical theatre and cabaret. The Australian's Martin Buzacott called her "the best mezzo-soprano in Australia right now" in his review of an English-language production of Cinderella, or Goodness Triumphant for Opera Queensland in 2013.

== Career ==
Daughter of working-class Glaswegians who settled in Western Australia, Campbell learned piano and wanted to be a conductor. When her singing teacher at the Western Australian Academy of Performing Arts (WAAPA) suggested in her second year of studying a professional career, she switched. She graduated from WAAPA as a Master of Music in 1995 with a thesis, Peggy Glanville-Hicks' Opera Sappho, A Critical Examination. In 1994, she won the 1994 ABC Young Performer of the Year Award and the Australian Opera Awards. In 2011, she won the Limelight Award for Best Solo Performance. After several years in Britain with the Glyndebourne Chorus, she filled in for Susan Graham on José Carreras' tour of Japan and Korea and appeared then as his special guest artist in Australia (2008–2010).

Following her and countertenor David Walker's performances for Pinchgut Opera in Vivaldi's 1716 oratorio Juditha triumphans, which they also recorded, and Cavalli's 1644 opera Ormindo, she and Walker released the album Baroque Duets in 2011, conducted by Neal Peres Da Costa. Campbell self-released the solo album Love + Loss in 2012, featuring the cantatas La Lucrezia (1708) by Handel, Bella madre de fiori (1680s) by Scarlatti and Arianna a Naxos (1789) by Haydn. In 2020, she performed in a recording of Ross Harris' Symphony No. 6 by the Auckland Philharmonia Orchestra conducted by Antony Hermus.

Campbell is a founding member of Katie Noonan's Australian Vocal Ensemble (AVÉ)

In October 2022, she performed with Sara Macliver in the world premiere of Elena Kats-Chernin's Ave Maria by the West Australian Symphony Orchestra conducted by Pietari Inkinen.

Campbell is a presenter at ABC Classic.

In the 2024 Australia Day Honours, Campbell was awarded the Medal of the Order of Australia (OAM) for "service to the performing arts through music".

== Private life ==
Campbell is married to Brendon Ellmer, general manager of the State Theatre Centre of Western Australia, and they have a son and a daughter.
