= Orchestra of the Antipodes =

Orchestra of the Antipodes is an Australian early music ensemble founded by Antony Walker and Alison Johnston. They play baroque music on early instruments. They were founded alongside vocal ensemble Cantillation and the Sinfonia Australis orchestra. They received a nomination for the 2012 ARIA Award for Best Classical Album with their album Bach: Brandenburg Concertos.

Orchestra of the Antipodes often performs with the Pinchgut Opera and appears on many ABC Classics albums. Albums they appear on include Teddy Tahu Rhodes' The Voice (ARIA winner), Sara Macliver and Sally-Anne Russell's Bach Arias and Duets and Baroque Duets (ARIA nominees).

== Discography ==
- Orchestra of the Antipodes
- Bach: Brandenburg Concertos (2011) – ABC Classics
- Concertos, Suites & Overtures (2013) – ABC Classics
- Sara Macliver, Alexandra Sherman, Christopher Field, Paul McMahon, Teddy Tahu Rhodes, Cantillation, Orchestra of the Antipodes, Antony Walker
  - Handel: Messiah (2002) – ABC Classics
  - Handel: Messiah Highlights (2003) – ABC Classics
- Teddy Tahu Rhodes, Sinfonia Australia, Orchestra of the Antipodes, Cantillation, Antony Walker
  - The Voice (2004) – ABC Classics
- Sara Macliver, Sally-Anne Russell, Orchestra of the Antipodes, Antony Walker
  - Bach Arias and Duets (2003) – ABC Classics
  - Baroque Duets (2005) – ABC Classics
- Emma Kirkby, Cantillation, Orchestra of the Antipodes, Antony Walker
  - Magnificat (2006) – ABC Classics
- Pinchgut Opera
  - Semele (2003) – ABC Classics
  - Purcell: The Fairy Queen (2004) – ABC Classics
  - Monteverdi: L'Orfeo (2005) – ABC Classics
  - Rameau: Dardanus (2006) – ABC Classics
  - Mozart: Idomeneo (2007) – ABC Classics
  - Charpentier: David and Jonathan (2009) – ABC Classics
  - Gluck: Iphigénie en Tauride (2015) – ABC Classics

== ARIA Music Awards ==
The ARIA Music Awards is an annual awards ceremony that recognises excellence, innovation, and achievement across all genres of Australian music. They commenced in 1987.

Year	Nominee / work	Award	Result	Ref.
2012	Bach: Brandenburg Concertos	Best Classical Album	Nominated	
