= Catherine Dubosc =

French soprano

Catherine Dubosc (born 12 March 1959) is a French soprano. Born in Lille, she studied with Eric Tappy at the Opéra National de Lyon, before joining that company in 1985. She is well known for her Mozart roles, but she has also sung operas written significantly earlier (Giasone) and later (Dialogues of the Carmelites).

== Recordings ==
- Poulenc: Mélodies, Catherine Dubosc with Pascal Rogé, Felicity Lott at al. Decca CD
- Berlioz: Les Troyens (Ascagne), The Montréal Symphony Orchestra and Chorus, conducted by Charles Dutoit. 4 CD Decca 1994
