= Antony Walker (conductor) =

Australian conductor

- Born: Sydney, Australia
- Origin: Australia
- Genres: Classical
- Occupations: Conductor, music director, artistic director

Antony Walker is an Australian conductor who currently resides in Washington, D.C. He has held the positions of musical director of Sydney Philharmonia Choirs, Chorus Master and staff conductor of Welsh National Opera, and is currently artistic director and conductor of Washington Concert Opera and music director of Pittsburgh Opera. He co-founded Pinchgut Opera, the vocal ensemble Cantillation and the orchestras Sinfonia Australis and Orchestra of the Antipodes. Educated at Sydney Grammar School, and an honours graduate of the University of Sydney, Walker trained as a singer (tenor), pianist, cellist, and composer.

At the Metropolitan Opera in New York, Walker has led performances of Gluck's Orfeo ed Euridice, The Barber of Seville, The Magic Flute, and Les Pêcheurs de Perles, as well as the National Council Auditions Grand Finals Concert in 2016.

For English National Opera he has conducted Lucia di Lammermoor and The Tales of Hoffmann.

Walker has appeared as guest conductor with Opera Australia, West Australian Opera, English National Opera, Santa Fe Opera, New York City Opera, Wolf Trap Opera, The Glimmerglass Festival, The Merola Program of the San Francisco Opera, Chautauqua Opera, Minnesota Opera, Arizona Opera, Lyric Opera of Kansas City, North Carolina Opera, Teatro Comunale di Bologna, and Opera di Firenze. In 2008 he conducted the US premiere of William Walton's opera Troilus and Cressida at the Opera Theater of St Louis, and in the 2018–19 season for Washington Concert Opera he conducted the US premiere of Gounod's Sapho (starring Kate Lindsay) and the first performance in the US since 1835 of Rossini's Zelmira (with Silva tro SantaFé, Lawrence Brownlee, and Vivica Genaux). In 2022 Walker conducted the world premiere of In a Grove, by Christopher Cerrone, for Pittsburgh Opera.

He has conducted the Sydney, Melbourne, Queensland, Adelaide, Tasmanian, and West Australian Symphony Orchestras, the Australian Chamber Orchestra, the BBC National Orchestra of Wales, Orchestre Colonne in Paris, Thessaloniki State Symphony, and made his debut with the Mozarteum Orchester in Salzburg in Jan 2019 with a program of Berlioz and Tchaikovsky. He is noted as a fine interpreter of "bel canto", Rossini, French opera, Verdi, Puccini, the Viennese classical composers, Bach, and Handel, as well as French and English composers of the 20th century.

== Selected recordings ==
- Marc-Antoine Charpentier: David + Jonathan (David et Jonathas H.490), Anders J. Dahlin (David), Sara Macliver (Jonathan), Dean Robinson (Saul), Paul McMahon (La Pythonisse), Richard Anderson (Achis), David Parkin (Ghost of Samuel), Simon Lobelson (Joabel); Pinchgut Opera, Orchestra of the Antipodes & Cantillation conducted by Antony Walker, (2 CD ABC Classics, cat. 4763691) 2009.
