= David Hansen (countertenor) =

Australian countertenor (born 1981)

- Born: 6 October 1981 (age 45); Sydney, Australia
- Education: St Andrew's Cathedral School; Newington College; Sydney Conservatorium of Music
- Occupation: Countertenor

David Hansen (born 6 October 1981) is an Australian countertenor.

== Biography ==
Hansen was born in Sydney, Australia, and attended St Andrew's Cathedral School and Newington College. He studied violin, piano, and was a boy treble in school choirs. He studied in the class of Andrew Dalton at the Sydney Conservatorium of Music. He continued his musical education with James Bowman, David Harper and Graham Pushee.

== Career ==
He made his first European appearances in 2004 at the Aix-en-Provence Festival, performing in Purcell's Dido and Aeneas. Hansen first performed in the United Kingdom in concerts with the Scottish Chamber Orchestra, conducted by Emmanuelle Haïm. He also performed with Il Complesso Barocco in Fernando by Handel, conducted by Alan Curtis during the Spoleto Festival in Italy.

He sang roles in various operas, including Bertarido in Handel's Rodelinda, conducted by Alan Curtis, Nerone in Monteverdi's L'incoronazione di Poppea at Victorian Opera, Ottone in Vivaldi's Griselda at Pinchgut Opera and Cherubino in Mozart's Le nozze di Figaro at the Teatro Comunale di Sassari. He also performed in the U.S. premiere of Thomas Adès' The Tempest at the Santa Fe Opera, conducted by Alan Gilbert, Handel's Giulio Cesare at the Theater an der Wien, conducted by René Jacobs, Monteverdi's L'Orfeo at the Berlin State Opera, conducted by René Jacobs, Handel's Semele at the Théâtre Royal de la Monnaie, conducted by Christophe Rousset, in Giovanni Andrea Bontempi's Il Paride at the Innsbruck Festival of Early Music, directed by Christina Pluhar. He has worked with Stefan Herheim, Jonathan Kent, Barrie Kosky and Christof Loy.

Hansen's non-operatic engagements have included Carmina Burana with the Berlin Philharmonic, conducted by Sir Simon Rattle, Handel's Solomon, conducted by René Jacobs, Bach's St John Passion, performed with Les Musiciens du Louvre Grenoble conducted by Marc Minkowski, Handel's Parnasso in festa, Messiah and Giulio Cesare conducted by Andrea Marcon, Fabio Biondi and Emmanuelle Haïm, respectively, and Britten's Canticles, at the Wiener Konzerthaus.

== Repertoire ==
=== Opera ===
Composer	Title	Role
Adès	The Tempest	Trinculo
Bontempi	Il Paride	Paride
Britten	A Midsummer Night's Dream	Oberon
Cavalli	Giasone	Giasone
Gluck	Orfeo ed Euridice	Orfeo
Gluck	Paride ed Elena	Paride
Handel	Agrippina	Nerone
Handel	Alcina	Ruggiero / Oberto
Handel	Ariodante	Ariodante
Handel	Fernando	Fernando
Handel	Giulio Cesare	Giulio Cesare / Sesto
Handel	Partenope	Arsace
Handel	Rodelinda	Bertarido
Handel	Serse	Serse / Arsamene
Handel	Teseo	Teseo
Hasse	Piramo e Tisbe	Piramo
Ligeti	Le Grand Macabre	Prince Go-Go
Monteverdi	Il ritorno d'Ulisse in patria	Telemaco
Monteverdi	L'incoronazione di Poppea	Nerone
Monteverdi	L'Orfeo	La Speranza
Mozart	La clemenza di Tito	Sesto
Mozart	Le nozze di Figaro	Cherubino
Mozart	Mitridate, Re di Ponto	Arbate / Farnace
Purcell	Dido and Aeneas	Spirit
Scarlatti	La Dirindina	Liscione
Strauss	Die Fledermaus	Prince Orlofsky
Vivaldi	Catone in Utica	Cesare
Vivaldi	Griselda	Ottone
Vivaldi	Motezuma	Fernando

=== Oratorios ===
Composer	Title	Role
Bach	Magnificat	Alto
Bach	Mass in B Minor	Alto
Bach	St. John Passion	Alto
Bach	St. Matthew Passion	Alto
Handel	Alexander Balus	Alexander Balus
Handel	Belshazzar	Cyrus
Handel	Dixit Dominus	Alto
Handel	Hercules	Lichas
Handel	Jephtha	Hamor
Handel	Messiah	Alto
Handel	Saul	David
Handel	Semele	Athamas
Handel	Solomon	Solomon
Handel	The Choice of Hercules	Hercules
Handel	Theodora	Didymus

== Discography ==
=== Albums ===
List of albums, with selected details
Title	Details
Rivals – Arias for Farinelli & Co.	Released: April 2013; Format: CD, Digital; Label: Sony Music
Cavalli: Giasone (live)	Released: July 2015; Format: CD, Digital; Label: Pinchgut
One Charming Night	Released: November 2019; Format: CD, Digital; Label: Grappa

== Awards and nominations ==
=== ARIA Music Awards ===
The ARIA Music Awards is an annual awards ceremony that recognises excellence, innovation, and achievement across all genres of Australian music. They commenced in 1987.

Year	Nominee / work	Award	Result	Ref.
2013	Rivals: Arias for Farinelli & Co.	Best Classical Album	Nominated	
