= Armonico Consort =

British music company

Armonico Consort is a British company founded in 2001 by conductor and organist Christopher Monks, which specialises in producing performances of Renaissance and Baroque music. In 2002 the company oversaw the creation of a series of academies designed to provide choral training for schoolchildren.

The company’s period musicians and instrumentalists have an international reputation in the field, and its partners and collaborators have included Sir Willard White, Dame Emma Kirkby, and Dame Evelyn Glennie. Armonico Consort is known for its innovative productions, most notably its 2005 production of Henry Purcell’s The Fairy-Queen and its performances of Mozart’s Magic Flute at the Barbican Centre in London in 2007. In 2012 Armonico Consort’s opera, Too Hot To Handel, featuring the music of Baroque composer George Frideric Handel, attracted highly positive reviews from critics. Choirs from Armonico Consort’s academies performed at the Royal Albert Hall in London in 2013.

== Operas ==
Armonico Consort’s operas use choral, orchestral and entertainment groups to re-invent classic Baroque opera pieces. The company is best known for its inventive revisions of Purcell’s Fairy Queen (2005) and Mozart’s Magic Flute (2007), both of which were well received by critics. The Magic Flute was praised by the Independent for “its clever use of space, innovative presentation of the trials by fire and water, and highly entertaining introduction to Papagena.”

In recent years Armonico Consort has preferred to devise new operas combining music from the Baroque period with stage puppetry, circus, acrobatics and comedy in productions such as Monteverdi’s Flying Circus (2010) and Baroque Around the Clock (2012). The Guardian’s response to Monteverdi’s Flying Circus was lukewarm but concluded that "anything intended to gain a new audience for this composer's astonishing work must have its heart in the right place."

Armonico Consort’s latest opera, Too Hot to Handel, was toured nationally to positive reviews. The opera, featuring the William Towers (countertenor), collected songs from several of Handel’s operas within the framework of a story about the relationship of two present-day lovers. It was praised by the Independent for its wit and the quality of its performances.

Armonico Consort’s operas have been performed at the Mostly Mozart Festival in New York City, the Buxton Opera Festival, Llandudno Opera Festival, Brighton Festival and Lichfield festival.

== Concerts ==
The Armonico Consort choir and orchestra perform around 50 concerts per year. The company has performed at many highly acclaimed UK venues such as the Barbican in London, Wigmore Hall, Cadogan Hall, the Bridgewater Hall, and King’s College, Cambridge, working with a number of revered musicians such as Dame Emma Kirkby, Dame Evelyn Glennie, Sir Willard White, James Bowman, Crispian Steele-Perkins, Natalie Clein and Nicola Benedetti. Outside the UK, Armonico Consort have performed in Naples, Tel Aviv and in Notre Dame de Paris cathedral in Paris.

In 2010 Armonico Consort received wide acclaim for their recording of their Naked Byrd programme, which featured compositions from William Byrd, John Tavener, Anton Bruckner and Thomas Tallis. The Independent awarded the second instalment of the recording five stars, while the influential online music guide Allmusic.com awarded it four out of a possible five stars, noting that "the whole thing fits together in a very satisfying way, the young singers are superb, and the engineering… fits the music's sound beautifully." In 2011 the company performed Verdi’s Requiem in Warwick, and in 2012, as part of their tenth anniversary celebrations, they were joined by Nicola Benedetti for a performance of Vivaldi’s violin concertos.

== AC Academy ==
AC Academy is the charitable wing of Armonico Consort, which aims to bring music education into schools. It was created in response to Director Christopher Monks’ frustration with the lack of adequate musical education in schools he had been visiting.

AC Academy appeals for funding in order to run after-school choir creation projects. Much of the work that the AC Academy carries out is in the bottom 10% of deprived areas in the UK, such as Hillfields in Coventry, Sparkbrook in Birmingham, and Newham, Hackney, and Tower Hamlets in London. Over the past few years, they have connected with a number of schools in London and the West Midlands (region) in training members of staff to be choir leaders, in order for them to prepare a mass gala concert involving over 1,500 children at the Royal Albert Hall, Around the World in 18 Tunes, scheduled for March 2013.
