= Kanen Breen =

Australian operatic tenor

Kanen Breen (born 1973 or 1974) is an Australian operatic tenor.

Breen first performed with the Victoria State Opera, before roles with Opera Australia and Rodolfo in Baz Luhrmann's Broadway production of La bohème.

He performed with his close friend Jacqueline Dark, with whom he shares a son, in the cabaret Strange Bedfellows at the 2017 Adelaide Cabaret Festival.

He has received the Helpmann Award for Best Male Performer in a Supporting Role in an Opera three times, for Opera Australia's Partenope in 2011, for Saul at the Adelaide Festival in 2017 and for Pinchgut Opera's L'incoronazione di Poppea in 2018.
