= Andrew Goodwin (tenor) =

Australian born operatic tenor

Andrew Goodwin is an Australian born operatic tenor.

== Early years ==
Goodwin was born in Sydney, Australia, and began learning the violin at the age of five. His father, a school teacher, was a fan of classical music and collector of opera gramophone records. While singing in St. Andrew’s Cathedral choir, he continued learning the violin, piano, and organ.

== Education ==
Following a suggestion by his piano teacher that he study voice in Russia, Goodwin left Australia for Europe in 1999. He studied in the Saint Petersburg Conservatory under Professor Lyov Nikolaevich Morozov. Goodwin graduated from the Conservatory in June 2005. In 2006, he began a postgraduate diploma in vocal studies at the Royal Academy of Music.

== Career ==
Goodwin's operatic debut was as Fenton in Verdi's Falstaff for Opera Australia in January 2006. Later that year he performed Lensky in a new Production of Eugene Onegin by Dmitry Chernyakov at the Bolshoi Theatre, Russia, a rare achievement by a foreigner. He is also now a regular soloist with the St Petersburg Symphony Orchestra and a cultural ambassador for Australia on the world stage.

Since 2006, Goodwin has been a soloist with the Bolshoi Theatre (Moscow, Russia). He has also appeared at The Sydney Opera house, The Arts Centre, Melbourne, Tokyo Opera City Concert Hall, Seoul Arts Centre, National Concert Hall Taipei, Teatro Real, Madrid, Gran Teatre de Liceu, Barcelona, La Scala, Milan, Philharmonic Hall, St. Peterburg, Great Hall of the Moscow Conservatory.

A list of Goodwin's roles includes:

- Lensky (Bolshoi Theatre, Moscow) Eugene Onegin by Tchaikovsky
- Fenton (Sydney) Falstaff by Giuseppe Verdi
- Belmonte (Sydney) The Abduction from the Seraglio; also known as Il Seraglio by Mozart
- Don Ottavio (Sydney) Don Giovanni by Mozart
- Janek (Sydney) The Makropulos Affair by Leoš Janáček
- Tamino (Sydney) The Magic Flute by Mozart
- Leandre (Tel Aviv) The Mock Doctor by Charles Gounod
- Dante (St.Peterburg) Francesca da Rimini by Sergei Rachmaninov
- Avvakum (Moscow) Boyarinya Morozova by Rodion Shchedrin
- Alfred (Moscow) Die Fledermaus by Johann Strauss II

In December 2010, Goodwin played Orpheus in the Pinchgut Opera production of L'anima del filosofo by Joseph Haydn.

== Awards ==
Goodwin has won a number of competitions and prizes in Australia and abroad, including:

- Marten Bequest Travelling Scholarship
- Sir Robert Askin Operatic Travelling Scholarship
- Australian Opera Auditions Committee Joan Sutherland and Richard Bonynge Scholarship
- Finalist, 2004 Australian Singing Competition
- Nelly Apt Travelling Scholarship to attend the International Vocal Art's Institute at Tel Aviv in Israel
- April 2004, Amber Nightingale singing competition at Kaliningrad in Russia
- November 2005, 2nd prize in the Elena Obrastzova Singing competition at St. Petersburg; also won the Audience vote and prize for the best German Lieder
