= The Fairy-Queen =

Semi-opera by Henry Purcell

- Semi-opera by Henry Purcell
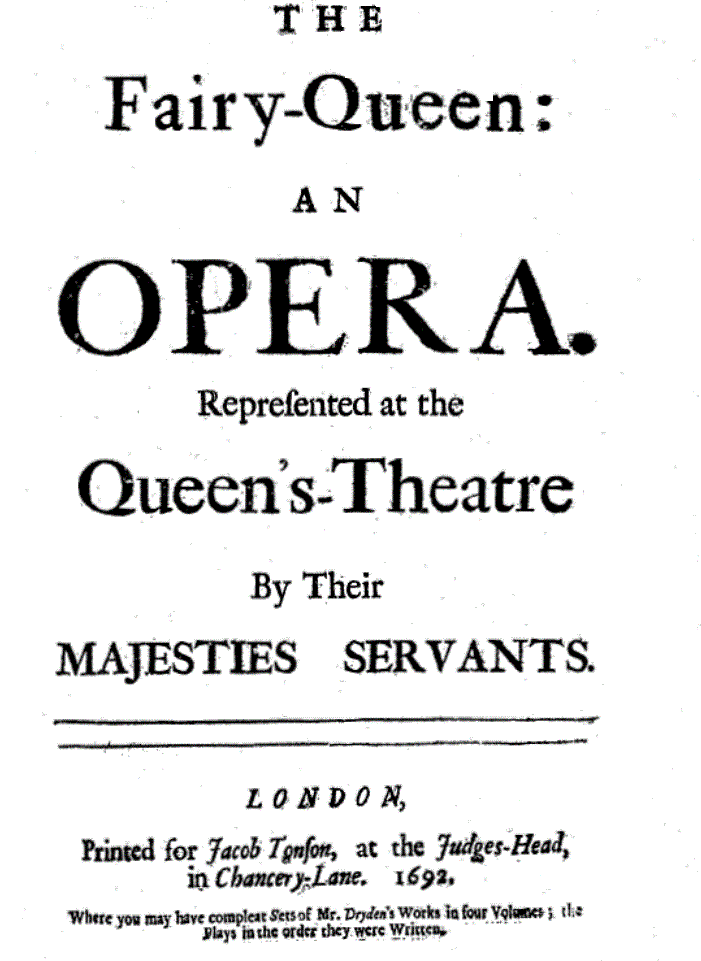
- Title page of the original printed edition
- Description: Restoration spectacular
- Based on: A Midsummer Night's Dream by William Shakespeare
- Premiere: 2 May 1692; Queen's Theatre, Dorset Garden, London

The Fairy-Queen (1692; Purcell catalogue number Z.629) is a semi-opera by Henry Purcell; a "Restoration spectacular". The libretto is an anonymous adaptation of William Shakespeare's comedy A Midsummer Night's Dream. First performed in 1692, The Fairy-Queen was composed three years before Purcell's death at the age of 36. Following his death, the score was lost and only rediscovered early in the twentieth century.

Purcell did not set any of Shakespeare's text to music; instead he composed music for short masques in every act but the first. The play itself was also slightly modernised in keeping with seventeenth-century dramatic conventions, but in the main the spoken text is as Shakespeare wrote it. The masques are related to the play metaphorically, rather than literally. Many critics have stated that they bear no relationship to the play. Recent scholarship has shown that the opera, which ends with a masque featuring Hymen, the God of Marriage, was composed for the fifteenth wedding anniversary of King William III and Queen Mary II.

Growing interest in Baroque music and the rise of the countertenor contributed to the work's re-entry into the repertoire. The opera received several full-length recordings in the latter part of the 20th century and several of its arias, including "The Plaint" ("O let me weep"), have become popular recital pieces.

In July 2009, in celebration of the 350th anniversary of Purcell's birth, The Fairy-Queen was performed by Glyndebourne Festival Opera using a new edition of the score, prepared for the Purcell Society by Bruce Wood and Andrew Pinnock.

== Original production ==
The Fairy-Queen was first performed on 2 May 1692 at the Queen's Theatre, Dorset Garden in London by the United Company. The author or at least co-author of the libretto was presumably Thomas Betterton, the manager of Dorset Garden Theatre, with whom Purcell worked regularly. This belief is based on an analysis of Betterton's stage directions. A collaboration between several playwrights is also feasible. Choreography for the various dances was provided by Josias Priest, who also worked on Dioclesian and King Arthur, and who was associated with Dido and Aeneas.

A letter describing the original performance shows that the parts of Titania and Oberon were played by children of eight or nine. Presumably other fairies were also played by children; this affects our perspective on the staging.

== Context and analysis ==
Following the huge success of his operas Dioclesian (1690) and King Arthur (1691), Purcell composed The Fairy-Queen in 1692. Purcell's "First" and "Second Music" were played while the audience were taking their seats. The "Act Tunes" are played between acts, as the curtain was normally raised at the beginning of a performance and not lowered until the end. After act 1, each act commences with a short symphony (3–5 minutes).

The English tradition of semi-opera, to which The Fairy-Queen belongs, demanded that most of the music within the play be introduced through the agency of supernatural beings, the exception being pastoral or drunken characters. All the masques in The Fairy-Queen are presented by Titania or Oberon. Originally act 1 contained no music, but due to the work's enormous success it was revived in 1693, when Purcell added the scene of the Drunken Poet and two further songs later on in the work; "Ye gentle spirits of the air" and "The Plaint". As noted above, each masque is subtly related to the action in the play during that particular act in a metaphorical way. In this manner we have Night and Sleep in act 2, which is apt as that act of the play consists of Oberon's plans to use the power of the "love-in-idleness" flower to confuse various loves, and it is therefore appropriate for the allegorical figures of Secrecy, Mystery et al. to usher in a night of enchantment. The masque for Bottom in act 3 includes metamorphoses, songs of both real and feigned love, and beings who are not what they seem. The Reconciliation masque between Oberon and Titania at the end of act 4 prefigures the final masque. The scene changes to a Garden of Fountains, denoting King William's hobby, just after Oberon says "bless these Lovers' Nuptial Day". The Four Seasons tell us that the marriage here celebrated is a good one all year round and "All Salute the rising Sun"/...The Birthday of King Oberon". The kings of England were traditionally likened to the sun (Oberon = William. Significantly, William and Mary were married on his birthday, 4 November.). The Chinese scene in the final masque is in homage to Queen Mary's famous collection of china. The garden shown above it and the exotic animals bring King William back into the picture and Hymen's song in praise of their marriage, plus the stage direction bringing (Mary's) china vases containing (William's) orange trees to the front of the stage complete the symbolism.

== The music ==
Written as he approached the end of his brief career, The Fairy-Queen contains some of Purcell's finest theatre music, as musicologists have agreed for generations. In particular, Constant Lambert was a great admirer; from it he arranged a suite and in collaboration with Edward Dent arranged the work to form the then new Covent Garden opera company's first postwar production. It shows to excellent effect Purcell's complete mastery of the pungent English style of Baroque counterpoint, as well as displaying his absorption of Italian influences. Several arias such as "The Plaint", "Thrice happy lovers" and "Hark! the echoing air" have entered the discographic repertory of many singers outside their original context.

The orchestra for The Fairy-Queen consists of two recorders, two oboes, two trumpets, timpani, string instruments and harpsichord continuo.

== Performance history ==
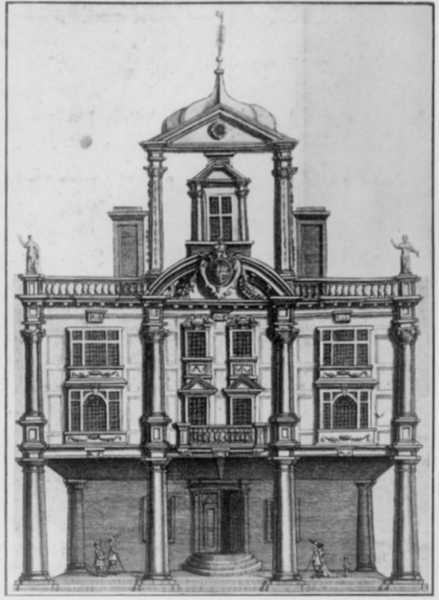
The Queen's Theatre, Dorset Garden where The Fairy-Queen was first performed.

Following Purcell's premature death, his opera Dioclesian remained popular until well into the eighteenth century, but the score of The Fairy-Queen was lost and only rediscovered early in the twentieth century. Other works like it fell into obscurity. Changing tastes were not the only reason for this; the voices employed had also become difficult to find. The list of singers below shows the frequent employment of the male alto, or countertenor, in the semi-opera, a voice which, after Purcell, essentially vanished from the stage, probably due to the rise of Italian opera and the attendant castrati. After that Romantic opera emerged, with the attendant predominance of the tenor. Until the early music revival, the male alto survived mainly in the ecclesiastical tradition of all-male church choirs and twentieth-century American vocal quartets.

However, Purcell's music (and with it The Fairy-Queen) was resuscitated by two related movements: a growing interest in Baroque music and the rise of the countertenor, led by pioneers such as Alfred Deller and Russell Oberlin. The former movement led to performances of long-neglected composers such as Purcell, John Dowland, John Blow and even George Frideric Handel, while the latter complemented it by providing a way of making such performances as authentic as possible as regards the original music and the composer's intentions (less true for Handel, where countertenors appear as castrati replacements). This has led to The Fairy-Queen's increased popularity, and numerous recordings have been made, often using period instruments. The format of the work presents problems to modern directors, who must decide whether or not to present Purcell's music as part of the original play, which uncut is rather lengthy. Savage calculated a length of four hours. The decision to curtail the play is usually taken together with the resolution to modernise to such an extent that the cohesion between music, text and action sketched above is entirely lost, a criticism levelled at the English National Opera's 1995 production directed by David Pountney. The production was released on video the same year, and revived by the company in 2002. A bold approach was taken at the Brazilian Opera Company's 2000 staging by Luiz Päetow, with the libretto becoming unstuck in time.

In July 2009, two months before the 350th anniversary of Purcell's birth, The Fairy-Queen was performed in a new edition, prepared for The Purcell Society by Bruce Wood and Andrew Pinnock, which restored the entire theatrical entertainment as well as the original pitch used by Purcell. The performance by Glyndebourne Festival Opera with the Orchestra of the Age of Enlightenment conducted by William Christie was repeated later that month at the Royal Albert Hall as part of the BBC Proms.

In June 2016, the opera was performed by the Hungarian State Opera, in a new, neo-noir production directed by András Almási-Tóth

== Roles ==
The role of Mopsa was originally performed by a soprano; however, a later revision by Purcell stated that it was to be performed by "Mr. Pate in woman's habit", presumably to have a grotesque effect and highlight the refrain "No, no, no, no, no; no kissing at all" in the dialogue between Corydon and Mopsa. Also, it is not entirely clear what the word "countertenor" means in this context. The record is ambivalent as to whether Purcell (himself a countertenor) used a tenor with a particularly high range (though lighter at the top) and tessitura (known sometimes as an haute-contre, the descendants of the contratenors alti of medieval polyphony) or a falsettist. It seems that throughout his career he used both. However, purely for reasons of dramatic verisimilitude, it is more likely than not that the travesty role of Mopsa was taken by a falsettist, and the presence of a duet for two male altos ("Let the fifes and the clarions") makes it seem more probable that for this work falsettists were employed.

For a list of non-singing characters see A Midsummer Night's Dream, with the exception of Hippolyta, who was removed by Purcell's librettist.

Roles, voice types
Role	Voice type	Premiere cast, 2 May 1692
Drunken Poet	bass	
First Fairy	soprano	
Second Fairy	soprano	
Night	soprano	
Mystery	soprano	Mary Hodgson
Secrecy	countertenor	
Sleep	bass	
Corydon	bass	
Mopsa	soprano/countertenor	
Nymph	soprano	
3 Attendants to Oberon	1 soprano, 2 countertenors	
Phoebus	tenor	
Spring	soprano	
Summer	countertenor	
Autumn	tenor	
Winter	bass	
Juno	soprano	
Chinese Man	countertenor	
Chinese Woman, Daphne	soprano	
Hymen	bass	
Chorus: Fairies and Attendants.

== Synopsis ==
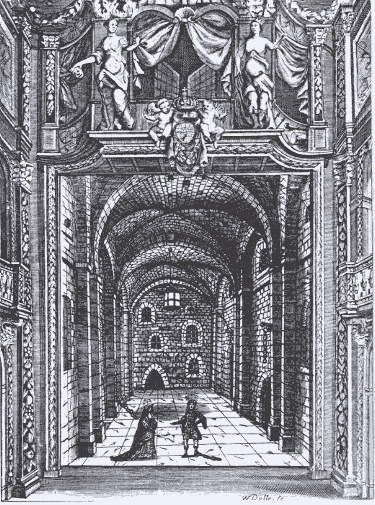
View of the stage of the Dorset Garden Theatre, as it was pictured in the libretto of The Empress of Morocco (1673), see Elkanah Settle.

For the plot of the play see A Midsummer Night's Dream. Only a synopsis of scenes provided with music is given here.

=== Masque I (The Drunken Poet) ===
The first scene set to music occurs after Titania has left Oberon, following an argument over the ownership of a little Indian boy. Two of her fairies sing of the delights of the countryside ("Come, come, come, come, let us leave the town"). A drunken, stuttering poet enters, singing "Fill up the bowl". The stuttering has led many to believe the scene is based on the habits of Thomas d'Urfey. However, it may also be poking fun at Elkanah Settle, who stuttered as well and was long thought to be the librettist, due to an error in his 1910 biography. The fairies mock the drunken poet and drive him away. With its quick repartee and its broadly "realistic" portrayal of the poor victim, the Masque of the Drunken Poet is the closest episode in Purcell's London stage works to full-fledged opera as the Italians knew it.

=== Masque II (The Night and Sleep) ===
It begins after Oberon has ordered Puck to anoint the eyes of Demetrius with the love-juice. Titania and her fairies merrily revel ("Come all ye songsters of the sky"), and Night ("See, even Night"), Mystery ("Mystery's song"), Secrecy ("One charming night") and Sleep ("Hush, no more, be silent all") lull them asleep and leave them to pleasant dreams.

=== Masque III (Corydon and Mopsa) ===
Titania has fallen in love with Bottom (now equipped with his ass' head), much to Oberon's gratification. A Nymph sings of the pleasures and torments of love ("If love's a sweet passion") and after several dances, Titania and Bottom are entertained by the foolish, loving banter of two haymakers, Corydon and Mopsa.

=== Masque IV (Phoebus and the Four Seasons) ===
It begins after Titania has been freed from her enchantment, commencing with a brief divertissement to celebrate Oberon's birthday ("Now the Night", and the abovementioned "Let the fifes and the clarions"), but for the most part it is a masque of the god Phoebus ("When the cruel winter") and the Four Seasons (Spring; "Thus, the ever grateful spring", Summer; "Here's the Summer", Autumn; "See my many coloured fields", and Winter; "Now Winter comes slowly").

=== Masque V (The Plaint and Hymen) ===
After Theseus has been told of the lovers' adventures in the wood, it begins with the goddess Juno singing an epithalamium, "Thrice happy lovers", followed by a woman who sings the well-known "The Plaint" ("O let me weep"). A Chinese man and woman enter singing several songs about the joys of their world. ("Thus, the gloomy world", "Thus happy and free" and "Yes, Xansi"). Two other Chinese women summon Hymen, who sings in praise of married bliss, thus uniting the wedding theme of A Midsummer Night's Dream, with the celebration of William and Mary's anniversary.

== Use in performances ==
German choreographer Pina Bausch used music from two of Purcell's works, The Fairy-Queen and Dido and Aeneas, in her most famous dance work, Café Müller.

== Recordings ==
Audio

- Bruno Maderna, (Excerpts) Orchestra dell'Angelicum of Milan, (1 LP) – 1957 – Fonit Angelicum LPA970. This was also the first recording of Cathy Berberian mentioned on the cover as Catherine Berio.
- Benjamin Britten, English Chamber Orchestra, Ambrosian Opera Chorus, (2 CDs) – 1970 – Decca 4685612
- Alfred Deller, The Deller Consort, Stour Music Chorus (2 CDs) – 1972 – Harmonia Mundi
- John Eliot Gardiner, The English Baroque Soloists The Monteverdi Choir, (2 CDs) – 1982 – Archiv Produktion 419 221–2
- William Christie, Les Arts Florissants (2 CDs) – 1989 – Harmonia Mundi HMC 90 1308/0
- David van Asch, The Scholars Baroque Ensemble (2 CDs) – 1992 – Naxos 8.550660-1
- Roger Norrington, The London Classical Players, The Schütz Choir of London (2 CDs) – 1994 – EMI Classics 7243 5 55234 2 6
- Harry Christophers, The Sixteen, (2 CDs) – 1993 – (Coro COR16005
- Ton Koopman, Amsterdam Baroque Orchestra & Choir, (2 CDs) – 1994 – Erato 98507
- Nikolaus Harnoncourt, Concentus Musicus Wien, Arnold Schoenberg Choir (2 CDs) – 1995 – Teldec Classics 4509-97684-2
- Antony Walker, Cantillation, Orchestra of the Antipodes, (2 CDs) – 2005 – ABC Classics ABC4762879
- Christopher Monks, Armonico Consort, (1 CD) – 2006 – Deux-Elles DXL1120
- Ottavio Dantone, Accademia Bizantina & New English Voices, (2 CDs) – 2012 – Brilliant Classics 94221
- Paul McCreesh, Gabrieli Consort, (2 CDs) 2020 Signum Records : SIGCD615

Video

- Nicholas Kok, David Pountney (stage director), English National Opera, (1 DVD) – 1995 – Arthaus Musik 100200
- William Christie, Jonathan Kent (stage director), The Glyndebourne Chorus & Orchestra of the Age of Enlightenment, (2 DVDs) – 2010 – Opus Arte OA1031D
- Cathryn Robertson, (director, producer) Ballet B.C. and CBC television. Inside the Faerie Queene

== See also ==
- List of compositions by Henry Purcell
- A Midsummer Night's Dream (opera by Britten)
- The Modification and Instrumentation of a Famous Hornpipe as a Merry and Altogether Sincere Homage to Uncle Alfred
