= Wiener Kammerchor =

Choir

The Wiener Kammerchor is a chamber choir founded in Vienna in 1947 by the musicologist Franz Andreas Weißenbäck - he was also its music director for many years. In 1995, it merged with the Kammerchor der Musikhochschule Wien and since then it has mainly consisted of students and graduates from the Musikhochschule. From 1995 to 2007 its music director was Johannes Prinz - he was succeeded by Michael Grohotolsky, its music director since 2007.
