= 1688 in music =

The year 1688 in music involved some significant events.

== Events ==
- Ferdinando de' Medici, Grand Prince of Tuscany, hired Bartolomeo Cristofori as his keeper of musical instruments.

== Published popular music ==
- Lilliburlero in popular circulation

== Classical music ==
- John Blow – Ode for New Year's Day
- Marc-Antoine Charpentier
  - Magnificat à 4 voix sans instruments, H.76
  - Dixit Dominus H.202
- Gottfried Finger – 12 Sonatas for Diverse Instruments, Op.1
- Johann Philipp Krieger – O Jesu, du mein Leben
- Henry Purcell – A Fool's Preferment, Z.571
- André Raison – Premier livre d'orgue
- Johann Schenck – Tyd en Konst-Oeffeningen, Op.2
- Daniel Speer
  - Philomela angelica cantionum sacrarum
  - Musikalisch-türkischer Eulenspiegel
- Giuseppe Torelli – 12 Concertino per camera for Violin and Cello, Op. 4, published in Bologna
- Giovanni Buonaventura Viviani – Salmi, Mottetti e Litanie della B. V. a 1. 2. 3. voci
- Johann Jakob Walther – Hortulus chelicus

== Opera ==
- Marc-Antoine Charpentier – David et Jonathas
- Johann Philipp Förtsch – Die heilige Eugenia
- Jean-Louis Lully – Zephire et Flore
- Henry Purcell – Dido and Aeneas Z.626
- Philidor André Danican l'aine – Le Mariage de la grosse Cathos

== Births ==
- April 15 – Johann Friedrich Fasch, composer (died 1758)
- October 17 – Domenico Zipoli, composer (died 1726)
- date unknown
  - Zacharias Hildebrandt, organ builder (died 1777)
  - Lorenzo Sornis, violinist

== Deaths ==
- January 8 – Francesco Foggia, composer (b. 1604)
- January 29 – Carlo Pallavicino, Italian composer (b. c. 1630)
- May 14 – Carlo Grossi, composer (born c. 1634)
- November 26 – Philippe Quinault, librettist for many operas of Jean-Baptiste Lully (born 1635)
- date unknown – Anne Chabanceau de La Barre (born c. 1628)
