= Pinchgut Opera =

Australian opera company

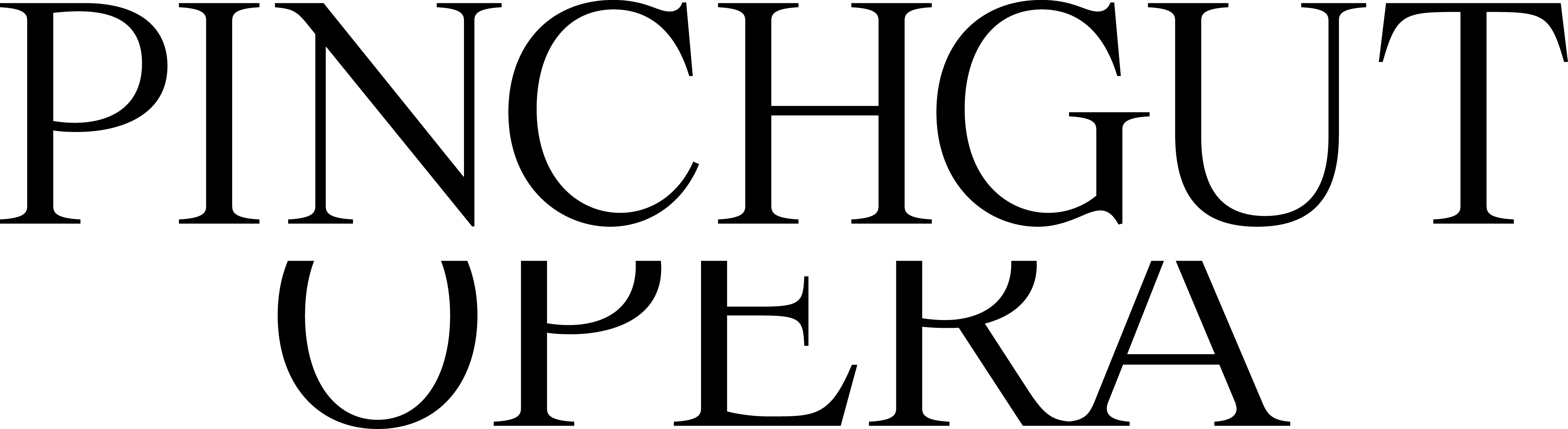

Background information
- Origin: Sydney, Australia
- Genres: 17th and 18th century opera
- Years active: Since December 2002
- Website: www.pinchgutopera.com.au

Pinchgut Opera is a chamber opera company in Sydney, Australia, presenting opera from the 17th and 18th centuries performed on period instruments. Founded in 2002, Pinchgut stages operas and concerts each year in Sydney's. Main performance venues are City Recital Hall and Roslyn Packer Theatre.

== Background ==
The company utilises the professional chamber choir Cantillation as its chorus and has engaged both the Sirius Ensemble and the Orchestra of the Antipodes. Pinchgut draws most of its singers, players, directors and designers from Australia. Its artistic director is Erin Helyard. Antony Walker co-founded the company and conducted the early Pinchgut productions. Past productions were recorded by Greenside Productions and Mano Musica and are released on CD under the "Pinchgut Live" label.

Pinchgut Opera draws its unusual name from Fort Denison, a former penal site in Sydney Harbour which was nicknamed "Pinchgut" by its inmates. According to its website, the company chose the name "as we wanted something recognisably Sydney, easy to remember and as a reminder of our tight budgets and humble beginnings".

The company established in 2021 the Taryn Fiebig Scholarship Program for emerging Australian opera singers in honour of Taryn Fiebig (1972–2021), a leading exponent of 17th and 18th century opera.

The company makes their filmed productions available for free streaming on their Youtube channel. This platform was made free-of-charge in November 2025 after moving their Pinchgut At Home streaming service to Youtube.

== Productions ==
- 2002: Semele by George Frideric Handel (1743)
- 2003:The Fairy-Queen by Henry Purcell (1692)
- 2004: L'Orfeo by Claudio Monteverdi (1607)
- 2005: Dardanus by Jean-Philippe Rameau (1739) – Australian première
- 2006: Idomeneo by Wolfgang Amadeus Mozart (1781)
- 2007: Juditha triumphans, RV 644, by Antonio Vivaldi (1716)
  A staged production of Vivaldi's oratorio was directed by Mark Gaal and designed by Hamish Peters. Mezzo-soprano Sally-Anne Russell sang the title role, alongside Sara Macliver (Abra), David Walker (Holofernes), Fiona Campbell (Vagaus) and Renae Martin (Ozias). The Orchestra of the Antipodes was conducted from the harpsichord by Attilio Cremonesi; Cantillation was the chorus.
- 2008: David et Jonathas H.490 by Marc-Antoine Charpentier (1688)
  Soloists included Swedish tenor Anders J. Dahlin, soprano Sara Macliver, basses Dean Robinson, Richard Anderson and David Parkin, baritone Simon Lobelson and tenor Paul McMahon. Antony Walker conducted the Orchestra of the Antipodes (playing authentic instruments of the period) with Cantillation as the chorus. This was a fully staged and costumed production directed by American director Chas Rader-Shieber and designed by Australian designers Brad Clark and Alex Sommer. Performances took place in early December at City Recital Hall Angel Place.
- 2009: L'Ormindo by Francesco Cavalli (1649)
  The cast included American countertenor David Walker, who appeared as Holofernes in the company's 2007 Juditha triumphans. In the title role was Australian mezzo-soprano Fiona Campbell as Erisbe, while Opera Australia Principal Artists Taryn Fiebig and Kanen Breen, both made their Pinchgut débuts, as Sicle and Erice respectively. Erin Helyard conducted, and the director was Talya Masel. L'Ormindo opened at Sydney's City Recital Hall on 2 December 2009.
- 2010: L'anima del filosofo by Joseph Haydn (1791)
- 2011: Griselda by Antonio Vivaldi (1735)
- 2012: On 30 September, Pinchgut Opera performed works by Blavet, Rameau, Leclair, Lully, Mondonville and Handel in the Old Courts of the Art Gallery of New South Wales. The musicians in this concert were Celeste Lazarenko (soprano), Melissa Farrow (transverse flute), Anna McMichael (violin), Anthea Cottee (viola da gamba), and Erin Helyard (harpsichordist and director). The staged production of Castor et Pollux (1754) by Jean-Philippe Rameau followed later that year.
- 2013: Giasone by Francesco Cavalli (1644)
- 2014: Der Rauchfangkehrer (1781) by Antonio Salieri was presented in English as The Chimney Sweep. This was the first performance of this work in Australia and Pinchgut's first mid-year production, and Christoph Willibald Gluck's Iphigénie en Tauride (1779) following in December 2014, the 300th anniversary of Gluck's birth, with Caitlin Hulcup in the title role.
- 2015: Bajazet (1735) by Antonio Vivaldi in July 2015. This was the first performance of the work in Australia. The second opera was L'amant jaloux (1778) by André Grétry in December.
- 2016: Armida (1784) by Joseph Haydn in July 2016, followed by Theodora by G. F. Handel in December 2016.
- 2017: Triple bill of Anacreon (1754) by Rameau, Pigmalion (1748) by Rameau and Erighetta e Don Chilone by Vinci in June 2017, followed by L'incoronazione di Poppea (Monteverdi) in November–December 2017.
- 2018: Athalia (1733) by Handel and Artasere (1730) by Hasse, and a concert in Melbourne featuring Vivica Genaux.
- 2019: The Return of Ulysses by Claudio Monteverdi (1639–40) and Farnace by Antonio Vivaldi (1727), and a concert in Sydney featuring Valer Sabadus.
- 2020: Médée H.491 by Marc-Antoine Charpentier and Rinaldo by G. F. Handel; and two concerts, the first Splendour of Venice and the second Purcell and Charpentier.
- 2021: Platée (1745) by Rameau, conducted by Erin Helyard and directed by Neil Armfield, with Kanen Breen in the title role, Cheryl Barker as Juno and her husband, Peter Coleman-Wright, as Jupiter – Australian première
- 2022: Orontea (1656) by Antonio Cesti, Australian premiere
- 2023: Membra Jesu Nostri (1680) by Dieterich Buxtehude; Giustino (1683) by Giovanni Legrenzi, Australian premiere; Rinaldo by G. F. Handel
- 2024: Theodora in Concert (1750) by G. F. Handel, in partnership with Opera Australia
- 2024: Dido and Aeneas (1689) by Henry Purcell
- 2024: Eternal Light Allegri, Schmelzer, Biber – A celebration of Allegri's Miserere
- 2024: Giulio Cesare (1724) by George Frideric Handel conducted by Erin Helyard, directed by Neil Armfield, staged at City Recital Hall, Sydney - artists include: countertenor Tim Mead, soprano Samantha Clarke and countertenor Hugh Cutting.
- 2025: Goldberg Variations by J. S. Bach performed by Erin Helyard
- 2025: The Fairy Queen (1692) by Henry Purcell staged at Roslyn Packer Theatre, Walsh Bay - Directed by Netia Jones.
- 2025: Maid Made Boss (La serva padrona) by Giovanni Pergolesi featuring by Celeste Lazarenko, Morgan Pearse, and Gareth Davies, Orchestra of the Antipodes, conducted by Erin Helyard. staged at City Recital Hall, Sydney
- 2025 Messiah Original Dublin Version 1742, by George Frideric Handel performed at City Recital Hall featuring 12 Singers and Orchestra of the Antipodes.
- 2026 Goldberg Variations by J. S. Bach performed by Erin Helyard Melbourne Recital Centre
- 2026 Concertos & Sonatas:Bach & Telemann I by J. S. Bach and Georg Philipp Telemann Orchestra of the Antipodes, conducted by Erin Helyard
- 2026 Il primo omicidio (The First Murder) (1707) by Alessandro Scarlatti staged at Roslyn Packer Theatre directed by Dean Bryant.
- 2026 Coffee and a Dead Canary:Bach & Telemann II by J. S. Bach and Georg Philipp Telemann Orchestra of the Antipodes with soprano Ariana Ricci, tenor Nicholas Jones and baritone Morgan Pearse- staged at City Recital Hall scheduled
- 2026 Semele by George Frideric Handel conducted by Erin Helyard, directed by directed by Neil Armfield, staged at City Recital Hall, Sydney - scheduled.

== Honours ==
- 2019 International Opera Award for Best Rediscovered Work, for Hasse's Artaserse

=== National Live Music Awards ===
The National Live Music Awards (NLMAs) are a broad recognition of Australia's diverse live industry, celebrating the success of the Australian live scene. The awards commenced in 2016.

Year	Nominee / work	Award	Result
National Live Music Awards of 2019	Pinchgut Opera	Live Classical Act of the Year	Nominated
