= Sally-Anne Russell =

Australian opera singer

Sally-Anne Russell is an Australian opera singer. Russell is a mezzo-soprano and has performed nationally and in the US, Britain and New Zealand.

Together with Sara Macliver, Russell earned nominations for the 2004 and 2005 ARIA Awards for Best Classical Album for their albums Bach Arias and Duets and Baroque Duets.

Russell and Mario Dobernig are co-artistic directors of the Albury Chamber Music Festival, and is also a member of the Kathaumixw Festival International Artistic Council in Powell River, British Columbia, Canada, and the Belvedere International Singing Competition, Vienna.

== Discography ==
=== Albums ===
List of albums, with selected details and chart positions
Title	Details	Peak chart positions
Title	Details	AUS
Bach Arias and Duets (with Sara Macliver)	Released: 2003; Format: CD; Label: ABC Classics	88
Baroque Duets (with Sara Macliver)	Released: July 2005; Format: CD; Label: ABC Classics	—
1000 Years of Classical Music, Vol. 11: Baroque & Before – Pergolesi: Stabat mater	Released: 2016; Format: CD; Label: ABC Classics	—

== Awards and nominations ==
=== ARIA Music Awards ===
The ARIA Music Awards is an annual awards ceremony that recognises excellence, innovation, and achievement across all genres of Australian music. They commenced in 1987.

Year	Nominee / work	Award	Result	Ref.
2004	Bach Arias and Duets (with Sara Macliver)	Best Classical Album	Nominated	
2005	Baroque Duets (with Sara Macliver)	Best Classical Album	Nominated	
