= City Recital Hall =

Concert venue in Sydney, Australia

Coordinates: 33.867028°S 151.207865°E

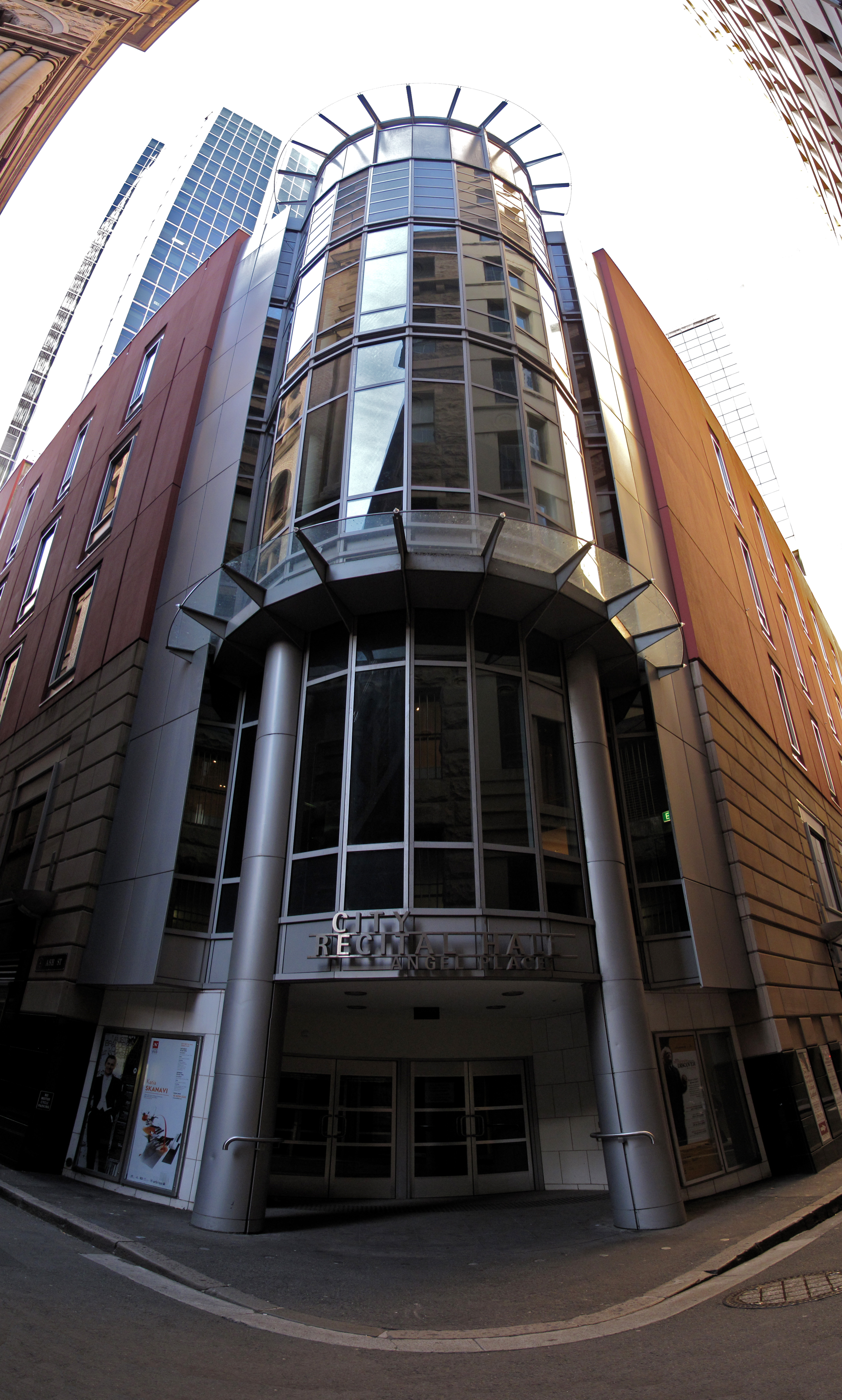
- City Recital Hall
- Interactive map of City Recital Hall
- Address: 2 Angel Place; Sydney NSW 2000
- Location: Sydney, Australia
- Owner: City of Sydney
- Operator: City Recital Hall Limited
- Capacity: 1,238 seated capacity
- Public transit: Wynyard station Martin Place station

Construction
- Built: 1998–1999
- Opened: 1999
- Renovated: 2023–2024
- Architects: Peddle Thorp & Walker Architects (1999)

Website
- www.cityrecitalhall.com

The inside of the venue

City Recital Hall in Sydney, Australia, is a purpose-built concert venue with the capacity for an audience of 1,238 people seated over three tiers of sloped seating. It is situated in the city centre in Angel Place, nearby Martin Place. The architect was Peddle Thorp & Walker Architects and acoustic consultant was Arup Acoustics.

== History ==
City Recital Hall, opened in 1999, is the first specially designed concert venue to be built in the city since the Opera House in 1973.

The venue was initiated by the City of Sydney and was specifically designed for solo recitals, chamber music and the spoken word. The auditorium's 1.8-second reverberation time is attuned for chamber music. The spoken word and amplified music are accommodated by the operation of specially designed acoustic banners. The entire auditorium is supported on rubber bearings to avoid vibration and street sounds and the air conditioning and lighting systems have been treated to minimise external noise.

The Hall was designed in a shoebox shape, based on the classical configuration of 19th-century European concert halls. The design includes gently sloping stalls and two galleries that wrap around both sides and rear of the auditorium. The décor is of grey, gold leaf, light timber panelling and plum-coloured upholstery. The main grand stairway is white marble.

Since 2023, City Recital Hall has been undergoing a Capital Renewal Project in partnership with the City of Sydney. The renovations encompass the four foyers, including the four bars and cloakroom, the lower ground bathrooms, the dressing and green rooms, and the orchestra room. In addition, the venue's audio system has been upgraded to enable 360-degree spatial sound on all three levels, with the aim of further establishing a place in Sydney's contemporary music scene to complement classical offerings. Since June 2023, partially as a result of renovations, City Recital Hall began offering standing general admission concerts.

== Notable events and performances ==
City Recital Hall has hosted the following companies:

- Australian Brandenburg Orchestra
- Australian Chamber Orchestra
- Australian String Quartet
- Gondwana Voices
- Musica Viva Australia
- Pinchgut Opera
- Selby & Friends
- Sydney Children's Choir
- Sydney Festival
- Sydney Philharmonia Choirs
- Sydney Symphony Orchestra
- Sydney Writers' Festival

A list of some of the more famous musical acts that have performed at City Recital Hall include:

Band name	Genre	Country	Year/s Played
Bon Iver	Indie folk	United States	2009
Sara Bareilles	Pop	United States	2014
The Milk Carton Kids	Indie folk	United States	2015, 2023
Middle Kids	Alternative / Indie rock	Australia	2021
Julia Jacklin	Indie pop	Australia	2022
Paul Kelly & Paul Grabowsky	Australian rock / Folk & Jazz	Australia	2022
Aldous Harding	Indie folk	New Zealand	2022
Peaches	Electroclash / Punk rock	Canada	2023
Femi Kuti	Afrobeats	Nigeria / United Kingdom	2023
Ichiko Aoba	Folk	Japan	2023
Cerrone	Disco / Electronic	France	2023
The Pharcyde	Alternative hip hop	United States	2023
Obongjayar	Afrobeat	Nigeria / United Kingdom	2023
Oneohtrix Point Never	Electronic / Experimental	United States	2023
Autechre	Electronic	United Kingdom	2023
Ezra Collective	Jazz / Afrobeat	United Kingdom	2023
Theo Parrish	Deep house	United States	2023
Courtney Barnett	Indie rock / Alternative rock	Australia	2024
Yothu Yindi	Rock / Indigenous music of Australia	Australia	2024
Marlon Williams	Alt-country / Folk	New Zealand	2024

== See also ==
- List of concert halls
- Forgotten Songs (artwork)
