= David et Jonathas =

1688 opera by Marc-Antoine Charpentier

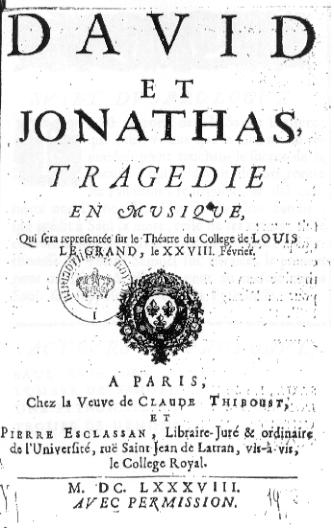
1688 publication

David et Jonathas (David and Jonathan), H.490, is an opera in five acts and a prologue by the French composer Marc-Antoine Charpentier, first performed at the Collège Louis-le-Grand, Paris, on 28 February 1688. The libretto, by Father François Bretonneau, is based on the Old Testament story of the friendship between David and Jonathan.

Although the opera takes the form of a typical French tragédie en musique it has also been referred to as a tragédie biblique because of its Biblical subject matter. David et Jonathas was first performed at a Jesuit college in combination with a spoken drama in Latin, Saul, by Father Étienne Chamillard (1656–1730). Each act of the opera was followed by one act from the play.

Charpentier's work was so successful, it was reprised at other Jesuit colleges in 1706, 1715 and 1741. The opera received its American premiere in Baltimore in 2005. Pinchgut Opera performed the Australian premiere in 2008; a recording was released on ABC Classics. A staging at the Aix-en-Provence Festival, France, with William Christie as musical director, was filmed in 2012. In 2022, a new production directed by Marshall Pynkoski and choreographed by Jeannette Lajeunesse Zingg (with costumes created by Christian Lacroix) was staged at the Château de Versailles, France with Gaëtan Jarry as musical director.

== Roles ==
Roles, voice types
Role	Voice type
Jonathas	boy soprano
David	haute-contre
Une Pythonisse (Witch of Endor)	haute-contre
Joadab (Note: Called "Joabel" in some productions)	tenor
Saül	baritone
Achis	bass
L'Ombre de Samuel ("Shade of Samuel")	bass

== Synopsis ==
Prologue
Saul, King of Israel, visits the "Pythoness" (the Witch of Endor in the Bible) in disguise to learn the outcome of his forthcoming battle against the Philistines. The Pythoness raises the ghost of the prophet Samuel, who predicts that Saul will lose everything: his children, his friends and his crown.

Act 1
David has been banished by the jealous Saul and has taken refuge with the Philistines. He returns to the Philistine camp from a victory. A chorus of warriors, shepherds and captives he has freed sing his praises. David only wishes that, whatever may come, his beloved Jonathan (Saul's son) should be spared. The Philistine king tells David that a truce has been arranged between the Philistines and Saul to discuss whether there shall be peace or war.

Act 2
During the truce, David and Jonathan seek each other out. The Israelite general Joabel is jealous of David and challenges him to single combat, which David refuses. Joabel plots against him and decides to tell Saul that the proposed peace is merely a trick by David.

Act 3
Joabel easily persuades the jealous Saul that David is plotting his downfall. Saul accuses David of treason and he is forced to leave.

Act 4
Saul decides to fight the Philistines and destroy David. The two armies, stirred up by Joabel, are also eager for war. David reluctantly parts from Jonathan, promising he will do all he can to save him and his father.

Act 5
The battle is fought and Saul loses. Jonathan is mortally wounded and dies in David's arms. Saul falls on his own sword to evade capture. Achis tells David he is the new king of the Israelites but this is little consolation in his grief for Jonathan.

== Recordings ==
- 1982: Paul Esswood (David), Colette Alliot-Lugaz (Jonathas), Philippe Huttenlocher (Saül), René Jacobs (La Pythonisse), Roger Soyer (Achis), Opéra National de Lyon Chorus, English Bach Festival Baroque Orchestra, Maitrise de l'Opéra de Lyon, conducted by Michel Corboz (2 CD Erato, report 2010)
- 1988: Gérard Lesne (David), Monique Zanetti (Jonathas), Jean-François Gardeil (Saül), Dominique Visse (La Pythonisse), Bernard Deletré (Achis), Les Arts Florissants, conducted by William Christie (2 CD Harmonia Mundi, report 2012)
- 2009: Anders J. Dahlin (David), Sara Macliver (Jonathan), Dean Robinson (Saul), Paul Mcmahon (La Pythonisse), Richard Anderson (Achis), David Parkin (Ghost of Samuel), Simon Lobelson (Joabel); Pinchgut Opera, Orchestra of the Antipodes & Cantillation conducted by Antony Walker, (2 CD ABC Classics, cat. 4763691)
- 2012: (directed by Andreas Homoki), Pascal Charbonneau (David), Ana Quintans (Jonathas), Neal Davies (Saül), Dominique Visse (la Pythonisse), Frédéric Caton (Achis), Krešimir Špicer (Joabel), Les Arts Florissants, conducted by William Christie, (1 DVD Bel Air classiques, Aix-en-Provence Festival). ffff Télérama, International Opera awards 2014
- 2022: (directed by Marshall Pynkoski), Reinoud van Mechelen (David), Caroline Arnaud, (Jonathas) David Witczak (Saül), Francois-Olivier Jean (La Pythonise), Ensemble Marguerite Louise (Chorus & Orchestra), conducted by Gaëtan Jarry. 1 DVD, 1 Blu-ray and 2 CD CVS (Chateau de Versailles Spectacles, 2023). Diamant Opéra Magazine, 5 Diapasons, Preis der Deutschen Shallplattenkritik...
- 2024: (conducted by Olivier Schneebeli), Clément Debieuvre (David), Natacha Boucher (Jonathan), David Witczak (Saül), Jean-François Lombard (La Pythonisse), Les Pages et les Chantres du Centre de Musique Baroque de Versailles, Les Temps présents. 2 CD Aparte
