= Erin Helyard =

Australian conductor and keyboard performer

Erin Helyard is an Australian conductor and keyboard performer specialising in early music and baroque opera. He was born in Gosford, on the Central Coast near Sydney.

== Career ==
Helyard graduated from the Sydney Conservatorium and was awarded a University Medal. He studied with Tom Beghin at McGill University in Canada for a masters in fortepiano performance. He has a PhD in musicology.

Helyard is artistic director of Pinchgut Opera, which he co-founded. He conducted Barrie Kosky's production of Handel's Saul for the Adelaide Festival in 2017. At the 2020 ARIA Music Awards he won Best Classical Album for Beethoven & Mozart Violin Sonatas (shared with Richard Tognetti).

His 2022 monograph, Clementi and the Woman at the Piano, investigates the relation between the London-based Italian composer Muzio Clementi and piano performance practice by women.

== Awards and nominations ==
The ARIA Music Awards are presented annually from 1987 by the Australian Recording Industry Association (ARIA).

Year	Nominee / work	Award	Result	Ref.
2020	Beethoven & Mozart Violin Sonatas (with Richard Tognetti)	Best Classical Album	Won	
2020	Schubert: Die schöne Müllerin (with baritone David Greco)	Best Classical Album	Nominated	
