= Sara Macliver =

Australian soprano

- Born: 1969; Perth, Western Australia, Australia
- Genre: Opera
- Occupation: Soprano singer

Sara Macliver is an Australian soprano singer, born and raised in Perth, Western Australia. Macliver has appeared in operas, concert and recital performances and on recordings. She specialises in Baroque music, and lectures in Voice at the UWA Conservatorium of Music.

== Career ==
She trained in Perth, where she was a pupil of Molly McGurk and was a Young Artist with the West Australian Opera Company. Her roles for the company have included Micaela (Carmen), Papagena (The Magic Flute), Giannetta (L'elisir d'amore), Morgana (Alcina), Ida (Die Fledermaus), Nannetta (Falstaff) and Vespetta (Pimpinone). In 2007, she created the roles of Echo/Aphrodite in Richard Mills' opera The Love of the Nightingale. She sang Susanna in The Marriage of Figaro with the company in 2009.

=== Performances ===
Macliver regularly performs with Symphony Australia Orchestras, Musica Viva, Melbourne Chorale, the Australian Chamber Orchestra, the Australia Bach Ensemble and Sydney Philharmonia Choirs. She has a particular association with the Australian Brandenburg Orchestra, with whom she recorded her first CD, If Love’s a Sweet Passion.

She has performed in Japan, Italy, New Zealand and Hong Kong. She has performed with Pinchgut Opera in The Fairy-Queen, toured with Musica Viva, Australia Bach Ensemble and worked with Richard Egarr on Joseph Haydn's The Creation in Perth. Other projects include a program based on the life of Jane Austen, with pianist Bernadette Balkus and Musica Viva. She also appeared in Pinchgut Opera's production of Monteverdi's L'Orfeo.

=== Recordings ===
Macliver has made a number of recordings for ABC Classics including Gabriel Fauré's Requiem and The Birth of Venus, Carl Orff's Carmina Burana, the title track for a trilogy of Christmas albums and a CD of Haydn arias with the Tasmanian Symphony Orchestra conducted by Ola Rudner. In 2002, she completed a recording of Handel's Messiah for a joint ABC Classics and ABC Television production. ABC Classics have released a disc of Bach arias and duets with Sara Macliver and mezzo-soprano Sally-Anne Russell and the Orchestra of the Antipodes conducted by Antony Walker. This was followed by a disc of the Pergolesi Stabat Mater (ABC Classics) and other baroque duets. She also appeared in Pinchgut Opera's production of Charpentier's David et Jonathas H.490 in 2009.

== Education ==
She has received an Honorary Doctorate of Music from the University of Western Australia, in whose School of Music she completed her undergraduate studies.

== Personal life ==
Although resident for some years in Sydney, she has now returned to Perth.

== Selected recordings ==
List of albums, with selected details and chart positions
Title	Details	Peak chart positions
Title	Details	AUS
Bach Arias and Duets (with Sally-Anne Russell)	Released: 2003; Format: CD; Label: ABC Classics	88
Baroque Duets (with Sally-Anne Russell)	Released: July 2005; Format: CD; Label: ABC Classics	—

- Marc-Antoine Charpentier: David + Jonathan H.490, Anders J. Dahlin (David), Sara Macliver (Jonathan), Dean Robinson (Saul), Paul Mcmahon (La Pythonisse), Richard Anderson (Achis), David Parkin (Ghost of Samuel), Simon Lobelson (Joabel); Pinchgut Opera, Orchestra of the Antipodes & Cantillation conducted by Antony Walker, (2 CD ABC Classics, cat. 4763691) 2009.

== Awards and nominations ==
=== ARIA Music Awards ===
The ARIA Music Awards is an annual awards ceremony that recognises excellence, innovation, and achievement across all genres of Australian music.

Year	Nominee / work	Award	Result	Ref.
1999	If Love's a Sweet Passion (with Australian Brandenburg Orchestra & Paul Dyer)	Best Classical Album	Nominated	
2004	Bach Arias and Duets (with Sally-Anne Russell)	Best Classical Album	Nominated	
2005	Baroque Duets (with Sally-Anne Russell)	Best Classical Album	Nominated	
