= List of compositions by Salvatore Sciarrino =

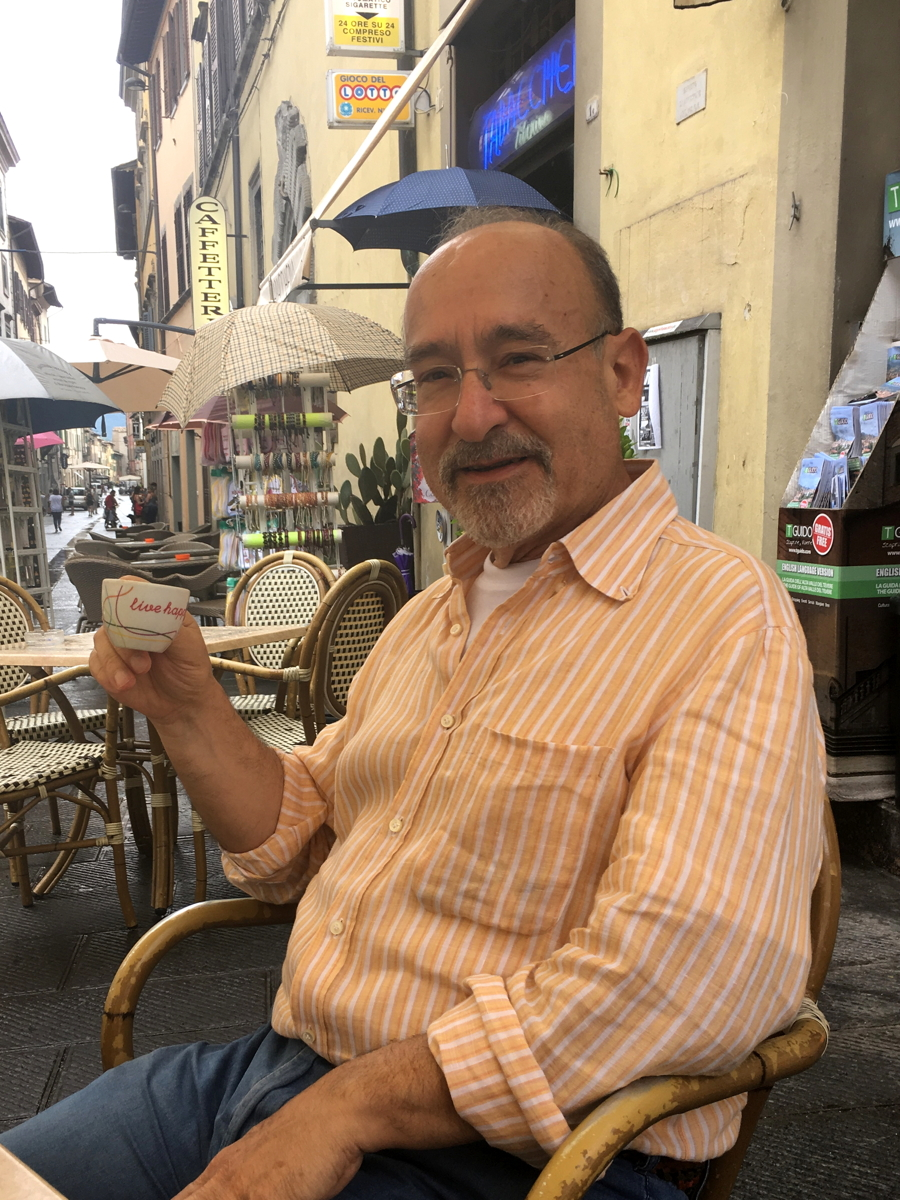
Salvatore Sciarrino

The following is a list of compositions by Salvatore Sciarrino.

== Works by genre ==
=== Stage works ===
- Amore e Psiche (1973)
- Aspern (1979)
- Cailles en sarcophage. Atti per un museo delle ossessioni (1979–1980)
- Vanitas. Natura morta in un atto (1981)
- Lohengrin. Azione invisibile per solista (1982–1984)
- La perfezione di uno spirito sottile (1985)
- Perseo e Andromeda (1990)
- Luci mie traditrici (1996–1998)
- Infinito nero. Estasi in un atto (1998)
- Morte a Venezia. Studi sullo spessore lineare (1991)
- Macbeth. Tre atti senza nome (2002)
- Lohengrin 2. Disegno per un giardino sonoro (2004)
- Da gelo a gelo (Kälte) (2006)
- La porta della legge - quasi un monologo circolare (2006–2008)
- Superflumina (2010)

=== Symphonic works ===
- Berceuse (1969)
- Da a da da (1970)
- Introduzione e Aria "Ancora il duplice" (1971)
- Grande Sonata da camera (1972)
- Rondo (1972)
- Romanza (1973)
- Variazioni (1974)
- Clair de lune (1976)
- Il paese senz'alba (1977)
- Il paese senza tramonto (1977)
- Berceuse variata (1977)
- Kindertotenlied (1978)
- Musiche per "All'uscita" (1978)
- Che sai, guardiano della notte? (1979)
- Un'immagine di Arpocrate (1979)
- Flos florum (1981)
- Efebo con radio (1981)
- Autoritratto nella notte (1982)
- Allegoria della notte (1985)
- Sui poemi concentrici I, II, III (1987)
- Morte di Borromini (1988)
- Gioachino Rossini: Giovanna d'Arco (1989. Orchestration of an original Rossini composition, a cantata written in 1832 with piano accompaniment)
- Lettura da lontano (1989)
- Nove Canzoni del XX secolo (1991)
- Cadenzario (1991)
- Frammento e Adagio (1992)
- Musiche per il "Paradiso" di Dante (1993)
- Mozart a 9 anni (1993)
- Soffio e forma (1995)
- L'immaginazione a se stessa (1996)
- Il cerchio tagliato dei suoni (1997)
- I fuochi oltre la ragione (1997)
- La bocca, i piedi, il suono (1997)
- Quattro intermezzi (1997)
- Sophisticated Lady (1999)
- Recitativo oscuro (1999)
- Studi per l'intonazione del mare (2000)
- Il clima dopo Harry Partch (2000)
- Il giornale della necropoli (2000)
- Altre schegge di canto (2002)
- Graffito sul mare (2003)
- Il suono e il tacere (2004)
- Storie di altre storie (2005)
- Shadow of sound (2005)
- 4 Adagi (2007)
- Libro notturno delle voci (2009)
- Senza sale d'aspetto (2011)

=== Choral music and music for vocal ensembles ===
- Musiche per "Orlando furioso" (1969)
- Musiche per "I bei colloqui" (1970)
- Musiche per "Le Trachinie" (1980)
- Le donne di Trachis (1980)
- Tutti i miraggi delle acque (1987)
- L'alibi della parola (1994)
- 3 Canti senza pietre (1999)
- Responsorio delle tenebre (2001)
- 12 Madrigali (2007)

=== Chamber music ===
- Sonata per due pianoforti (1966)
- II Quartetto (1967)
- Aka aka to I, II, III (1968)
- 6 Ricercari di Antonio il Verso (1969)
- 2 Mottetti di Anonimi (1969)
- ... da un Divertimento (1970)
- In memoriam (1970)
- Arabesque (1971)
- Sonata da camera (1971)
- Sonatina per violino e pianoforte (1975)
- Danse for 2 violins and viola (1975)
- Siciliano (1975)
- Trio (1975)
- Di Zefiro e Pan (1976)
- Quintettino n. 1 (1976)
- Quintettino n. 2 (1977)
- 12 canzoni da battello (1977)
- Canzona da battello (1977)
- Attraverso i cancelli (1977)
- Due melodie (1978)
- Aspern Suite (1979)
- D'un faune (1980)
- Fauno che fischia a un merlo (1980)
- La malinconia for violin and viola (1980)
- 5 scene da Cailles en sarcophage (1980)
- Blue Dream (1980)
- Introduzione all'oscuro (1981)
- Canto degli specchi (1981)
- Vanitas (1981)
- Melencolia I (1982)
- Due nuove melodie (1982)
- Nox apud Orpheum (1982)
- Codex purpureus (1983)
- Tre canzoni del XX secolo (1984)
- Raffigurar Narciso al fonte (1984)
- Codex purpureus II (1984)
- Centauro marino for clarinet, violin, viola, cello and piano (1984)
- Guillaume de Machaut: "Rose Liz" (1984)
- Il tempo con l'obelisco (1985)
- La navigazione notturna (1985)
- Lo spazio inverso (1985)
- La perfezione di uno spirito sottile (1985)
- Esplorazione del bianco II (1986)
- Le ragioni delle conchiglie (1986)
- Trio n. 2 (1987)
- Il motivo degli oggetti di vetro (1987)
- Brazil (L'épigraphe phénicienne du) (1988)
- Il silenzio degli oracoli (1989)
- Sei quartetti brevi (1992)
- W. A. Mozart: Adagio (1994)
- Medioevo presente (1994)
- Nuvolario (1995)
- Omaggio a Burri (1995)
- Muro d'orizzonte (1997)
- Due risvegli e il vento (1997)
- Waiting for the wind (1998)
- Le voci sottovetro (1998)
- Pagine (1998)
- Canzoniere da Scarlatti (1998)
- Cantare con silenzio (1999)
- Quartetto n. 7 (1999)
- Un fruscìo lungo trent'anni (1999)
- Esercizi di tre stili (2000)
- 2 Arie notturne dal campo (2001)
- In nomine nominis (2001)
- La perfidia (2002)
- Cavatina e i gridi (2002)
- Allegro KV 15 (2003)
- Due smarrimenti (2003)
- Sestetto (2003)
- Quaderno di strada (2003)
- Scena di vento (2004)
- Il legno e la parola (2004)
- Vento d'ombra (2005)
- Archeologia del telefono (2005)
- Tre duetti con l'eco (2006)
- Dita unite a quattro mani (2006)
- Le stagioni artificiali (2006)
- 12 Madrigali (2007)
- Quartetto n. 8 (2008)
- Il giardino di Sara (2008)
- Adagio (2009)
- L'altro giardino (2009)
- Adagio di Mozart (2010)
- Fanofania (2010)
- Cantiere del poema (2011)
- Ombre nel mattino di Piero (Quartetto n. 9) (2012)

=== Music for a solo instrument ===
- Minifuga (1965)
- Prélude pour le piano (1969)
- De o de do [harpsichord](1970)
- De la nuit [piano] (1971)
- Esercizio [piano] (1972)
- Due Studi (1974)
- Tre notturni brillanti for viola solo (1974)
- Per Mattia [violin] (1975)
- Toccata [flute?] (1975)
- Etude de concert [piano] (1976)
- Sei Capricci [violin] (1976)
- I Sonata per pianoforte (1976)
- All'aure in una lontananza [flute] (1977)
- Ai limiti della notte for viola (or cello) solo (1979)
- L'addio a Trachis [harp] (1980)
- Anamorfosi [piano] (1980)
- Cadenze e fermate (Mozart - pianoforte) (1982)
- Let me die before I wake [clarinet] (1982)
- II Sonata per pianoforte [piano] (1983)
- Morgana (1983)
- Hermes [flute] (1984)
- Come vengono prodotti gli incantesimi? [flute] (1985)
- Canzona di ringraziamento [flute] (1985)
- Esplorazione del bianco I [double bass] (1986)
- Appendice alla perfezione [percussion] (1986)
- Esplorazione del bianco III (1986)
- III Sonata per pianoforte (1987)
- L'addio a Trachis II [harp] (1987)
- Cadenze (Mozart - violino) (1989)
- Cadenze e fermate (Mozart - flauto e oboe) (1989)
- Venere che le Grazie la fioriscono [flute] (1989)
- L'orizzonte luminoso di Aton [flute] (1989)
- Fra i testi dedicati alle nubi [flute] (1989)
- Variazione su uno spazio ricurvo [piano] (1990)
- Fermate e fioriture (1990)
- Perduto in una città d'acque [piano] (1991)
- Cadenze (Mozart - pianoforte) (1991)
- IV Sonata per pianoforte (1992)
- Fermata e Cadenza (Boccherini) (1993)
- Johann Sebastian Bach: Toccata e fuga in re minore (1993)
- Addio case del vento [flute] (1993)
- V Sonata con 5 finali diversi (1994)
- Polveri laterali [piano] (1997)
- Vagabonde blu [accordion] (1998)
- Notturno n. 3 [piano] (1998)
- 2 Notturni per pianoforte [piano] (1998)
- Notturno n. 4 [piano] (1998)
- L'orologio di Bergson [flute] (1999)
- Morte tamburo [flute] (1999)
- Immagine fenicia [flute] (2000)
- Lettera degli antipodi portata dal vento [flute] (2000)
- Due notturni crudeli [piano] (2001)
- Capriccio di una corda [violin] (2009)
- Fra sé [violin] (2009)

=== Cadenzas, fiorituras, re-elaborations ===
- Blue Dream (1980)
- Cadenze e fermate (Mozart - pianoforte) (1982)
- Brazil (L'épigraphe phénicienne du) (1988)
- Cadenze (Mozart - violino) (1989)
- Cadenze e fermate (Mozart - flauto e oboe) (1989)
- Gioachino Rossini: Giovanna d'Arco (1989)
- Fermate e fioriture (1990)
- Morte a Venezia (1991)
- Nove Canzoni del XX secolo (1991)
- Cadenze (Mozart - pianoforte) (1991)
- Cadenzario (1991)
- Fermata e Cadenza (Boccherini) (1993)
- Johann Sebastian Bach, Toccata e fuga in re minore (1993)
- Mozart a 9 anni (1993)
- W. A. Mozart, Adagio (1994)
- Medioevo presente (1994)
- Le voci sottovetro (1998)
- Canzoniere da Scarlatti (1998)
- Sophisticated Lady (1999)
- Esercizi di tre stili (2000)
- 2 Arie notturne dal campo (2001)
- Allegro KV 15 (2003)
- Adagio (2009)
- Adagio di Mozart (2010)

=== Music for the stage and music for radio broadcasts ===
- Musiche per Orlando furioso (1969)
- Musiche per I bei colloqui (1970)
- Musiche per All'uscita (1978)
- Musiche per Le Trachinie (1980)
- Musiche per Lectura Dantis (1981)
- La voce dell'Inferno (1981)
- Prologo in terra (1985)
- Musiche per La Divina Commedia (1988)
- Musiche per il Paradiso di Dante (1993)
- Terribile e spaventosa storia… (1999)

=== Electronic music ===
- Musiche per I bei colloqui (1970)
- Implicor (1971)
- La voce dell'Inferno (1981)
- Due Arie marine (1990)
- Nom des Airs (1994)
- Lohengrin 2 (2004)
