= Giovanni Legrenzi =

Italian composer (1626–1690)

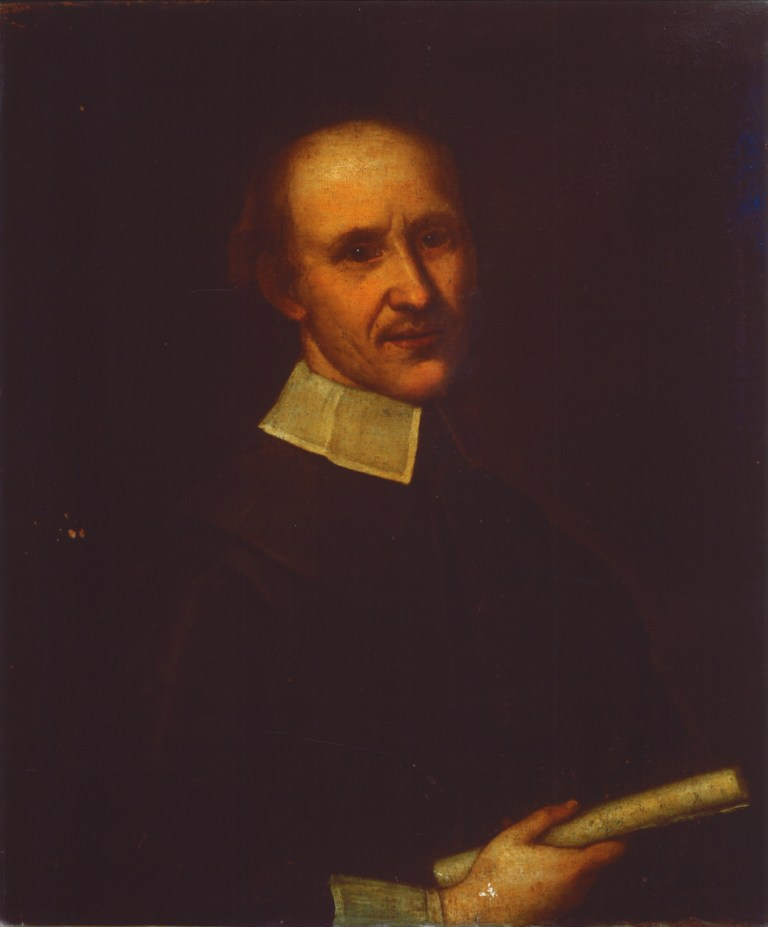
18th-century portrait of Giovanni Legrenzi by anonymous painter, Civico museo bibliografico musicale, Bologna

Giovanni Legrenzi (baptized August 12, 1626 – May 27, 1690) was an Italian composer of opera, vocal and instrumental music, and organist, of the Baroque era. He was one of the most prominent composers in Venice in the late 17th century, and extremely influential in the development of late Baroque idioms across northern Italy. He was a massive influence on Arcangelo Corelli and Antonio Vivaldi.

== Life ==
Legrenzi was born at Clusone, near Bergamo, then part of the Republic of Venice. His father, Giovanni Maria Legrenzi, was a professional violinist and, to some extent, a composer. We know Legrenzi had two brothers and two sisters, though one of the brothers, Marco, apparently a talented musician who performed with his father and brother in the 1660s, is not mentioned in Legrenzi's will: it is presumed that he died young. His remaining brother and sisters are both mentioned in his will. Legrenzi was probably taught largely at home, and his performance skills developed at the local church, and it can also be assumed there was music-making in the house.

Legrenzi received his first appointment in Bergamo, as Organist at Santa Maria Maggiore, a magnificent church with a celebrated musical history. Following ordination as a priest in 1651, he was appointed as a resident chaplain at the church, though he continued to be actively involved in the music, and was given the title of First Organist in 1653, at about the time Maurizio Cazzati was appointed maestro di cappella. Legrenzi's first publication, music for Mass and Vespers, appeared in 1654. His appointment as organist was not reconfirmed at the end of the year owing to his apparent involvement in a minor gambling scandal, though he was reinstated by mid-February 1655.

Legrenzi resigned from his position at Bergamo towards the end of 1655, and in 1656 became maestro di cappella at the Academy of the Holy Spirit in Ferrara. The academy was not a learned society, but a fraternity of laymen which presented predominantly liturgical services with music. It had a small but very good musical establishment with an impressive tradition, and effectively addressed the needs of the whole aristocratic community of Ferrara, with whom Legrenzi cemented relationships that, like those he had already established in Bergamo, would serve him well throughout his life. The position at the Academy of the Holy Spirit would have left Legrenzi with ample time for other pursuits. By the early 1660s, he had already published eight volumes, and had broken into the elite world of opera, gaining his first performances in Venice in 1664.

We know little of certainty about Legrenzi's activities between approximately 1665 and 1670, a situation considerably exacerbated by the destruction of local records during World War II. He ended his association with the Academy of the Holy Spirit at some point, and does not appear to have had a permanent position of any sort for several years, though it is unlikely that he was in financial difficulty. He had land at Clusone and the proceeds from his publications, several of which had already gone into second editions, as well as performance fees. He also published his largest volume, the huge collection for double choir, during this period.

Legrenzi seems to have been well settled in Venice by 1670. He took a position as a music teacher at Santa Maria dei Derelitti (commonly called the Ospedaletto), remaining until 1676, and was busy with further publications, musical commissions, especially oratorios, occasional performances, and more.

In 1676, he was a finalist for appointment as maestro at San Marco in succession to Francesco Cavalli, losing by a single vote to Natale Monferrato. Later in the year he became maestro di coro of the Ospedale dei Mendicanti, where he remained until 1682, when he succeeded Antonio Sartorio as vice-maestro at San Marco. He was by this time (along with Carlo Pallavicino) the leading opera composer of his day, with ten commissions in the five years to 1685. The singer Antonio Cottini starred in stagings of his Germanico sul Reno (1676) given in Milan and Modena in 1677.

Legrenzi succeeded Monferrato as maestro di cappella at San Marco in April 1685. He was by this time probably in failing health, and the last few years of his life were clouded by sickness. He took little part in the services at San Marco from the later part of 1687, where performances were increasingly in the hands of his vice-maestro, Gian Domenico Partenio. Legrenzi's death on 27 May 1690 from the "mal di petra" (a colic-related illness, probably kidney stones) was accompanied by excruciating pain.

Legrenzi's legacy lived on for some years after his death. His great-nephew Giovanni Varischino inherited his music and books, and produced four posthumous publications.

== Music ==
Legrenzi was active in most of the genres current in northern Italy in the late 17th century, including sacred vocal music, opera, oratorio, and varieties of instrumental music. Though best known as a composer of instrumental sonatas, he was predominantly a composer of liturgical music with a distinctly dramatic character. The bulk of his instrumental music may also be included in this category, since it would have been used primarily as a substitute for liturgical items at Mass or Vespers.

Legrenzi composed nineteen operas from 1662 to 1685, of which the most successful were Achille in Sciro (1664), La divisione del mondo, I due cesari (1683), Il Giustino (1683), and Publio Elio Pertinace (1684). His operas were immensely popular (and extravagantly presented) in their day, though, like his oratorios, few have survived. His later dance music was certainly connected with the operatic repertoire, though the function of an early collection (Op. 4, which is musicologically famous for its inclusion of six pieces designated sonate da camera) is less clear.

Legrenzi's music is steadily gaining interest as scores and transcriptions become more widely available. Early music groups are increasingly including the instrumental sonatas and selections of the devotional and liturgical music in concerts. There have been significant revivals of some of the surviving operas. Editions of La divisione del mondo and Il Giustino by the German conductor Thomas Hengelbrock have had performances at the Schwetzingen Festival, the Innsbruck Festival of Early Music and the Echternach Music Festival, and there was a major revival of La divisione del mondo in a co-production between the Opéra national du Rhin and Opéra national de Lorraine in February/March 2019.

Students of Legrenzei include Antonio Lotti, Francesco Gasparini, Giovanni Varischino, Tomaso Albinoni, and Giovanni Sebenico.

== Published works ==
1. Concerti Musicali per uso di Chiesa. Op. 1 (Venice, Alessandro Vincenti, 1654)
2. Sonata a due, e tre. Op. 2 (Venice, Francesco Magni, 1655)
3. Harmonia d'affetti Devoti a due, tre, e quatro, voci. Op. 3 (Venice, Alessandro Vincenti, 1655)
4. Sonate dà Chiesa, e dà Camera, Correnti, Balletti, Alemane, Sarabande a tre, doi violini, e violone. Libro Secondo. Op. 4 (Venice, Francesco Magni, 1656)
5. Salmi a cinque, tre voci, e due violini. Op. 5 (Venice, Francesco Magni, 1657)
6. Sentimenti Devoti Espressi con le musica di due, e tre voci. Libro Secondo. Op. 6 (Venice, Francesco Magni detto Gardano, 1660). A second edition was published in Antwerp in 1665.
7. Compiete con le Lettanie & Antifone Della B.V. a 5. voci. Op. 7 (Venice, Francesco Magni detto Gardano, 1662)
8. Sonate a due, tre, cinque, a sei stromenti. Libro 3. Op. 8 (Venice, Francesco Magni, 1663)
9. Sacri e Festivi Concerti. Messa e Salmi a due chori con stromenti a beneplacito. Op. 9 (Venice, Francesco Magni Gardano, 1667)
10. Acclamationi Divote a voce sola. Libro Primo. Op. 10 (Bologna, Giacomo Monti, 1670)
11. La Cetra. Libro Quarto di Sonate a due tre e quattro stromenti. Op. 10 (Venice, Francesco Magni Gardano, 1673, reprinted 1682)
12. Cantate, e Canzonette a voce sola. Op. 12 (Bologna, Giacomo Monti, 1676)
13. Idee Armoniche Estese per due e tre voci. Op. 13 (Venice, Francesco Magni detto Gardano, 1678)
14. Echi di Riverenza di Cantate, e Canzoni. Libro Secondo. Op. 14 (Bologna, Giacomo Monti, 1678)
15. Sacri Musicali Concerti a due, e tre voci. Libro Terzo. Op. 15 (Venice, Gioseppe Sala, 1689)
16. Balletti e Correnti a cinque stromenti, con il basso continuo per il cembalo. Libro Quinto Postumo. Op. 16 (Venice, Gioseppe Sala, 1691)
17. Motetti Sacri a voce sola con tre strumenti. Op. 17 (Venice, Gioseppe Sala, 1692)
18. Sonate a 2, 3, 4, 5, 6 e 7 istrumenti con tromba, o senza, overo flauto Op. 18 (Venice, Gioseppe Sala, 1693) (no copy survives)
19. Voci geniali, raccolte in duetti e terzetti Op. 19 (Venice, Gioseppe Sala, 1698) (no copy survives)

Note: Two collections were published as opus 10, Acclamationi Divote (1670) and La Cetra (1673). The printing of La Cetra as Opus 10 appears to be an error on the part of the Venetian publisher, who was presumably unaware of the collection published in Bologna in 1670: the correct numbering of the publications resumed with Opus 12.

== Unpublished works ==
A number of works survive in manuscript copies only. Most can be ascribed confidently to Legrenzi, though there are a few of less certain attribution. Among the most important of these works are:

- The Messa a cinque voci con stromenti, found at Oxford.
- The Missa quinque vocibus found at Loreto. This Mass, dated 1689 and surviving in a magnificently bound volume, may have been presented as a votive offering.
- The Messa a 16 for four choirs and organ continuo held in the Vatican Library.
- The Prosa pro mortuis, a complete setting for double choir and instruments of the sequence "Dies irae" from the Requiem Mass.
- A unique setting for double choir and instruments of Matins for Christmas Day, including the Invitatory, Psalms and Te Deum; and concluding with the Introit for the First Mass of Christmas.
- Intret in conspectu, a motet for 6 voices, known from a single source copied out by Handel, who drew on Legrenzi's motet in the chorus 'To thy dark servant' in the oratorio Samson.
- Credidi propter quod locutus sum, a psalm setting for solo alto, strings and continuo, which appears likely to be a unique example of Legrenzi's own hand, as there is evidence that it is an autograph.
- Laudate pueri, a psalm setting for five voices, strings and continuo and, unusually, a trumpet.
- Spirate aure serenae, a motet for solo soprano, strings and continuo which provides for a theorbo to double or replace the violone.

There are in addition a few more liturgical pieces, a number of cantatas and the unusual 'serenata' Notte, madri d'horrori.

== Operas ==
1. Nino, il giusto (1662)
2. Achille in Sciro (1663)
3. Zenobia e Radamisto † (1665)
4. Tiridate (1668)
5. Eteocle e Polinice † (1674)
6. La divisione del mondo † (1675)
7. Adone in Cipro ‡ (1676)
8. Germanico sul Reno † (1676)
9. Totila † (1677)
10. Antioco il grande ‡ (1681)
11. Creso ‡ (1681)
12. Pausania (1681)
13. Lisimaco riamato da Alessandro ‡ (1682)
14. Ottaviano Cesare Agusto (1682)
15. I due cesari ‡ (1683)
16. Il Giustino † (1683)
17. L'anarchia dell'imperio ‡ (1683)
18. Publio Elio Pertinace ‡ (1684)
19. Ifianassa e Melampo (1685)

† Surviving scores.
‡ Arias from these operas survive in one or more sources.

== Oratorios ==
- Oratorio del giuditio (1665)
- Lamenti Profetici nella Passione di Cristo (1671), a series of three cantatas which functioned as an introduction to the singing of the Miserere at Lauds during Holy Week.
- Sedecia † (1671)
- Il creation del mondo (1672)
- Sisara (1672)
- Moisè (1672)
- La vendita del cuor humano † (or Il prezzo del cuor humano) ‡ (1673)
- La morte del cor penitente † (1673)
- San Giovanni Battista (1673)
- Adamo et Eva (1674)
- Gli sponsali d'Ester (1675)
- Decollatione di S. Giovanni (1678)
- Erodiade (lib. Neri) (1687)
- Erodiade (lib. Piccioli) (1687)

† Surviving scores.
‡ Whether or not La vendita del cuor humano is in fact a Legrenzi work or Pietro Andrea Ziani's Il cuore humano all'incanto remains to be demonstrated.

== Facsimiles ==
- Acclamationi divote a voce sola. Bibliotheca musica Bononiensis. Sezione IV 207 : Bologna, Forni 1980.
- Cantatas by Antonio Cesti and Giovanni Legrenzi; selected and introduced by David Burrows and Stephen Bonta. The Italian cantata in the seventeenth century; vol.6. New York : Garland, 1986. ISBN 0-8240-8880-8. (Nos.1 – 12 from Opus 14, and three manuscript works.)
- Echi di riverenza : di cantate e canzoni. Archivum musicum. Cantata barocca; 7. Firenze : Studio per edizioni scelte, 1980. ISBN 978-88-7242-685-2.
- Il Giustino : melodramma in tre atti. Collezione settecentesca Bettarini; no. 12. Milano : Casa editrice Nazionalmusic, c. 1980.
- La Cetra. Monumenta Lombarda, Libri Antiqui Fototypice Expressi, 2. Bologna, 1970.

King's Music (now distributed through The Early Music Company) produces good quality photocopies of the complete collections Sonate a due, tre, cinque, a sei stromenti (Op. 8, 1663), Idee Armoniche Estese (Op. 13, 1678) and Balletti e Correnti (Op. 16, 1691).

== Editions ==
- Alessandro Bares, Pietro Zazzetta (ed.), La Cetra. Musedita, Albese con Cassano, 2000. (The whole of La Cetra, Opus 11(10).)
- Alessandro Bares (ed.), Sonate a due, e tre. Musedita, Albese con Cassano, 2006. (The whole of Opus 2.)
- Alessandro Bares (ed.), Sonate a due, trè, cinque, e sei Stromenti. Musedita, Albese con Cassano, 2004. (The whole of Opus 8.)
- Stephen Bonta (ed.): The instrumental music of Giovanni Legrenzi : sonate a due e tre, opus 2, 1655. Harvard Publications in Music, 14. Harvard University Press, 1984. ISBN 0-674-45620-3.
- Stephen Bonta (ed.): La Cetra : sonate a due, tre e quattro stromenti, libro quattro, opus 10, 1673. Harvard Publications in Music, 17. Harvard University Press, 1992. ISBN 0-674-45621-1.
- Howard Mayer Brown: Italian opera librettos : 1640–1770. Italian opera, 1640–1770 v. 60. New York : Garland, 1979. ISBN 0-8240-2659-4.
- Howard Mayer Brown: Totila. Italian opera, 1640–1770 v. 9. New York : Garland, 1978. ISBN 0-8240-2608-X.
- Julia de Clerck: Prosa pro mortuis (Dies irae), Musicologica neolovaniensia; musica sacra 1. Louvain-la-Neuve : Institut supérieur d'archéologie et d'histoire de l'art, 1981.
- Stefano Faglia, Franca Saini (ed.): Eteocle e Polinice. Opera in 3 Atti. Venezia 1675. Monza, Accademia Musicale IAMR, 2003. Parma, L'oca del Cairo Edizioni Musicali, 2003.
- Stefano Faglia, Franca Saini (ed.): Il Giustino. Opera in 3 atti. Venezia 1683. Monza, Accademia Musicale IAMR, 2006. Parma, L'oca del Cairo Edizioni Musicali, 2006.
- Stefano Faglia, Franca Saini (ed.): Zenobia e Radamisto. Opera in 3 atti. Ferrara 1665. Monza, Accademia Musicale IAMR, 2013. Lucca, Libreria Musicale Italiana (LIM), 2013.
- Joyce Johnson (ed.): Giovanni Legrenzi 1629–1690 II Sedecia / Bernardo Pasquini 1637–1710 Sant'Agnese. The Italian oratorio, 1650–1800; 8. New York, Garland, 1986. ISBN 0-8240-7707-5.
- Jeffrey Kurtzman (ed.): Vesper and Compline Music for Three Principal Voices. Seventeenth-Century Italian Sacred Music; 13. New York, Garland, 1998. ISBN 0-8153-2360-3. (Confitebor tibi from Opus 1)
- Jeffrey Kurtzman (ed.): Vesper and Compline Music for Four Principal Voices. Seventeenth-Century Italian Sacred Music; 14. New York: Garland, 1998. ISBN 0-8153-2420-0. (Dixit Dominus from Opus 1)
- Jeffrey Kurtzman (ed.): Vesper and Compline Music for Five Principal Voices, Parts I-II. Seventeenth-Century Italian Sacred Music; 15–16. New York: Garland, 1999–2000. ISBN 0-8153-2421-9 (I) ISBN 0-8153-2422-7 (II). (Laudate Dominum from Opus 1, in Volume 16)
- Jeffrey Kurtzman (ed.): Vesper and Compline Music for Eight Principal Voices, Part One-Two. Seventeenth-Century Italian Sacred Music; 18–19. New York: Garland, c.2001–2002. ISBN 0-8153-2424-3 (I) ISBN 0-8153-2425-1 (II). (In exitu Israel from Opus 9, in Volume 19)
- Anne Schnoebelen (ed.): Masses by Maurizio Cazzati, Giovanni Antonio Grossi, Giovanni Legrenzi. Seventeenth-Century Italian Sacred Music; 7. New York : Garland, 1997. ISBN 0-8153-2413-8. (The Mass from Opus 9)
- Albert Seay (ed.): Cantatas and Canzonets for Solo voice, Part I: Music for alto and bass voices; Part II: Music for soprano or tenor voice. Recent Researches in the music of the Baroque era, 14, 15 : Madison, A-R Editions, 1972. (The whole of Opus 12.)
- Albert Seay (ed.): Sonate da camera : opus 4, for two violins and basso continuo, Musica da camera, 55. Oxford University Press, c.1979. (Nos. 7–30 from Opus 4) ISBN 978-0-19-357620-9.
- Albert Seay (ed.): Sonate da chiesa, opus 4 [and] opus 8 (1656–1663). Le Pupitre, collection of ancient music published under the direction of François Lesure, 4. Paris : Heugel, 1968. (Nos. 1–6 from Opus 4; Nos. 7–10 from Opus 8)

Prima la musica! produce Urtext performing editions of chamber and sacred music from several of Legrenzi's printed collections.

King's Music (see "Facsimiles" above) produces facsimile or Brian Clark's Urtext performing editions of a number of individual works. So too do Prima la musica!

== Recordings ==
Major recordings dedicated to Legrenzi include:

- Acclamationi Divote; Echi di Riverenza. Cappella Mauriziana; dir. Mario Valsecchi. Antes BM-CD 91.1016. [Motets from Acclamationi Divote Op. 10 (1670): Angelorum ad convivia, Op. 10/1; Durum cor Op. 10/3; En homo quae pro te Op. 10/9; Plaudite vocibus Op. 10/10; Cantatas from Echi di Riverenza Op. 14 (1678): Catene scioglietimi Op. 14/1; A pie d'un fonte Op. 14/3; A battaglia Op. 14/6.]
- Concerti musicali per uso di Chiesa, Op. 1. Oficina Musicum, direttore Riccardo Favero, Dynamic, CDS 653. [The whole of Op. 1, both Mass and Vespers "of a Confessor" including proper antiphons. Also including two sonatas, La Bevilacqua Op. 8/6 and La Mosta Op. 8/3.]
- Dies Irae – Sonate a quattro viole – Motetti. Ricercar Consort, dir. Philippe Pierlot. Ricercar RIC 236. 2001. [Prosa pro mortuis. Dies irae; La Cetra, Op. 11/17, Op. 11/18; Motets Angelorum ad convivia Op. 10/1 and Suspiro Domine Op. 10/11]
- Il Cuor umano all'incanto (1673). Ensemble Legrenzi. TACTUS TC 621201, 2003 [The oratorio La vendita del cuor umano] (This recording is also available on Oratorios of the Italian Baroque. Ensemble Legrenzi and Complesso Pro Musica Firenze. Brilliant Classics 93354, 2007. Includes Carissimi's Oratorio della SS Vergine and Jonas.)
- La Cetra. Ensemble Baroque de Nice, dir. Gilbert Bezzina. Ligia LIG 030110902, (2003) [Op. 2: La Cornara Op. 2/1, La Spilimberga Op. 2/2, La Donata, Op. 2/7, La Foscari, Op. 2/8 La Torriana, Op. 2/15; La Cetra: Op. 11/3, 4, 9, 13, 14, 15 and 16.]
- La Morte del Cor Penitente. Cecchetti; Invernizzi; Nmircovich; Sonatori De La Gioiosa Marca. Divox 79504. 1996 [The oratorio La Morte del Cor Penitente]
- La vendita del core : oratorio en duex parties. Roger Blanchard (cond.). Paris, Les Discophiles Français DF 730.057. 1962. [This recording is available for downloading at www.dismarc.org.]
- Missa Opus 1 – Sonate d'église. Ensemble Olivier Opdebeeck Cori Spezzati, dir. Olivier Opdebeek. Pierre Verany label PV700033. 2005. (Op. 1: Kyrie, Gloria, Credo; Op. 4 Sonatas La Benaglia Op. 4/3, La Tassa Op. 4/4; Op. 3 motet Adoramus te Op. 3/14.]
- "Motetti" Concerto Italiano, Rinaldo Alessandrini. naive OP30579. 2023. (Adoramus te sanctissimam crucem, Albescite flores, Alma redemptoris mater a5, Ave Regina caelorum a5, Expergiscimini mortales surgite a somno, Exultemus omnes et laetemur, filiae Ierusalem, Letanie a5, Obstupescite caelites obmutescite angeli, Qui non renuntiat omnibus, Quis ascendit in montem sanctum Sion, Regina caeli laetare a5, Salve Regina mater misericordiae a5, Venite omnes currite populi).
- O dilectissime Jesu. Motetti e Sonate. Monika Mauch (sop.), Les Cornets Noirs. ORF CD 355. 2003. [Op. 8 Sonatas: La Pia Op. 8/2, La Rosetta Op. 8/5, La Boiarda Op. 8/8, La Squarzona Op. 8/9, La Cremona Op. 8/10, La Buscha Op. 8/13; La Cetra: Sonata sesta Op. 11/12, Sonata prima Op. 11/13; Op. 17 Motets: O dilectissime Jesu Op. 17/1, O vos delitiarum cultores Op. 17/2, Coronemus non rosis Op. 17/3, Omnes gentes Op. 17/4.]
- Sonate & Balletti. Clematis. Ricercar RIC356, 2016. [Op. 2: La Cornara Op. 2/1, La Frangipana Op. 2/3, La Foscari Op. 2/8, La Zabarella Op. 2/10; Op. 4: La Brembata Op. 4/1, La Pezzoli Op. 4/6, Corrente terza Op. 4/15, Balletto quarto Op. 4/23, Sarabanda prima Op. 4/25, Alamanda terza La Piloni Op. 4/30; Op. 8: L'Obizza Op. 8/4, La Squarzona Op. 8/9, La Cremona Op. 8/10, La Marinona Op. 8/12, La Basadonna Op. 8/14; La Cetra, Op. 11: Sonata seconda Op. 11/2, Sonata quarta Op. 11/4, Sonata seconda Op. 11/8, Sonata prima Op. 11/1, Sonata sesta Op. 11/18; Op. 16: Balletto primo Op. 16/1, Balletto secondo Op. 16/3, Corrente terza Op. 16/5, Corrente nona Op. 16/18]
- Sonate e Balletti per strumenti ad arco. Sonatori de la Gioiosa Marca. Rivo Alto CRR9014, 1991. [Op. 8 Sonatas: La Basadona Op. 8/14, La Cremona Op.8/10, La Crispa Op. 8/16; La Cetra Op. 11: Sonata quinta, Op. 11/11, Sonata sesta Op. 11/12, Sonata prima Op. 11/13, Sonata sesta "o come piace" Op. 11/18; Opus 16 (1691): Balletto terzo, Op. 16/5, Corrente terza, Op. 16/6, Corrente nona Op. 16/18.]
- Sonate e Motetti. Musica Antiqua Praha; Pavel Klikar. Supraphon 3185-2 931. [Op. 8 Sonatas: La Rossetta Op. 8/5, La Squarzona Op. 8/9, La Cremona Op. 8/10, La Marinona Op. 8/12; La Cetra Op. 11: Sonata prima Op. 11/1; Harmonia d'Affetti Devoti, Op. 3: Hodie colletantur Op. 3/1, Humili voce Op. 3/6, Motetti Sacri, Op. 17: O dilectissime Jesu Op. 17/1, O vos qui inter Op. 17/2, Non susurrate Op. 17/9, Omnes gentes Op. 17/4.]
- Testamentum. Missa Laurentana quinque vocibus. Oficina Musicum; . Dynamic CDS710. [The unpublished Missa quinque vocibus; Op. 2: Sonatas La Spilimberga Op. 2/2, La Querina Op. 2/14; Op. 3: Hodie Collaetantur Op. 3/1; Opus 7: Alma Redemptoris Mater Op. 7/14; Opus 10: Congratulamini Filiae Syon Op. 10/2]
- Trio Sonatas 1655. Parnassi Musici. cpo 777 030-2. 2004. [The whole of Opus 2]
- Venice Before Vivaldi – A Portrait of Giovanni Legrenzi. El Mundo; Richard Savino. Koch International KIC 7446. [Opus 2: Sonatas La Foscari Op. 2/8, La Zabarella Op. 2/10, La Donata Op. 2/7 La Cornara Op.2/1, La Spilimberga Op. 2/2; Opus 4: La Benaglia Op. 4/3 La Forni Op. 4/11; La Cetra Op. 11: Op. 11/2, Op. 11/6, Op. 11/7; Motetti Sacri, Op. 17: O dilectissime Jesu Op. 17/1, O mirandum mysterium Op. 17/7]
- Vesperae, Op. 1. Cori Spezzati, dir. Olivier Opdebeeck. Pierre Verany. [The whole of the Vespers music from Op. 1; Op. 4 Sonatas: La Pezzoli Op. 4/6; Op. 3 Motets: Obstupescite Op. 3/13.]
- Oratorio Il Sedecia , Oficina Musicum, direttore Riccardo Favero Oratorio in 2 Parti, Dynamic, CDS711, giugno 2012

Approximately 40 other recordings are available featuring one or more Legrenzi works. By far the most frequently recorded item is Che fiero costume from the opera Eteocle e Polinice (in a 1680 revival, having originally appeared in 1678 in Echi di Riverenza Op. 14), made famous by opera singers including bass Ezio Pinza and tenor Luciano Pavarotti. Sonatas from all of the four volumes in this form are generously represented, with a complete recording of Op. 2 (1655) and most sonatas from the other volumes also available. The sonata for 4 violins from La Cetra, Op. 11/13, and the two unusual sonatas for 4 viola gamba, Op. 11/17 and Op. 11/18, appear on a number of recordings in various transpositions. Most other genres remain under-represented, notably including the surviving operas.
