= Lohengrin (disambiguation) =

Lohengrin is a son of the hero Percival in German art and literature.

Lohengrin may also refer to:

- Lohengrin (opera), the 1850 opera by German composer Richard Wagner
- Lohengrin (Sciarrino), a contemporary short work by Italian composer Salvatore Sciarrino
- Lohengrin (film), a 1936 Italian film
- 9505 Lohengrin, a main-belt asteroid
- VfB Lohengrin 03 Kleve, former German football club in the city that merged with Sportclub Kleve 63 to form 1. FC Kleve
- Lohengrin Filipello (1912–1981), Swiss television presenter
- Dietrich von Lohengrin, an antagonist in the Trinity Blood franchise
- Lohengrin, a German ace from the Wild Cards anthology series
