= Lucia Ronchetti =

Italian composer (born 1963)

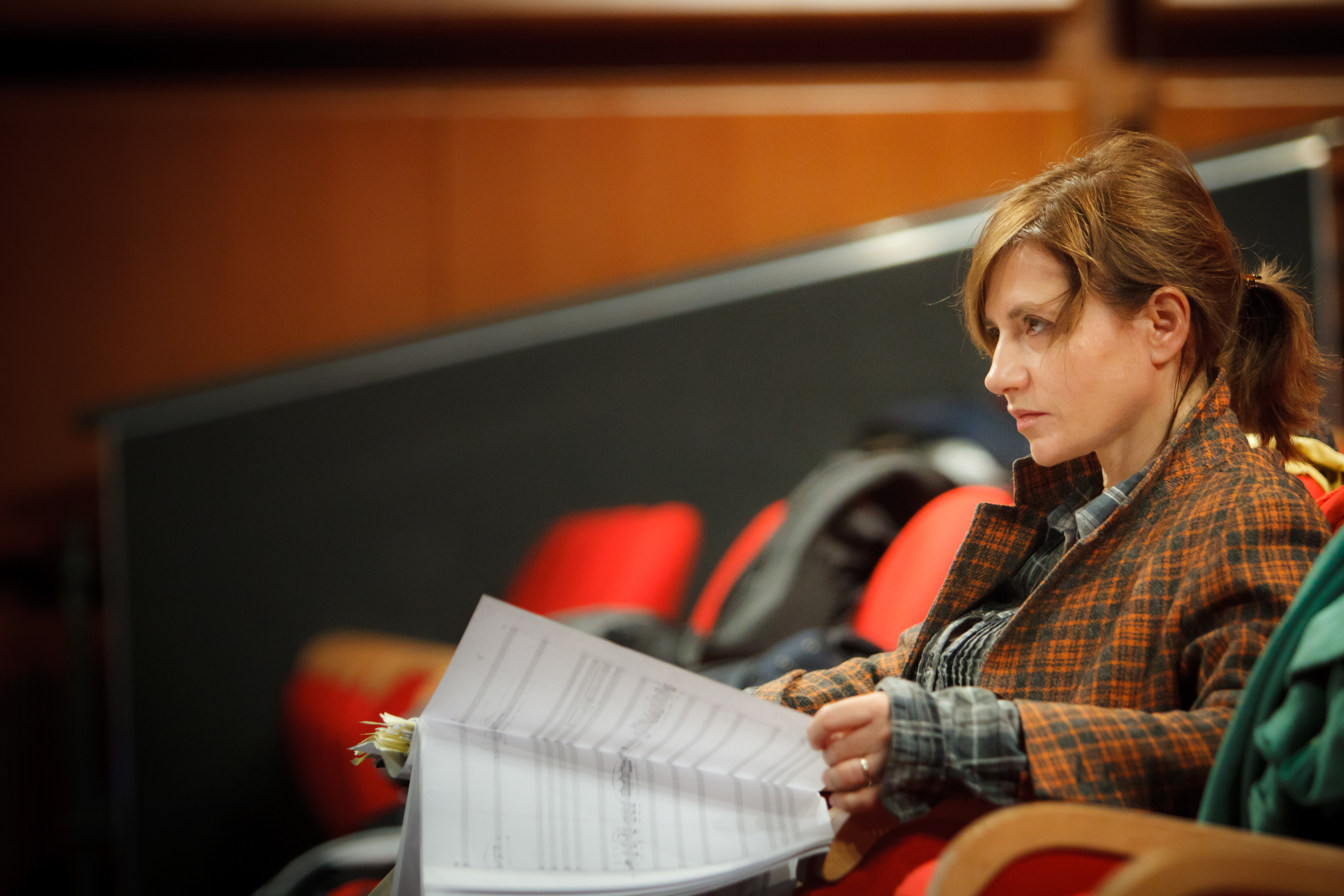
- Lucia Ronchetti in 2011
- Born: 3 February 1963 (age 62); Italy
- Education: Conservatory of Santa Cecilia; University of Paris; École pratique des hautes études, Sorbonne; Columbia University
- Occupation: Composer
- Awards: Dimitri Mitropoulos International Composition Prize

Lucia Ronchetti (born 3 February 1963) is an Italian composer.

== Biography ==
Ronchetti studied composition and computer music at the Conservatory of Santa Cecilia in Rome and took part in composition seminars with Sylvano Bussotti at the Scuola di Musica of Fiesole (1981–85) and with Salvatore Sciarrino at the Corsi Internazionali of Città di Castello (1988–1989). She studied humanities at the Sapienza University of Rome, where she got her degree in 1987, presenting a dissertation on Bruno Maderna's orchestral compositions. In 1991 she received a Diplôme d'Études Approfondies (D.E.A.) in aesthetics from the University of Paris I-Sorbonne. She subsequently studied musicology with François Lesure at the École pratique des hautes études, Sorbonne, and received a doctorate with her thesis on the orchestral style of Ernest Chausson and Wagnerian influence on late 19th-century French orchestral writing. In Paris she participated in composition seminars with Gérard Grisey (1993–1996) and took part in the annual computer music courses at IRCAM (1997) under the supervision of Tristan Murail. In 2005 she was a visiting scholar as a Fulbright Fellow at the Music Department of Columbia University in New York City, having been invited by Tristan Murail.

Her works have been published by Rai Trade, Durand, Ricordi and Lemoine, and produced, commissioned and performed by such institutions as the Bayerische Staatsoper in Munich, Konzerthaus Berlin Rai Radio Tre in Rome, Deutschlandfunk Kultur, Ensemble Modern in Frankfurt, MaerzMusik in Berlin, Musik der Jahrhunderte in Stuttgart, ensemble recherche in Freiburg im Breisgau, Festival Ultrashall in Berlin, RAI National Symphony Orchestra in Turin, WDR Sinfonieorchester in Cologne, La Fenice in Venice, Wittener Tage für neue Kammermusik, Radio France and the Munich Biennale.

== Work ==
Starting in 1998, Ronchetti realised various productions at Technische Universität Berlin (TUB) in collaboration with Folkmar Hein. In 2003 she started working at the Experimentalstudio of Freiburg, where she wrote a cycle of compositions that explore the sound configuration of the viola, with the assistance of André Richard, Reinhold Braig and Joachim Haas and in collaboration with the violist Barbara Maurer; it was presented in Berlin Festival Ultrashall in 2007 and is called Xylocopa Violacea, recorded by Stradivarius in 2010.

She has been working on the compositional treatment of the voice, collaborating intensively with the Neue Vocalsolisten of Stuttgart. They created eight different productions: Studio detto dei venti, for four voices in 2010; Le voyage d'Urien, for voices and ensemble in 2008; Hamlet's Mill, for voices, viola and cello in 2007; Coins and Crosses, for six voices in 2007; Pinocchio, una storia parallela, for four male voices in 2005; Last Desire, a chamber opera for treble voice, countertenor and bass in 2003; Hombre de mucha gravedad, for four voices and string quartet in 2002; and Anatra al sal, Comedia harmonica for six voices in 2000, recorded by Kairos in 2010.

She has realized numerous music theatre projects inspired by the social scene, exploring social concepts in the dramaturgy. The concept of otherness is a topic in Bendel/Schlemihl, Strasse-opern, 2000 to a text by Ivan Vladislavic. Outsider groups and dysptopia feature in Narrenschiffe, and in-transit action, 2010 to a text after Sebastian Brant. Borders (limen are in focus in Der Sonne entgegen, a 2009 chamber opera to a text by Steffi Hansel. transitory mental illness (Le voyage d'Urien, drammaturgia, text after André Gide and 19th-century psychiatric reportages, 2008). Sub-urbanity is featured in Rumori da monumenti, 2007 to a text by Ivan Vladislavic, and also in Sebenza e-mine, an audio play of 2010 in collaboration with Philip Miller.

For her music theatre projects, she has collaborated with writers Ermanno Cavazzoni, Ivan Vladislavic and Eugene Ostashevsky, and with artists such as Toti Scialoja, Alberto Sorbelli, Judith Cahen, Dörte Meyer, Adrian Tranquilli, Elisabetta Benassi, and Mirella Weingarten, and with sound designers Marie-Hélène Serra, Folkmar Hein, André Richard, Reinhold Braig, Carl Faia, Olivier Pasquet and Thomas Seelig. Her opera Inferno based on Dante's Divine Comedy, using his poetry, was commissioned by the Oper Frankfurt, and was premiered in a concert performance at the Bockenheimer Depot on 27 June 2021, conducted by Tito Ceccherini.

=== Compositions ===
- Music theatre
  - Inferno (2020), opera based on Dante's Divine Comedy using his poetry
  - Lezioni di tenebra (2010) for voices and ensemble, after Giasone by Francesco Cavalli
  - Narrenschiffe (2009–2010) In-transit actions after Sebastian Brant
  - Der Sonne entgegen (2007–2009) for 14 voices, ensemble and live (text by S. Hensel)
  - Last Desire (2004) for treble voice, countertenor, bass, viola (text after Oscar Wilde's Salome)
  - L'ape apatica (2001) for treble voices, ensemble and live (text by Toti Scialoja)
  - Le tentazioni di Girolamo (1995) for actor, soloists and live electronics (text by E. Cavazzoni)
  - Musikfässli (1994) for actor, soloists and live electronics after Adolf Wölfli
- Theatrical concert works
  - Prosopopeia (2009) for vocal ensemble and instrumental ensemble
  - Rumori da monumenti (2008) for recorded voice and ensemble (text by I. Vladislavic)
  - Le Voyage d'Urien (2008) for 5 voices and ensemble
  - Xylocopa Violacea (2007) for solo viola and live electronics
  - Albertine (2007) for female voice and whispering public (text from M. Proust)
  - Hamlet's Mill (2007) for soprano, bass, viola and cello (text by E. Ostashevsky)
  - Pinocchio, una storia parallela (2005) for four male voices (text from G. Manganelli)
  - Hombre de mucha gravedad (2002) for vocal quartet and string quartet
  - BendelSchlemihl (2000) for recorded voices, accordion and live (text by I. Vladislavic)
  - Anatra al sal (1999) Comedia harmonica for six voices (text by E. Cavazzoni)
- Orchestral
  - Arborescence (2004)
  - Déclive-Étude (2002)
  - Quaderno gotico (1999)
  - Schiffbruch mit Zuschauer (1995, rev. 1999)
  - Die Sorge getht über den Fluss (1995) for flute, clarinet and orchestra
- Chamber music
  - Rosso pompeiano (2010) Scherzo for ensemble
  - Studio detto dei venti (2010) A medley attempt for 6 voices
  - Like winter moving backwards (2009) A study for one piano, four hands
  - Le nuove musiche di Giulio Caccini detto Romano, 1601, lesson for solo voice (2008)
  - Coins and crosses (2007) A Yessong, for vocal ensemble
  - In Shape of Anxieties (2005) In Nomine Studio for ensemble
  - The Glazed Roof (2005) for ensemble
  - Opus 100 (2005) Kriptomnesie da Schubert, for violino, cello and piano
  - Il sonno di Atys (2004) for viola and live electronics
  - Geographisches Heft (2001) Studio da Adolf Wölfli, for ensemble
- Audio plays
  - Sebenza e-mine (2010) in collaboration with Philip Miller
  - Il Castello d'Atlante (2007)
  - Rivelazione (1998) in collaboration with Ermanno Cavazzoni

== Awards ==
- 2008 Music Theatre Now Prize from the International Theatre Institute
- 2006 Composer in residence, Yaddo, New York
- 2005–06 Composer in residence, Berliner Künstlerprogramm, D.A.A.D.
- 2005 Visiting scholar (Fulbright Fellow), Columbia University, New York
- 2003–04 Composer in residence, Staatsoper Stuttgart (Forum Neues Musiktheater)
- 2003 Composer in residence, The MacDowell Colony, Peterborough, U.S.
- 2000–01 Composer in residence, Akademie Schloss Solitude, Stuttgart
- 2000 Composition Prize of the Federazione Cemat, Rome
- 1997 Fellowship of the Fondation des Treilles, Paris
- 1997 Dimitri Mitropoulos International Composition Prize, Athens
- 1997 Erato-Farnesina Fellowship, Italian Ministry of Foreign Affairs
- 1995 Progetto Dionysos Composition Prize, Italian Ministry of Culture
- 1993 Composer in residence, Fondation Nadia Boulanger, Paris
- 1988–92 Doctoral studies fellowship, Italian Ministry of Universities
