= Wendy Heller =

American musicologist

- Born: November 17, 1955 (age 70)
- Occupation: Musicologist
- Known for: Scholarship on opera, gender, and classical reception in early modern Italy
- Title: Scheide Professor of Music History
- Spouse: Jack Hill
- Awards: Rome Prize (2000–01); Book Prize, Society for the Study of Early Modern Women (2004)

Academic background
- Education: New England Conservatory (BM, MM); Brandeis University (PhD)

Academic work
- Discipline: Musicology
- Sub-discipline: Opera studies; early modern music; classical reception
- Institutions: Princeton University

Wendy Beth Heller (born 17 November 1955) is an American musicologist and music editor and the Scheide Professor of Music History at Princeton University. A specialist in Italian opera, she focuses on interdisciplinary scholarship connecting music to gender and sexuality, art history, Italian literature, and dance history, as well as for her work preparing performing editions of baroque opera. She is also known for her work on classical reception in European music.

== Early life and education ==
Heller trained as a classical singer, earning a Bachelor of Music in vocal performance from the New England Conservatory in 1978. She subsequently spent twelve years as cantor and director of music at Congregation Klal Yisrael in Stoughton, Massachusetts, while continuing her musical studies. She returned to the New England Conservatory for a Master of Music in musicology, completed in 1986 with academic honors and distinction in performance, and went on to earn a Ph.D. in musicology from Brandeis University in 1995. In recognition of her career, the New England Conservatory named her an honorary alumna in 2003.

Before joining Princeton, Heller held a series of visiting and adjunct teaching positions, including at Connecticut College, Tufts University, the Boston Conservatory, and Brandeis University, and was a Mellon Fellow at Columbia University's Society of Fellows in the Humanities from 1997 to 1998.

== Academic career ==
Heller joined the Princeton University Department of Music as an assistant professor in 1998, was promoted to associate professor in 2004, and to professor in 2008. She has since been named the Scheide Professor of Music History, an endowed chair.

At Princeton, Heller served as acting chair of the Department of Music in 2011–12 and as chair from 2015 to 2022. She directed the Program in Italian Studies from 2005 to 2022 and is currently director of undergraduate studies in the Department of Music. Heller also holds affiliated appointments in the Department of Classics and the Department of French and Italian, and has held visiting appointments at the Folger Institute (2007) and the Villa I Tatti, Harvard University's Center for Italian Renaissance Studies in Florence (2006–07).

== Research ==
Heller's scholarship approaches opera—especially the Italian baroque repertoire of Monteverdi, Cavalli, and Handel—from interdisciplinary perspectives spanning gender and sexuality, art history, Italian literature, dance history, historical vocal technique, and the reception of classical antiquity. Reflecting on what first drew her to seventeenth-century Venetian opera, Heller has said she was struck by the contradiction of an era in which "women ... are supposed to be silent and chaste, but they're singing on the stage," and by opera's capacity to express "extra-musical" social and cultural tensions.

=== Opera, gender, and classical reception ===
Heller's first book, Emblems of Eloquence: Opera and Women's Voices in Seventeenth-Century Venice (University of California Press, 2003), examines how debates over women's chastity, power, and sexuality in seventeenth-century Venice shaped the female characters—historical and mythological—portrayed on the city's operatic stage. One of the first major studies of women in baroque opera, it was a finalist for the American Musicological Society's Otto Kinkeldey Award and won the Society for the Study of Early Modern Women's annual book prize in 2004.

Along with studies of the music of Cavalli, Handel, Barbara Strozzi, Henry Purcell, and Bach, Heller has also explored the reception of classical antiquity (particularly Ovid's Metamorphoses, Homer, and Tacitus) on the early modern operatic stage. In recent years, she has focused on arguing that early opera's engagement with Ovidian metamorphosis was not incidental but central to the new genre's dramaturgy, since opera itself functions as "a mechanism of metamorphosis ... taking these tales and turning them into something on the stage."

=== Scholarly editions and performance ===
Heller's scholarship evinces a sustained commitment to the performance of baroque opera. She has served as dramaturg for several Princeton University productions, including Monteverdi's Il ritorno d'Ulisse in patria and L'incoronazione di Poppea and Cavalli's La Calisto, and more recently for the Industry's production of The Comet/Poppea, created by Anthony Roth Costanzo and directed by Yuval Sharon. A member of the editorial board for the complete critical edition of Cavalli's operas (Opere, Bärenreiter), Heller prepared the critical edition of Cavalli's Veremonda, l'amazzone di Aragona (1652), published by Bärenreiter in 2025; her edition was previously used in a production at the 2016 Schwetzingen Festival, for which she served as a consultant. Heller's critical edition of Handel's opera Admeto for the Hallische Händel-Ausgabe is expected in 2027.

=== Cross-cultural and interdisciplinary interests ===
Heller has extended her interest in vocal performance beyond the European operatic tradition. Her studies with the Shanghai Jingju Theatre Company as a participant in Princeton's Peking Opera Immersion Program in Shanghai (2018–2019) resulted in a comparative paper on the convention of feigned madness, contrasting the Peking opera The Cosmic Blade with the seventeenth-century Venetian opera La finta pazza, at the International Musicological Society's congress in Athens.

Heller also maintains an active connection to Jewish liturgical music, dating to her years as a cantorial soloist, and has published encyclopedia entries on cantors for the YIVO Encyclopedia of Jews in Eastern Europe. She began studying Yiddish during the COVID-19 pandemic through YIVO, the Yiddish Institute in New York, and has spoken of an interest in the Yiddish song repertory and Yiddish theater.

== Professional service ==
Heller has served on the editorial or advisory boards of the Journal of the American Musicological Society (2001–06), the Journal of Musicology, the Cambridge Opera Journal (associate editor, 1998–2003; editorial board thereafter), the Journal of Seventeenth-Century Music (1996–2014), Early Modern Women: An Interdisciplinary Journal, and, since 2022, Cambridge University Press's Renaissance Elements series. She co-edited a special issue of the Cambridge Opera Journal on dance and Venetian opera with Rebecca Harris-Warrick in 2003.

Within the American Musicological Society, she has served as an elected director-at-large (2010–12), chaired its Committee on the Status of Women (2006–10), and served on its Publications Committee and its Otto Kinkeldey Award committee. She has been a board member of the American Handel Society since 2001, repeatedly chairing its program and local-arrangements committees for its biennial meetings, including at Princeton in 2007 and 2013. In the Society for Seventeenth-Century Music, Heller served as vice president from 2015 to 2017, was named an honorary member in 2023, and is slated to become president in 2027. She has also served on the executive committee of the Society for the Study of Early Modern Women and twice chaired its prize committee, and sits on the Venice Research Board of the Gladys Krieble Delmas Foundation.

== Honors and awards ==
- American Musicological Society AMS 50 Dissertation Fellowship (1993)
- National Endowment for the Humanities Dissertation Fellowship (1994) and Fellowship for Independent Scholars (1996–97)
- Mellon Fellow, Society of Fellows in the Humanities, Columbia University (1997–98)
- Rome Prize in Post-Classical Humanistic Studies, American Academy in Rome (2000–01)
- Visiting Fellowship, New College, University of Oxford (2001)
- Book Prize, Society for the Study of Early Modern Women, for Emblems of Eloquence (2004); the same book was a finalist for the American Musicological Society's Otto Kinkeldey Award (2004)
- Frederick Burkhardt Fellowship at Villa I Tatti, American Council of Learned Societies (2006–07)
- Sylvan and Pamela C. Coleman Memorial Fellowship, Metropolitan Museum of Art (2010–11)
- Old Dominion Professorship, Princeton University Council of the Humanities (2014–15)
- Honorary Alumna, New England Conservatory (2003)
- Honorary Member, Society for Seventeenth-Century Music (2023)

== Personal life ==
Heller lives in Lawrenceville, New Jersey, with her husband, Jack Hill.

== Selected publications ==
- Emblems of Eloquence: Opera and Women's Voices in Seventeenth-Century Venice. Berkeley: University of California Press, 2003.
- Music in the Baroque. Western Music in Context: A Norton History. New York: W. W. Norton, 2013.
- Anthology for Music in the Baroque. New York: W. W. Norton, 2013.
- Staging History: Historical Drama in Britain and America, 1780–1860, edited with Michael Burden, Jonathan Hicks, and Ellen Lockhart. Oxford: Bodleian Library Publishing, 2016.
- Performing Homer: The Voyage of Ulysses from Epic to Opera, edited with Eleonora Stoppino. Abingdon: Routledge, 2019.
- Barbara Strozzi in Context, edited with Beth Glixon. Cambridge: Cambridge University Press, 2026.
