= Younghi Pagh-Paan =

South Korean composer (born 1945)

- Hangul: 박영희
- Hanja: 朴泳姬
- Revised Romanization: Bak Yeonghui
- McCune–Reischauer: Pak Yŏnghŭi

Younghi Pagh-Paan (born 1945) is a South Korean composer.

== Life ==
Pagh‑Paan was born in Cheongju, Chungcheongbuk-do, South Korea. She studied music at the Seoul National University from 1965 to 1971. In 1974 she received a DAAD scholarship to study in Germany and entered the Freiburg Musikhochschule, where she studied composition with Klaus Huber, analysis with Brian Ferneyhough, music theory with Peter Förtig and piano with Edith Picht-Axenfeld.

After completing her studies, she took guest professorships at Graz in 1991 and Karlsruhe in 1992–93. In 1994 she became a professor of composition at the University of the Arts Bremen. She founded and serves as director of Atelier Neue Musik.

She was one of the top 10 performed composers on the Internationalen Ferienkurse für Neue Musik between 1946 and 2014.

== Honors and awards ==
- 1978 1st Prize at the 5th Composers Seminar in Boswil (Switzerland)
- 1979 1st Prize at the International Rostrum of Composers (Unesco, Pads)
- 1979 Nan‑Pa Music Prize, Korea
- 1980 1st Prize of the City of Stuttgart
- 1980/1981 Scholarship at the Südwestfunk's Heinrich‑Strobel-Stiftung
- 1985 Scholarship from the Kunststiftung of Baden-Württemberg
- 1995 Heidelberg Artists Prize
- 2006 Lifetime Achievement Award of Seoul National University
- 2007 Order of Civil Merit of the Republic of Korea (South Korea)
- 2009 15th KBS Global Korean Award
- 2009 Member of the Akademie der Künste, Berlin
- 2020 Berliner Kunstpreis

== Works ==
Her works include:

- 1971 PA-MUN
- 1975 Dreisam-Nore
- 1977 Man-Nam I
- 1977/86 MAN-NAM II
- 1977/2005 Man-Nam III
- 1979 NUN
- 1979 Sori
- 1981 Madi
- 1982 PYON-KYONG
- 1983 Flammenzeichen (Sign of the Flames)
- 1984 AA-GA I
- 1984/85 NO-UL
- 1985 'HIN-NUN I
- 1986/87 NIM
- 1987/88 TA-RYONG II
- 1988/89 HWANG-TO / Yellow Earth
- 1988/98 TA-RYONG VI
- 1989–1998 HWANG-TO II
- 1990 ma-am (Mein Herz)
- 1990/91 MA-UM
- 1991 TA-RYONG IV
- 1991 TSI-SHIN / TA-RYONG III
- 1991 Mein Herz
- 1992 U-MUL / The Well
- 1992/94 Rast in einem alten Kloster
- 1992/1993 BIDAN-SIL / Silk Thread
- 1993 HANG-SANG I
- 1993/94 TSI-SHIN-KUT / The Ritual of the Earth Spirit
- 1994 HANG-SANG II
- 1995 TA-RYONG V
- 1995/96 SOWON / The Wish
- 1996 NE MA-UM
- 1996 NOCH...
- 1997 Die Insel schwimmt
- 1997 In dunkeln Träumen...
- 1997/98 GO-UN NIM
- 1998 sowon...borira
- 1999 BI-YU
- 1999/2000 IO
- 2000 Roaring Hooves
- 2000/01 Dorthin, wo der Himmel endet
- 2002 Louise Labé
- 2002 Silbersaiten
- 2003 Moira
- 2004/05 Wundgeträumt
- 2005 Hin-Nun II / White Snow
- 2006 Mondschatten (Moon Shadow)
- 2007 Bleibt in mir und ich in euch
- 2007 Das Universum atmet, es wächst und schwindet
- 2007 Gi-da-ryu-ra / Warte nur
- 2007 In luce ambulemus
- 2007 Qui-Han-Nim / Edler Mann
- 2007 Vide Domine, vide afflictionem nostram
- 2008 Fanfare
- 2008 I thirst
- 2009 Attende, Domine, miserecordiam tuam
- 2009 Den Müttern
- 2009 Silbersaiten III
- 2009 Unterm Sternenlicht
- 2010 Im Lichte wollen wir wandeln
- 2010 Silbersaiten II
- 2010 Silbersaiten
- 2010/2011 Hohes und tiefes Licht
