= Inferno (opera) =

Opera with music by Lucia Ronchetti

- Opera by Lucia Ronchetti
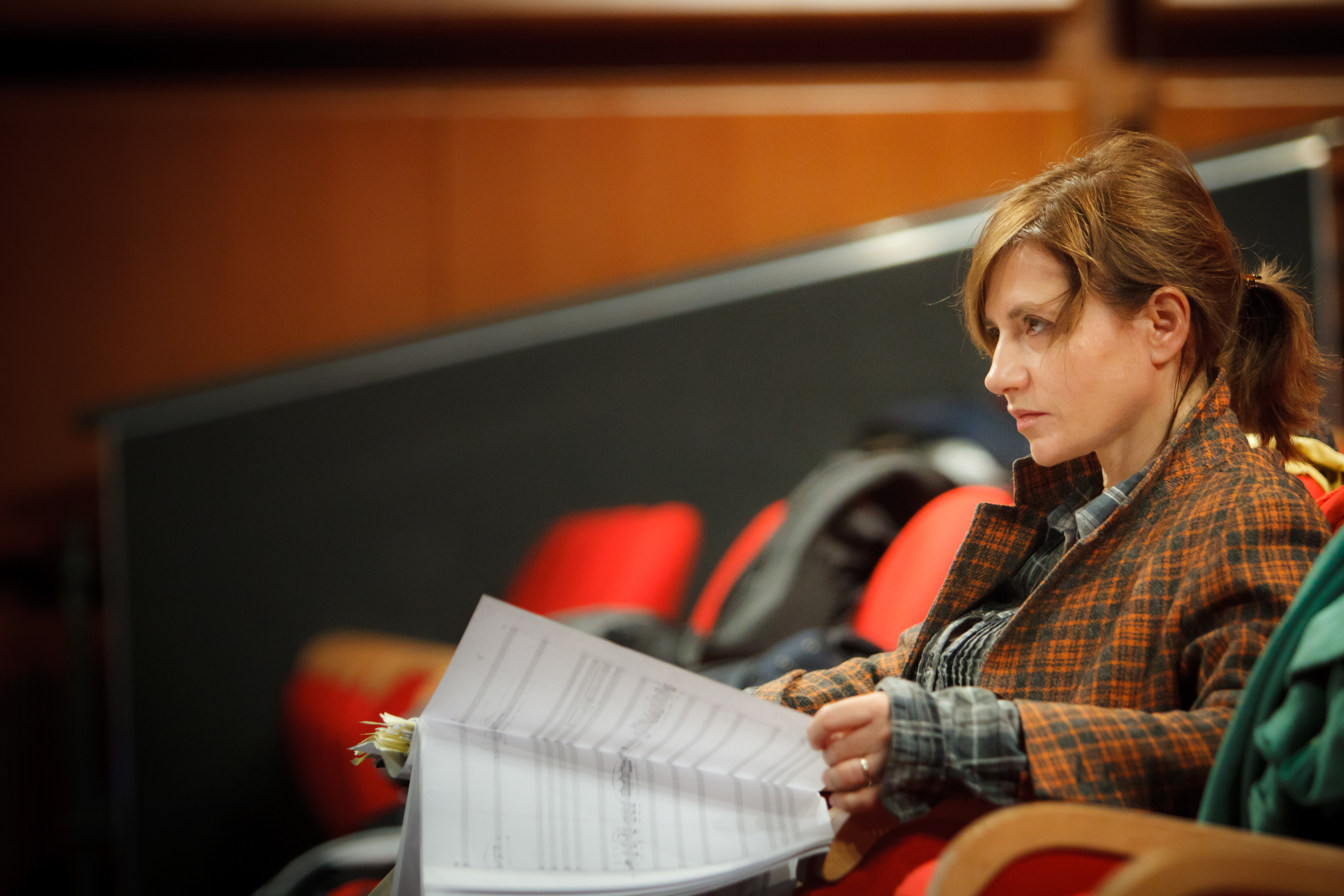
- Lucia Ronchetti in 2011
- Librettist: Lucia Ronchetti
- Language: German; Italian
- Based on: Dante's Inferno
- Premiere: 27 June 2021; Oper Frankfurt

Inferno is an opera based on Dante's Divine Comedy with music by Lucia Ronchetti. The libretto mostly by the composer uses much of Dante's poetry. Commissioned by the Oper Frankfurt, the opera was first performed in a concert performance at the Bockenheimer Depot on 27 June 2021, conducted by Tito Ceccherini.

== History ==
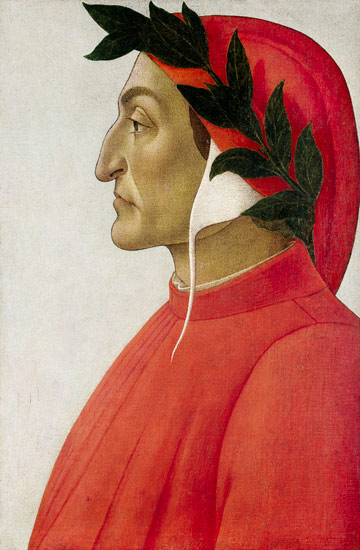
Dante, whose work inspired the opera and is the main character, portrayed by Botticelli

The Italian composer Lucia Ronchetti was inspired for her opera Inferno by the first part, Inferno, of Dante's Divine Comedy which was written in Italian poetry, unusual at his time. She compiled the libretto mostly herself, using quotation from Dante's work unchanged. She noted that she selected episodes for the characters' eccentric and bizarre actions, without moral evaluation, as an image of a city community at the beginning of a new era, inhabited by assassins, thieves, sex workers, merchants, politicians, adulterers, friars and nuns. She felt that Dante described them with black humor, set in natural scenarios with rivers, abysses, storms, earthquakes, rains of fire and ice. The last character that Dante meets is Lucifer. Ronchetti developed soundscapes for the situations.

Ronchetti wrote the work on a commission by the Oper Frankfurt. The opera was planned to be premiered in 2020, but due to the COVID-19 pandemic, it was postponed, and then first performed in a concert version at the Bockenheimer Depot on 27 June 2021, conducted by Tito Ceccherini.

The performers are partly speaking roles, partly singers. Dante is portrayed by a speaker, and his "inner voice" by a vocal quartet. The instruments are mainly brass and timpani, with a string quartet and its players reserved for some scenes.
