= Salvatore Sciarrino =

Italian composer

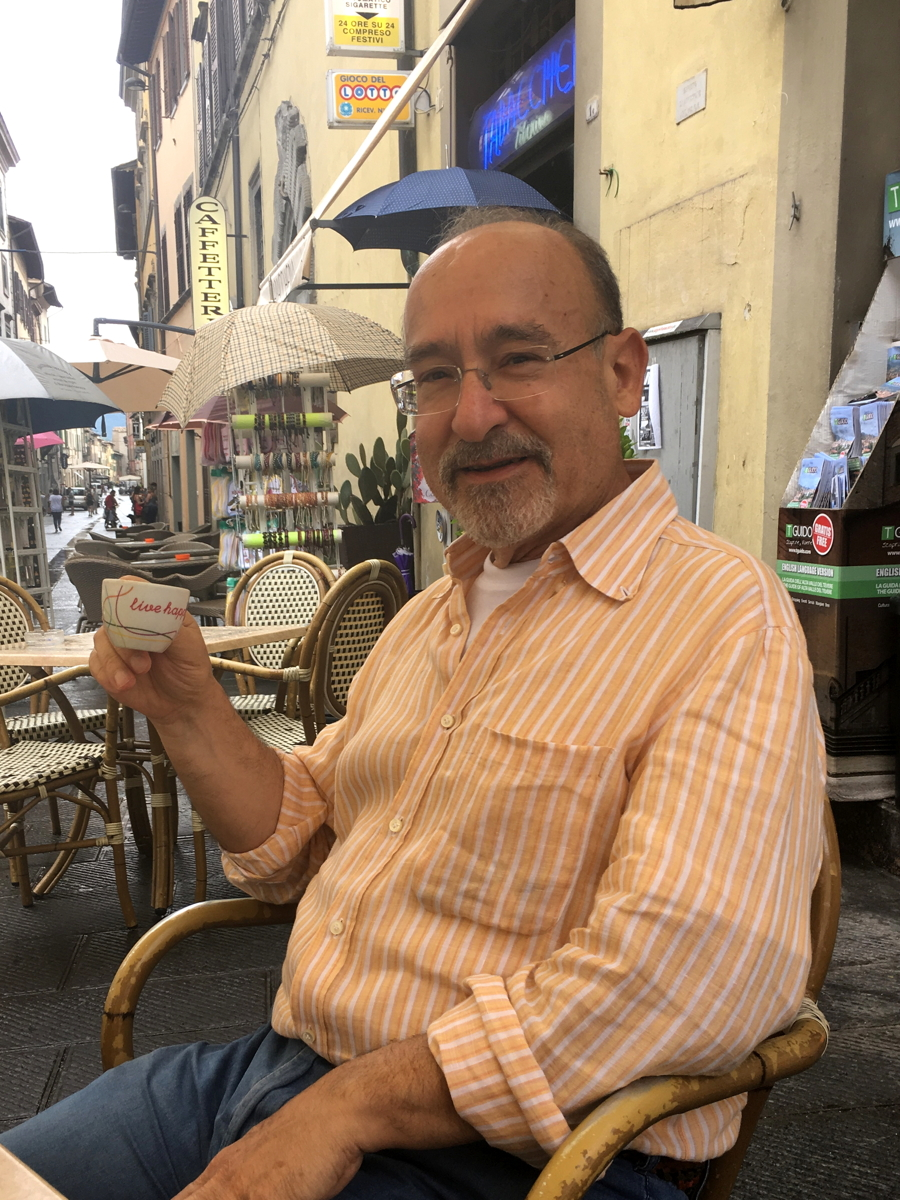
- Sciarrino in 2016
- Born: 4 April 1947 (age 79); Palermo, Italy
- Education: Accademia di Santa Cecilia
- Occupations: Composer; Academic teacher
- Organizations: Milan Conservatory
- Works: List of compositions
- Awards: Feltrinelli Prize; Salzburg Music Prize; BBVA Foundation Frontiers of Knowledge Awards
- Website: salvatoresciarrino.eu

Salvatore Sciarrino (born 4 April 1947) is an Italian composer of contemporary classical music. Described as "the best-known and most performed Italian composer" of the present day, his works include Quaderno di strada (2003) and La porta della legge (2006–08).

== Biography ==
A native of Palermo, the young Sciarrino was attracted to the visual arts, but began experimenting with music when he was twelve. Though he had some lessons from Antonino Titone and Turi Belfiore, he is primarily self-taught as a composer. After his classical studies and a few years of university in his home city, in 1969 he moved to Rome, where he attended Franco Evangelisti's course in electronic music at the Accademia di Santa Cecilia.

In 1977, Sciarrino moved from Rome to Milan, where he taught at the conservatory until 1982. By this time his compositional career had expanded to the point where he could withdraw from teaching, and he moved to Città di Castello, in Umbria, where he has lived ever since. He nevertheless has continued to teach occasionally in Florence and Bologna, as well as in Città di Castello. Some of his notable students include Francesco Filidei, Lucia Ronchetti, David Monacchi, and Maurizio Pisati. See: List of music students by teacher: R to S#Salvatore Sciarrino.

He has composed for: Teatro alla Scala, RAI, Teatro del Maggio Musicale Fiorentino, Biennale di Venezia, Teatro La Fenice di Venezia, Teatro Carlo Felice di Genova, Fondazione Arena di Verona, Stuttgart State Opera, Brussels La Monnaie, Oper Frankfurt, Amsterdam Concertgebouw, London Symphony Orchestra, Tokyo Suntory Hall. He has also composed for the following festivals: Schwetzingen Festival, Donaueschinger Musiktage, Witten, Salzburg, New York, Wien Modern, Wiener Festwochen, Berliner Festspiele Musik, Holland Festival, Alborough, Festival d'Automne (Paris), Ultima (Oslo).

His music was published by Ricordi from 1969 to 2004. Since 2005, Rai Trade (now RaiCom) publishes Sciarrino’s works.

Sciarrino’s discography is extensive: there are over 70 CDs, many of which have won awards and released on labels such as Kairos, Neos, and Stradivarius.

Apart from being the author of most of the librettos of his operas, Sciarrino has written many articles, essays and texts, some of which have been chosen and collected in Carte da suono, CIDIM – Novecento, 2001. His book about musical form: Le figure della musica da Beethoven a oggi (Ricordi 1998) is particularly important.

From 1978 to 1980, he was Artistic Director of Teatro Comunale di Bologna, Academic of Santa Cecilia (Roma), Academic of Fine Arts of Bavaria and Academic of the Arts (Berlin).

He has been teaching at the Accademia Musicale Chigiana since 2013; beforehand he held a composition class in 1983 and in 2002.

Sciarrino has won many awards, among the most recent are: Prince Pierre de Monaco (2003) and the prestigious Feltrinelli Prize (2003). He is also the first prizewinner of the newly created Salzburg Music Prize (2006), an International composition prize established by Salzburg. He received the 2011 BBVA Foundation Frontiers of Knowledge Awards of Contemporary Music for renewing the possibilities of vocal and instrumental music and for the singularity of his sound materials. Sciarrino has developed a new and unique syntax and a manner of combining extreme synthesis with richness of detail.

== Musical style ==
Pietro Misuraca, in one of the most recent books on the composer's music (2018), wrote:

A stranger (also for reasons of age) to the pointillist-structuralist phase of the New Music, Sciarrino, along with Iannis Xenakis and György Ligeti, was among the voices most lucidly critical of Darmstadt's orthodoxy, its contradictions and its limits, animated by that concrete desire for "sound" that some other composers were developing in those years.

== Works ==
Sciarrino's works include a large body of chamber music, including many pieces for wind instruments, five piano sonatas, and several operas or theatrical works: Lohengrin (1982), Perseo ed Andromeda (1990), Infinito nero (1998), Luci mie traditrici (1998), Macbeth (2002), and Da gelo a gelo (2006).

He published with Casa Ricordi from 1969 to 2004; from the following year, the exclusive rights to Sciarrino's works passed to Rai Trade. His discography is wide-ranging, including more than eighty titles, published by international labels such as Stradivarius, Neos, Arion, and Kairos and repeatedly mentioned and rewarded.
