= Cetra =

Latin synonym for the cithara

Renaissance cetra or citole, c. 1320, from the lower Basilica of the church of Saint Francis in Assisi, Italy. This identity was suggested by researcher Alice Margerum, who said that in the period of the painting, "citole-related names" were little used in Italy, but cetra or cetera was. She said she believes that this particular era of the instrument is the instrument referred to by Dante in De vulgari eloquentia .

Cetra, a Latin word borrowed from Greek, is an Italian descendant of κιθάρα (cithara). It is a synonym for the cittern but has been used for the citole and cithara (the lyre-form) and cythara (the lyre-form developing into a necked instrument).

The cithara was a stringed musical instrument, constructed in wood and similar to the lyre, with a larger harmonic case. It was widely used in ancient times. The instrument spread from ancient Greece, where it was played by professional citaredi, to Rome and Corsica. While originally a word for a lyre in Greece, eventually the word was applied to a necked-instrument.

The name cetra was seen by musicologist and historian Laurence Wright as being synonymous with the citole, and in his entry in the New Grove Dictionary of Musical Instruments he said that cetera and cetra were Italian language words for the citole. The cetra used this way was a plucked instrument, related to the fiddle and used c. 1200-1350.

In the Renaissance, the term 'cetra' came to signify a pear-shaped instrument with a flat sound-board and a long neck, whose pairs of metal strings were plucked. The Italian citole, known there as cetra, eventually became the cittern.

== Use of the word in musical works ==
The name La Cetra was also used by a number of composers to entitle sets of their works. These composers included Legrenzi, Marcello and Vivaldi.

- Giovanni Legrenzi (1626–1690), a prominent composer in Venice in the late 17th century, was the first to use the name La Cetra, for a collection of 18 sonatas published in Venice in 1673. La Cetra was an early example of a collection of sonatas published in sets of six (in this case, three sets of six) which was to become a standard practice. As with the remainder of Legrenzi’s considerable output of sonatas – La Cetra was his fourth volume – the majority are for stringed instruments with organ continuo. There are, however, two curious sonatas in La Cetra set for a quartet of viols which can furthermore be played a minor third lower by simply changing the clefs. La Cetra is in a number of respects more modern than many of its predecessors (including Legrenzi’s own collections). It is, for example, mainly scored for the violins and violas that were replacing viols as the main stringed instrument, while the music itself reflects an increasing interest in tonality whereas previously the modal system had played a significant role in determining the ordering of sonatas. La Cetra was to become the most highly esteemed of Legrenzi’s works, and the impact of the sonatas carried his name into the history of European music.
- Alessandro Marcello (1669–1747), who lived and worked somewhat later in Venice, published a set of 6 concerti he had written under the title of La Cetra. These concerti are "unusual for their wind solo parts, concision and use of counterpoint within a broadly Vivaldian style," according to Grove.
- Antonio Vivaldi (1678–1741), the Red Priest of Venice, used the name La cetra for two different sets of his works.
  - The first set that he called La cetra consisted of 12 concertos, Op. 9, his last great set of printed violin concerti. He dedicated them to the music-loving Habsburg monarch, the Emperor Charles VI in 1727.
  - The following year, 1728, Vivaldi wrote another set of 12 concerti that he again, for unknown reasons, named La cetra. He dedicated this new set of concerti again to Charles VI and gave him the manuscript of the concerti. The concerti were never published. They have been offered in reconstructed form by Andrew Manze and The English Consort as Concertos for the Emperor.

In Monteverdi's opera L'Orfeo (1607, libretto by Alessandro Striggio) Orpheus refers to his instrument as a Cetra (e.g. in the aria "Qual honor di te fia degno, mia cetra onnipotente", act 4).

== See also ==
- Citole main article about the instrument in Europe
- Cithara article about the lyre-form
- Cythara article about the lyre-form developing into a necked instrument

== Sources ==
- The Grove Concise Dictionary of Music, Oxford University Press, 1994
- Liner notes by Andrew Manze for Vivaldi's Concertos for the Emperor. Performed by The English Consort directed by Andrew Manze (Harmonia Mundi 907332).
