= Leucippo (Hasse) =

Opera by Johann Adolf Hasse

Leucippo, favola pastorale in 3 acts, is an Italian-language opera by Johann Adolf Hasse to a libretto by Giovanni Claudio Pasquini premiered at the Hubertusburg in 1747 and revived at Carnival 1751–52.

== Broadcast ==
Schwetzingen Festival 2014, with Concerto Köln, conductor Konrad Junghänel
