= Klaus Huber =

Swiss composer (1924–2017)

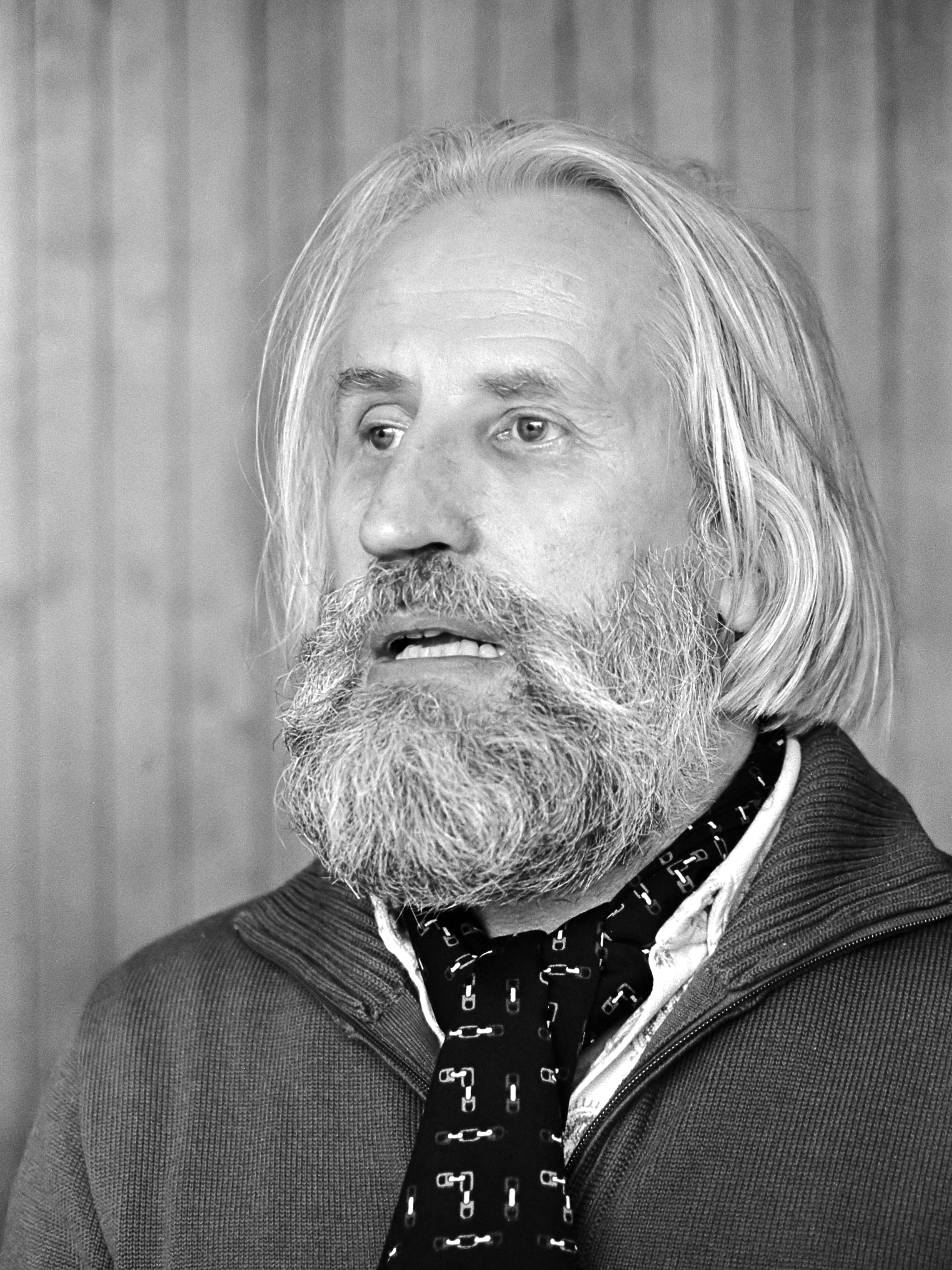
- Huber in 1981
- Born: 30 November 1924; Bern, Switzerland
- Died: 2 October 2017 (aged 92); Perugia, Italy
- Education: Zurich University of the Arts
- Occupations: Composer; Academic teacher
- Organizations: City of Basel Music Academy; Hochschule für Musik Freiburg
- Awards: Ernst von Siemens Music Prize

Klaus Huber (30 November 1924 – 2 October 2017) was a Swiss composer and academic based in Basel and Freiburg. Among his students were Brian Ferneyhough, Michael Jarrell, Younghi Pagh-Paan, Toshio Hosokawa, Wolfgang Rihm, and Kaija Saariaho. He received the Ernst von Siemens Music Prize in 2009, among other awards.

== Early life and education ==
Huber was born on 30 November, 1924 in Bern, Switzerland. He first studied violin and music pedagogy from 1947 to 1949 at the Zurich Conservatory with Stefi Geyer. While studying composition alongside Willy Burkhard, Huber served as a violin teacher at the Zurich Conservatory from 1949 to 1955. He continued his composition studies with Boris Blacher in Berlin.

== Career ==
As a composer, Huber began with serial music influenced by Anton Webern. His international breakthrough came in 1959 with the world premiere of his chamber cantata Des Engels Anredung an die Seele at the Weltmusiktage (World Music Days) of the Internationale Gesellschaft für Neue Musik in Rome. Unusually for the time, he used consonant intervals within a strictly serial context.

He became one of the leading figures of his generation in Europe, alongside Pierre Boulez and Karlheinz Stockhausen. He composed extensively for chamber ensembles, choirs, soloists, and orchestra. His works for the theatre look for scenes beyond opera and oratorio. Huber was a socially and politically conscious composer, and his music often conveys a humanistic message. He set texts by biblical prophets and medieval mystics such as Hildegard of Bingen. He was also inspired by texts of Augustine, Andreas Gryphius, Ernst Bloch, Heinrich Böll, and of Latin American liberation theologians. From the 1980s, Huber studied Arabic music and poetry and included their influences in his works.

Huber taught music history at the Lucerne Conservatory from 1960 to 1963, and composition at the City of Basel Music Academy (1961–72) and at the Hochschule für Musik Freiburg (1973–90). He was also appointed director of the composition seminars at the Gaudeamus Foundation in Bilthoven, Netherlands, in 1966, 1968, and 1972. Additionally, he held international visiting professorships and composition classes in (among others) Paris, London, Geneva, Milan, Lyon, Montreal, Sarajevo, and Tatui (Brazil). Several of his students became internationally recognized composers, including Brian Ferneyhough, Michael Jarrell, Younghi Pagh-Paan (later his wife), Toshio Hosokawa, Wolfgang Rihm, and Kaija Saariaho. He was a member of the Akademie der Künste in Berlin from 1986. His manuscripts are kept by the Paul Sacher Foundation in Basel.

== Compositions ==
An inventory of Huber's music manuscripts at the Paul Sacher Foundation was published in 2009.

=== Stage works ===
- Jot oder Wann kommt der Herr zurück / Dialektische Oper in zwei Teilen (1973) Opera in two parts. Text: Philip Oxman, in German by Kurt Marti and Dietrich Ritschl
- Schwarzerde (1997–2001) Stage work in nine sequences. Text: Michael Schindhelm in cooperation with Klaus Huber, based on poems and prose texts by Osip Mandelstam

=== Orchestral works ===
- Tenebrae (1966–1967) for large orchestra
- Erniedrigt – Geknechtet – Verlassen – Verachtet... (1975/78–1983) for soloist, choir and orchestra. Text: Ernesto Cardenal, Florian Knobloch, George Jackson, Carolina Maria de Jesús, Prophet Jesaja
- Protuberanzen (simultaneous version) (1985/86) Three small pieces for orchestra
- Spes contra spem (1986–89) A contra-paradigm to "Götterdämmerung". Text: Bertolt Brecht, Elias Canetti, Georg Herwegh, Rosa Luxemburg, Friedrich Nietzsche, Reinhold Schneider, Dorothee Sölle, Richard Wagner, Peter Weiss
- Lamentationes de fine vicesimi saeculi (1992/94) for orchestra in four groups with Sufi-singer (ad libitum)
- Quod est pax? – Vers la raison du coeur... (2006/07) for orchestra with five solo voices and one Arabic percussion. Text: Jacques Derrida, Octavio Paz, Mahmoud Darwish, Klaus Huber

=== Ensemble works ===
- Des Engels Anredung an die Seele (1957) for tenor, flute, clarinet, horn, and harp. Text: Johann Georg Albini
- "Erinnere dich an G..." (1977) for double bass solo and 18 instrumentalists
- Cantiones de Circulo gyrante (1985), Space music for three groups and five single players. Text: Hildegard of Bingen, Heinrich Böll, for soloists, speaker, choir, orchestra, two conductors
- La terre des hommes In memoriam Simone Weil (1987–89) for mezzo-soprano, countertenor/speaker, and eighteen instruments. Text: Simone Weil, Ossip Mandelstam
- Die umgepflügte Zeit In memoriam Luigi Nono (1990) Space music for viola d'amore, mezzo-soprano, high tenor, female speaker, 2 mixed ensembles, choir voices and instruments. Text: Ossip Mandelstam
- Intarsi In memoriam Witold Lutosławski (1993/94) Chamber concerto for piano and 17 instruments
- Lamentationes Sacrae et Profanae ad Responsoria Iesualdi (1993/1996–97) for six singers and two instrumentalists. Text: Jeremiah, Klaus Huber, Ernesto Cardenal, Mahmoud Dowlatabadi
- L'ombre de notre âge (1998/1999) for chamber ensemble
- Die Seele muss vom Reittier steigen... (2002) for cello solo, baritone solo, countertenor (or alto) and 37 instrumentalists. Text: Mahmoud Darwish
- Miserere hominibus... (2005/2006) Cantata for seven solo voices and seven instrumentalists. Text: Psalm 51, Octavio Paz (Il Cántaro Roto), Mahmoud Darwish (Murale), Carl Améry (Global Exit), Jacques Derrida (Un très proche Orient, Paroles de paix)

=== Vocal music ===
- ...inwendig voller Figur... (1971) for choir, loudspeakers, tape, and large orchestra. Text: From Revelation and by Albrecht Dürer
- "...Ausgespannt..." / Geistliche Musik in memoriam Kurt Wolfgang Senn (1972) Sacred music in memory of Kurt Wolfgang Senn, for high baritone, five instrumental groups, percussion, organ, loudspeakers, and tape
- Kleines Requiem for Heinrich Böll (1991, excerpts from Cantiones de Circulo Gyrante) Little Requiem for Heinrich Böll, for choir a cappella and bass-baritone (ad lib.). Text: Hildegard von Bingen (in Latin)

=== Chamber music ===
- ...von Zeit zu Zeit... (1984/85) string quartet No. 2
- Des Dichters Pflug (1989) for violin, viola, and violoncello (all in three-tone tuning, Dritteltonstimmung)
- Agnus Dei cum recordatione Hommage à Jehan Okeghem (1990/91) Text: Gösta Neuwirth Hommage à Jehan Okeghem
- Ecce homines (1997/98) string quintet

=== Solo works ===
- In memoriam Willy Burkhard (1955) for organ
- La Chace (1963) for harpsichord
- To Ask the Flutist (1966) for flute
- Ein Hauch von Unzeit (1972): No. I for flute and other instruments; no. II for piano; no. V for guitar; no. VI for accordion; no. VII for double bass; no. VIII for cello
- Blätterlos (1975) for prepared piano
- Transpositio ad infinitum (1976) for cello
- ...Plainte... for Luigi Nono (1990) for viola d'amore in three-tone-tuning
- Winter Seeds (1993) for accordion
- Intarsimile (2010) for violin

== Writings ==
Publications with writings by Huber:

- Umgepflügte Zeit: Gesammelte Schriften (1999): Huber's collected writings.
- From Time – To Time: The Complete Œuvre (2010), translation of Von Zeit zu Zeit: Das Gesamtschaffen (2009): a book Huber wrote in the format of a dialogue with Claus-Steffen Mahnkopf.

== Awards and recognition ==
Huber received the Beethoven Prize (Bonn) in 1970 for Tenebrae. In 2000, he was awarded an honorary doctorate by the University of Strasbourg. In 2009, he received the Salzburg Music Prize and the Ernst von Siemens Music Prize and was awarded an honorary doctorate by the University of Music and Theatre Leipzig. In 2013, he received the German Music Authors' Prize for lifetime achievement.
