= Eteocle e Polinice =

1674 opera by Giovanni Legrenzi

- Opera by Giovanni Legrenzi
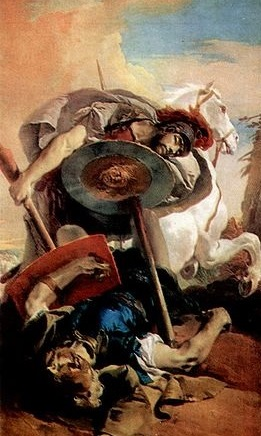
- Tiepolo's depiction of Eteocles and Polynices, the opera's protagonists
- Librettist: Tebaldo Fattorini
- Premiere: 13 December 1674; Teatro San Salvador, Venice

Eteocle e Polinice (Eteocles and Polynices) is an opera in 3 acts composed by Giovanni Legrenzi with an Italian-language libretto by Tebaldo Fattorini based on The Thebaid. The opera premiered at the Teatro San Salvador in Venice on 13 December 1674.

== Background and performance history ==
Little is known about the opera's librettist, Tebaldo Fattorini, apart from the fact that he came from a prominent family in Chioggia and was employed as a "house poet" for the Teatro San Salvador in Venice. In addition to writing Eteocle e Polinice, he also significantly revised Nicolò Minato's libretto for a new version of Cavalli's Scipione africano in 1677 and may also have revised Giovanni Giovannini's original libretto for its setting by Legrenzi as Adone in Cipro in 1675.

The libretto for the premiere performances of Eteocle e Polinice at the Teatro San Salvador in 1674 was dedicated of the "most noble ladies of Venice" ("Consacrato alle nobilissime dame di Venetia"). Subsequent productions of the opera with new dedications were staged in Naples (1689), Milan (1684), and Modena (1690). The opera consists of a total of 101 musical pieces, including arias, duets, quartets, etc. Its most well known aria, "Che fiero costume" (also known by its English title, "How void of compassion"), has been recorded by several well known opera singers, including Luciano Pavarotti, Ezio Pinza, and Richard Tucker. A manuscript score from the 1689 Neapolitan production has survived.

Richard Strauss made specific reference to this opera in Die schweigsame Frau, recomposing "Dolce Amor" as a duet which is sung in the course of the music lesson scene in act 3, as one of many such re-appropriations of pre-existing music Strauss used to create an "antique" atmosphere.

== Roles ==
- Eteocle, King of Thebes
- Polinice, Eteocle's brother
- Antigone, Eteocle and Polinice's sister
- Arbante, Antigone's tutor
- Cleante, Eteocle's confidante
- Adrasto, King of Argos
- Deifile, Adrasto's daughter, a warrior-princess
- Argia, Deifile's sister
- Silena, Argia's nurse
- Tideo, Prince of Aetolia
- Lenone, Tideo's servant
- Eteocle's soldiers, Polinice's retinue, Antigone's pages, Adrasto's archers (silent roles)

== Synopsis ==
The immediate source of the libretto was the Latin poem The Thebaid by Statius wherein despite entreaties from their sister Antigone the brothers Eteocles and Polynices went to war with each other over who should rule Thebes. It ended with the principal characters all dying tragically through murder, suicide, or grief. However, Tebaldo Fattorini's libretto has a happy ending in which Antigone is reunited with Tideo, Prince of Aetolia, and Eteocle is reunited with the warrior-princess Deifile. The victorious Adrasto, the King of Argos who had been the ally of Polynices, supervises the return to peace and harmony.
