= Maddalena Allegranti =

Italian opera singer

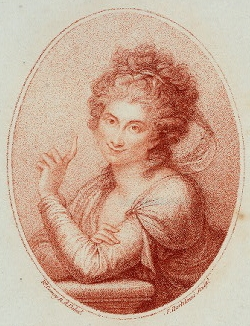
Maddalena Allegranti. Portrait by Francesco Bartolozzi after Richard Cosway.

Maddalena Allegranti (1754–1802) was an Italian soprano.

== Life and career ==
'Maddalena Allegranti was born in Venice in 1754. She was a pupil of Holtzbauer of Mannheim, and appeared for the first time at Venice in 1771. After singing at other theatres in Italy, she went in 1774 to the Holy Roman Empire, where she continued to perform at Mannheim and Ratisbon till the year 1779, when she returned to Venice. She sang there at the theatre of San Samuele during the Carnival, and eventually came to England in 1781. Here she was enthusiastically admired in her first opera, Viaggiatori felici by Pasquale Anfossi.

Her voice, though thin, was extremely sweet, of extraordinary compass upwards, and so flexible as to lead her to indulge in a flowery style of singing which had then the merit of considerable novelty. She was also a good actress. But it was soon found that there was a great sameness in her manner and embellishments, and she became gradually so disregarded, by the end of her second season, that she went to Dresden, where the Elector engaged her at a salary of a thousand ducats. She came a second time to London, many years later, and reappeared in Cimarosa's Il matrimonio segreto. Never was a more pitiable attempt; she had scarcely a thread of voice remaining nor the power to sing a note in tune: her figure and acting were equally altered for the worse, and after a few nights she was obliged to retire, and quit the stage for ever. She performed in oratorio in 1799. After 1801 her whereabouts and activities are unknown; including her date of death.

Allegranti died in Ireland in 1802.
