= Il figlio delle selve =

Il Figlio delle selve is an opera in three acts by Ignaz Holzbauer to a libretto by Carlo Sigismondo Capece premiering in June 1753 at the Schlosstheater Schwetzingen for Kurfürst Carl Theodor zu Mannheim, securing Holzbauer employment as kapellmeister. The opera was revived by Staats Theater Mainz for the Schwetzingen Festival 2003, and again for the Festival de Radio France et Montpellier Languedoc Roussillon in July 2005.
