= Tito Ceccherini =

Italian conductor

- Born: 1973 (age 51–52)
- Occupation: Conductor

Tito Ceccherini (born 1973) is an Italian conductor with a focus on opera, and an interest in modern repertoire. He has performed at major opera houses in Europe, leading several world premieres.

== Career ==
Ceccherini was born in Milan and studied in his hometown.

He conducted world premieres, including Sciarrino's Da gelo a gelo at the Schwetzingen Festival in 2006, Philippe Fénelon's La Cerisaie at the Bolshoi Theatre in Moscow in 2010, and Sciarrino's Superflumina at the Nationaltheater Mannheim in 2011.

At the Oper Frankfurt, he conducted Janáček's Aus einem Totenhaus, Stravinsky's The Rake’s Progress, Bellini's I puritani and the world premiere of Lucia Ronchetti's Inferno in 2021.
