= Veremonda =

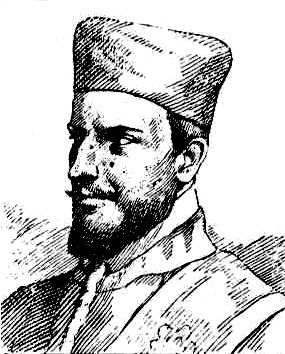
Francesco Cavalli

Veremonda, l'amazzone di Aragona (Veremonda, the Amazon of Aragon; also known as Il Delio) is an opera in three acts and a prologue by the Italian composer Francesco Cavalli. The libretto is by Giulio Cicognini with revisions by Giulio Strozzi. The date of the Venetian performance is uncertain.

== Performance history ==
The Venetian libretto indicates 28 January 1652 but this could refer also to 1653 if the Venetian calendar applied (where the new year began on March 1). The opera was also performed at the Nuovo Teatro del Palazzo Reale in Naples on 21 December 1652, to celebrate the Spanish capture of Barcelona, which put an end to the revolt of Catalonia (Naples was also a Spanish possession).

== Roles in the Venetian libretto ==
Role	Voice type	Premiere Cast, December 21, 1652 (Conductor: - )
Il Sole (the Sun)	contralto	
Il Crepuscolo (Twilight)	tenor	
Zelemina, Queen of the Moors	soprano	
Zaida, her nurse	soprano	
Delio, the General to King Alfonso	contralto	
Zeriffo, sailor and soldier to Delio	tenor	
Don Alfonso, King of Aragon	contralto	
Roldano, Delio's father	bass	
Don Buscone, the court jester	tenor	
Veremonda, Queen of Aragon	soprano	
Vespina, Veremonda's maid	soprano	
La Vendetta (Revenge)	soprano	
Amore (Love)	soprano	
Furore (Fury)	contralto	
Sergente Maggiore, sergeant major of Veremonda's amazon army	bass/soprano	
Giacutte, Captain of the Guard to Zelemina	bass	

Note: the Neapolitan libretto presents divergencies from the Venetian libretto including a different prologue (La Musica, La Poesia and L'Architettura) and an alternative name for Vespina (Callidia).

== Modern Performances and Editions ==
The first performance since the mid-17th century was on 23 May 2015 for the Spoleto Festival USA in Charleston, Virginia, US. The conductor and musicologist Aaron Carpenè prepared the score from the manuscript conserved in the Marciana Library in Venice. The staging was by the Italian director Stefano Vizioli and the sets and costumes by the Italian contemporary artist Ugo Nespolo. A subsequent production at the 2016 Schwetzingen Festival used a newly drafted critical edition by Wendy Heller, published by Bärenreiter in 2025.

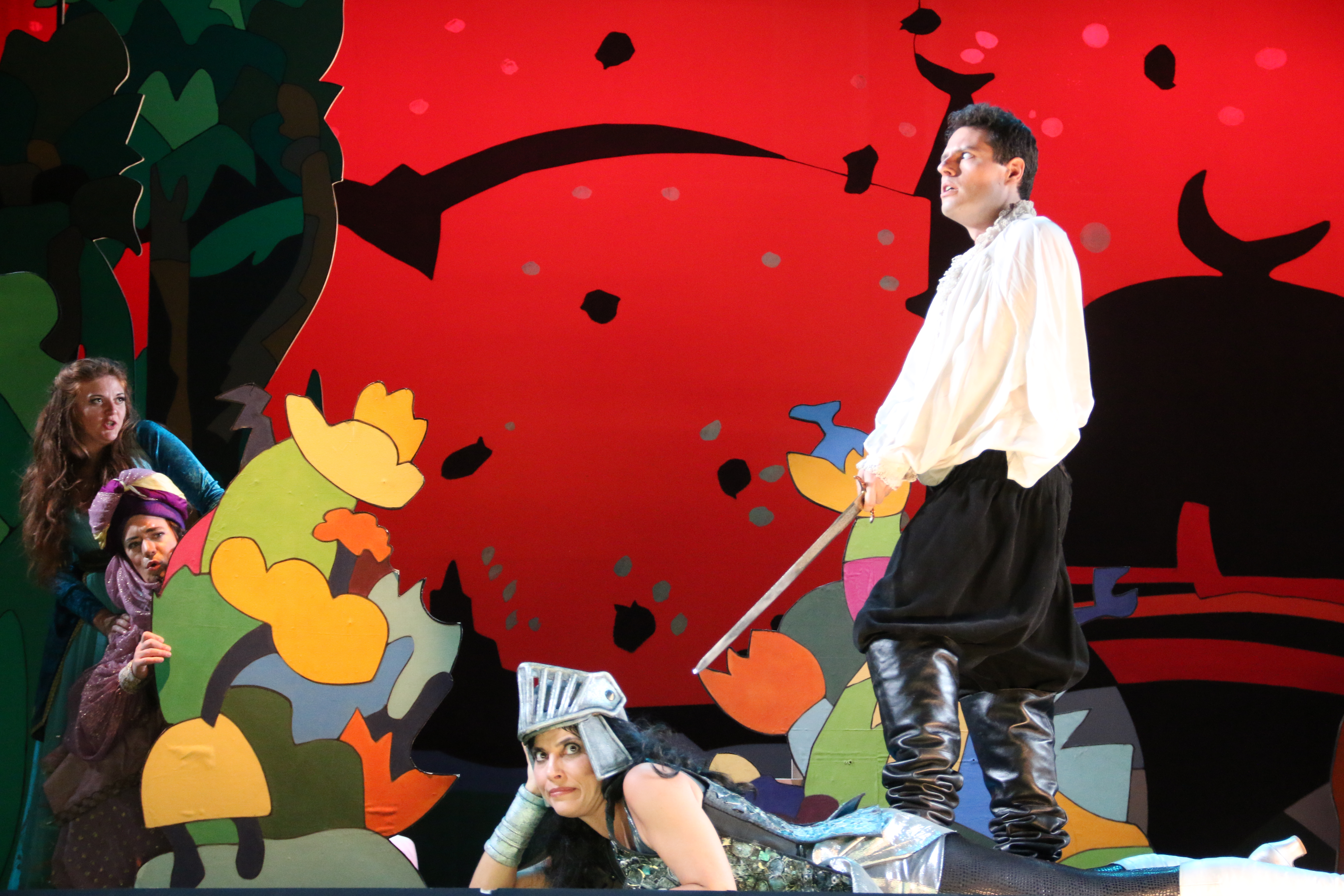
Delio molests Queen Veremonda to the amazement of Queen Zelemina and Zaida.

== Synopsis ==
The story takes place in Gibraltar during the siege of the Moorish fort of Calpe by the Spanish army. The atmosphere is set in the Prologue by Twilight exhorting the audience to enjoy the evening entertainments while the setting Sun warns the ladies that unlike dawn’s renewed beauty, their own splendour is destined to fade.

Queen Veremonda is perplexed at the continual delay of the assault on the enemy fortress. The motive, unknown to her, is that the young and handsome general of the Spanish army Delio is having a secret love affair with the Moorish queen Zelemina. The two lovers, with the help of their respective servants meet every night in the woods by the citadel. Veremonda discovers the deceit and gathers around her the ladies of the court. She commands them to abandon petticoats and amorous pursuits and join her amazonian army. They are to be trained for battle against the enemy. Veremonda has two motives for assuming military command. Firstly she must react against her husband King Alfonso’s indifference to the task at hand. He is dedicated to the pursuit of scientific studies which keep him distracted from his military and conjugal duties. Secondly, and perhaps most importantly, the proud queen wants to oppose Delio who, having sworn loyalty to the Spanish crown, has defiantly betrayed his country through his treasonous affair with the enemy queen. Attired as a soldier and having convinced Delio to take her to study the citadel walls in order to understand how to attack them, Veremonda however has not reckoned with the darkness of the night and the remote forest that rouse the young general’s erotic appetite. While still in love with his fair Moorish queen, he is inflamed by the prospect of conquering his own queen through love or by force. Veremonda unconvincingly succeeds in delaying Delio’s pressing advances and urges him to enter into the fortress together thanks to a ring given to him by Zelemina that gives free access. Queen Zelemina joyously welcomes her lover but is also charmed by the graces of his young companion. Indeed, she considers ‘him’ more handsome and attractive than Delio. Despite the doubts of the lady-in-waiting Zaida who has guessed the true identity of Delio’s ‘friend’, the queen leaves the two youths to entertain themselves in the beautiful gardens of the citadel while she, her court and the army must leave to attend a religious celebration. During the Moors’ absence, Veremonda opens the door of the citadel to the Spanish army and her Amazons who, penetrating the enemy camp and encircling the fortress, conquer the enemy. The final scene celebrates the Spanish victory and the nuptial union between Delio and the converted Zelemina.

== Recordings ==
- Atto III Scena 6 "Tardano molto? - Qui si fa il ballo de' tori" / "Che rumori, che voci - Qui se replica il ballo de' tori" Cappella Mediterranea, Leonardo García Alarcón, Clematis, Mariana Flores, Anna Reinhold
- "Né meste più" Giulia Semenzato (soprano), Raffaele Pe (alto) La Venexiana Claudio Cavina 2015
