= Salzburg Music Prize =

Austrian music award

Salzburg Music Prize Musikpreis Salzburg
- Awarded for: "the life work of one of the outstanding composers of our time"
- Location: Salzburg
- Country: Austria
- Rewards: €60,000 and €20,000
- First award: 2006
- Final award: 2013

The Salzburg Music Prize (German: Musikpreis Salzburg) was an international composition prize awarded by the state government of Salzburg. The total prize money was €80,000 (€60,000 for the main prize and €20,000 for the advancement award or encouragement prize). The prize was first awarded in the Mozart Year 2006. The award honours the life work of one of the outstanding composers of our time. From the second time in 2009, it was awarded biennially.

== Recipients ==
- 2006 Salvatore Sciarrino, Francesco Filidei
- 2009 Klaus Huber, Christoph Yeznikian
- 2011 Friedrich Cerha, Elena Mendoza
- 2013 Georg Friedrich Haas, Aureliano Cattaneo
