= Schwetzingen Festival =

Music festival

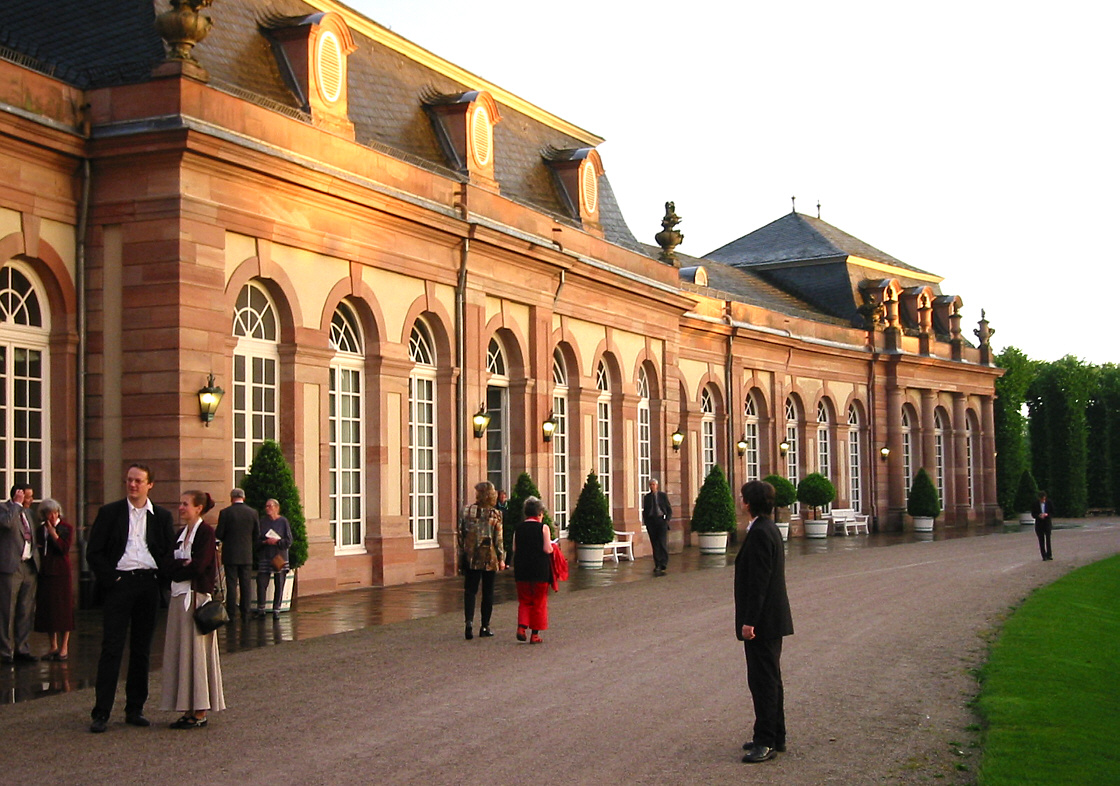
Schwetzingen Festival, during a concert intermission.

The Schwetzingen Festival (German: Schwetzinger Festspiele, now Schwetzinger SWR Festspiele) is an early summer festival of opera and other classical music presented each year from May to early June in Schwetzingen, Germany.

In 1952, the broadcaster Süddeutscher Rundfunk founded the festival in the Schwetzingen area. It is located in a beautiful 250-year-old palace and park, Schwetzingen Castle, near the famous city of Heidelberg. The main venue is the historic Schlosstheater Schwetzingen. Nowadays, the successor organization is the Südwestrundfunk (SWR) and it organises many international concerts and music theatre events every year.

== List of major premieres and rediscoveries ==
One of the festival's characteristics is the world premiere of a new opera, as well as at least one rediscovered opera from former centuries, performed on period instruments.

Year	World premieres	Early rarities
2000	Karl-Wieland Kurz: gute miene böses spiel	Giovanni Legrenzi: La divisione del mondo
2001	Manuel Hidalgo: Bacon 1561–1992	Joseph Haydn: L'anima del filosofo
2002	Salvatore Sciarrino: Macbeth	Georg Benda: Il buon marito
2003	Frederik Zeller: Irma Vep	Ignaz Holzbauer: Il figlio delle selve
2004	Adriana Hölszky: Der gute Gott von Manhattan	Giovanni Paisiello: Il re Teodoro in Venezia
2005	Frederik Zeller: Zaubern	Alessandro Scarlatti: Telemaco
2006	Salvatore Sciarrino: Kälte (Da gelo a gelo)	Joseph Martin Kraus: Proserpina in German
2007	Bernhard Lang: Der Alte vom Berge	Giovanni Legrenzi: Il Giustino
2008	Adriana Hölszky: Hybris/Niobe	Agostino Steffani: Niobe, regina di Tebe
2009	Wolfgang Rihm: Proserpina	George Frideric Handel: Ezio
2010	Michael Jarrell: Le Père	André Grétry: Andromaque
2011	Georg Friedrich Haas: Bluthaus	Christoph Willibald Gluck: Telemaco
2012	Enno Poppe: IQ. Testbatterie	Anton Schweitzer: Rosamunde
2013	Georg Friedrich Haas: Thomas	Tommaso Traetta: Ifigenia in Tauride
2014	Bernhard Lang: Reigen	Johann Adolph Hasse: Leucippo 1747
2015	Hèctor Parra: Wilde	Leonardo Vinci: Didone abbandonata, (pasticcio by Handel)
2016	Georg Friedrich Haas: Koma	Francesco Cavalli: Veremonda, l’amazzone di aragona 1652
2017	Annette Schlünz: Tre Volti – Drei Blicke auf Liebe und Krieg	Nicola Porpora: Mitridate

== Concerts ==
Concerts have featured well-known artists such as Gidon Kremer, Jorge Bolet and Cecilia Bartoli, as well as young artists at the start of their careers. Singers of the caliber of Barbara Hendricks, Fritz Wunderlich and Teresa Berganza have performed at the festival as beginners and have all gone on to major careers.

== See also ==
- List of opera festivals
