= Howard Mayer Brown =

American musicologist (1930–1993)

Howard Mayer Brown (April 13, 1930 – February 20, 1993) was an American musicologist.

Brown obtained his BA from Harvard in 1951 and his Ph.D. in 1959, studying under Walter Piston and Otto Gombosi among others. He conducted and performed on flute often as a graduate student. He taught at Wellesley College, 1958–60, and then at the University of Chicago from 1960, where he became chair of the music department in 1970. In 1972 he became professor at King's College in London, but returned to Chicago in 1974. Brown was editor of Renaissance Music in Facsimile, published 1977–1982, and was the general editor of several other monument series of musical editions. He contributed prolifically to the New Grove Dictionary of Music and Musicians. He served as president of the American Musicological Society, 1978–80.

Brown's scholarship covered a wide range of subjects. He published on the music of the Renaissance, especially the chanson and instrumental music, and frequently returned to problems in historical performance practice, a subfield in which he was one of the most important commentators. His work Musical Iconography (1972) was an important study of the depictions of musical instruments in the visual arts. He also made contributions to the study of Baroque opera.

The Howard Mayer Brown fellowships of the American Musicological Society were established his honor on the occasion of his sixtieth birthday. Each fellowship supports a year of graduate studies for a member of a group historically underrepresented in musicology.

== Books ==
- Music in the French Secular Theater, 1400–1550 (dissertation Harvard U., 1959; publ. Cambridge, Massachusetts, 1963)
- Instrumental Music Printed Before 1600: a Bibliography (Cambridge, Massachusetts, 1965)
- (with J. Lascelle) Musical Iconography: a Manual for Cataloguing Musical Subjects in Western Art before 1800 (Cambridge, Massachusetts, 1972)
- Sixteenth-Century Instrumentation: the Music for the Florentine Intermedii (1973)
- Embellishing Sixteenth-Century Music (London, 1976)
- Music in the Renaissance (Englewood Cliffs, New Jersey, 1976)
- (ed. with Stanley Sadie) Performance Practice, i: Music before 1600 (London, 1989); ii: Music after 1600 (1989)
