= The Early Music Company =

The Early Music Company is a publishing house specializing in music of the 17th and 18th centuries.

== Background ==
The Early Music Company was created in 2008 when the catalogue of King's Music was bought after fraudulent photocopier salesmen bankrupted the latter company. Clifford and Elaine Bartlett had established King's Music in 1984, their first titles being a facsimile series of English trio sonatas. Having graduated from Magdalene College, Cambridge, Clifford had worked as a music librarian for the BBC and during that period already begun to support the nascent Early Music movement by suggesting programmes to producers and supplying scores that he had made by hand from original printed part-books. With the advent of music typesetting software (he happened to know Philip Hazel, who had devised a programme that was ideally suited to such repertoire) and an introduction in 1985 by Peter Holman to Brian Clark, a recent graduate of St Andrews University with interests in editing and publishing music, the catalogue soon grew. Brian's ability to read old notations and edit "on the hoof" perfectly complemented Clifford's classical education and interest in poetry as well as music and experience as a music librarian made them the ideal team: after Brian had typeset an initial impression of each work, Clifford (and sometimes others) would edit it, Brian would incorporate the changes and then Clifford would lay the music out in what he thought the best way for practical musicians.

Monteverdi's Vespers of 1610 and all three of his operas were followed by editions of Purcell's "Dido and Aeneas", Blow's "Venus and Adonis" (which Clifford had previously written out by hand), and Charpentier's "Médée". Clifford produced a putative recreation of a Mass for Christmas featuring music by Praetorius for a recording by Paul McCreesh and Deutsche Grammophon in 1994. In the following year, Max Sobel typeset Clifford and Peter Holman's new edition of Purcell's "King Arthur" for the Boston Early Music Festival, and two years later another commission came from the same festival: the world modern premiere of Luigi Rossi's "Orfeo" The Vespers edition, which was produced for the recording by Andrew Parrott and The Taverner Consort, presented the music according to the "chiavette" theory of transposing the music down, depending on the combination of clefs in the parts. Similarly, Clifford's edition of "L'Orfeo" features transposed versions of the infernal choruses. Alan Hacker collaborated with Clifford on a re-scoring of Monteverdi's "Il ritorno d'Ulisse" which the former directed from the clarinet in Staatsoper Stuttgart in 1992. Brian and Clifford produced an edition of Biber's "Missa Bruxellensis" for the BBC prom in the 300th anniversary year of the composer's death (2004).

Although Clifford died in 2019, his editions continue to be used throughout the world. His "L'Orfeo" will be given this year at the Staatstheater Hannover and at Longborough Festival Opera. Purcell's "The Fairy Queen" will feature in the season at Drottningholm and Longborough. The company continues to supply performing materials to opera companies around the world, and to produce new Urtext performing editions, among them a Corelli concerto grosso that survives in a number of manuscript sources, Vivaldi's concerto in G minor RV15 and Handel's "Laudate pueri" HWV236.
