= Ignaz Holzbauer =

German composer (1711–1783)

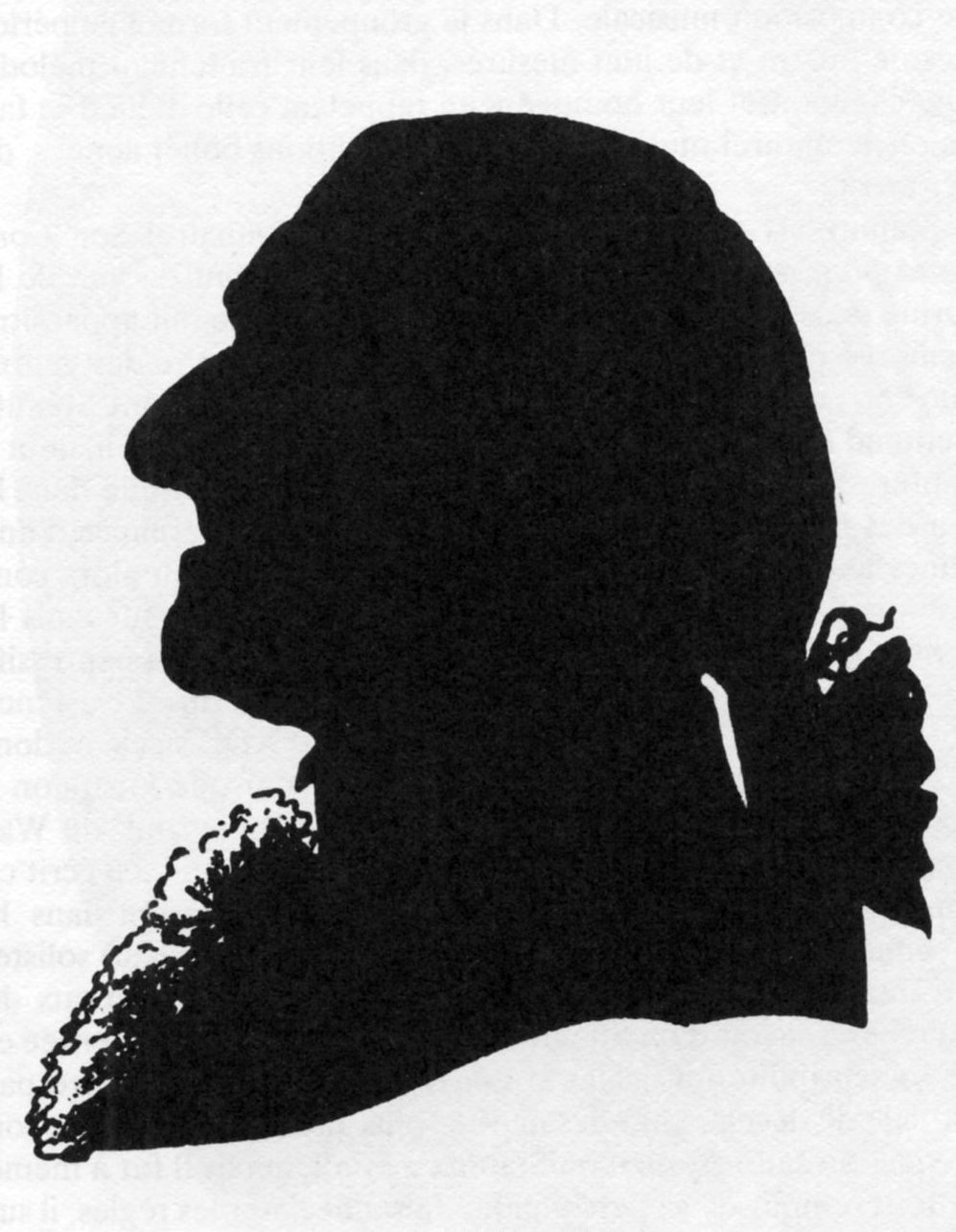

Ignaz Jakob Holzbauer (18 September 1711 – 7 April 1783) was an Austrian composer of symphonies, concertos, operas, and chamber music, and a member of the Mannheim school. His aesthetic style is in line with that of the Sturm und Drang movement of German art and literature.

== Biography ==
Holzbauer was born in Vienna. Despite the opposition of his parents, who intended him for the law, he studied music, and in 1745 became Kapellmeister to Count Rottal and at the Court Theatre of Vienna. Later he was Kapellmeister at Stuttgart, Germany. His operas include Il figlio delle selve, which was the opening performance of the Schlosstheater Schwetzingen in 1753. Its success led to a job offer from the court at Mannheim, Germany, where he stayed for the rest of his life, continuing to compose and teach, his students including Johann Anton Friedrich Fleischmann (1766–1798), the pianist, and Carl Stamitz. Holzbauer died in Mannheim, having been entirely deaf for some years.

His opera Günther von Schwarzburg, based on the life of the eponymous king, was an early German national opera, a performance of which Mozart and his sister attended, during which they met Anton Raaff, who was later to premiere a role in Mozart's Idomeneo. This opera has recently been recorded on the label cpo. Holzbauer wrote 196 symphonies in total.

Mozart also composed nine numbers for insertion in a Miserere by Holzbauer on commission by the Parisian Concert Spirituel in 1778, but they have been lost. They have been given the catalog number K. 297a in the list of Mozart's works.

== Operas ==
- Lucio Papirio (dramma per musica, libretto by Apostolo Zeno, 1737, Holleschau)
- Sesostri, re d'Egitto (dramma per musica, libretto by Zeno, 1738, Holleschau)
- Vologeso (dramma per musica, libretto by Zeno, 1739, Holleschau)
- Hypermnestra (German opera, libretto by Johann Leopold van Ghelen, 1741, Vienna)
- La fata meravigliosa (dramma giocoso per musica, 1748, Vienna)
- Il figlio delle selve (favola pastorale per musica, libretto by Carlo Sigismondo Capece, 1753, Schwetzingen)
- L'isola disabitata (azione per musica, libretto by Pietro Metastasio, 1754, Schwetzingen)
- L'Isspile (dramma per musica, libretto by Metastasio, 1754, Mannheim)
- Il Don Chisciotte (opera semiridicola, libretto by Zeno, 1755, Schwetzingen)
- I cinesi (componimento drammatico per musica, libretto by Metastasio and Mattia Verazi, 1756, Schwetzingen)
- Le nozze d'Arianna (festa teatrale per musica, libretto by Verazi, 1756, Schwetzingen)
- La clemenza di Tito (dramma per musica, libretto by Metastasio and Verazi, 1757, Mannheim)
- Nitteti (dramma per musica, libretto by Metastasio, 1758, Mannheim)
- Alessandro nell'Indie (dramma per musica, libretto by Metastasio, 1759, Milan)
- Ippolito ed Aricia (dramma per musica, libretto by Carlo Innocenzo Frugoni and Verazi, 1759, Mannheim)
- Günther von Schwarzburg (singspiel, libretto by Anton von Klein, 1777, Mannheim)
- La morte di Didone (revised as Tod der Dido) (singspiel, based on a libretto by Metastasio, 1779, Mannheim)
- Tancredi (dramma per musica, 1783, Monaco)

== Orchestral works (partial list) ==
- Flute Concerto in A major
- Flute Concerto in E minor
- Flute Concerto No. 1 in D major
- Flute Concerto No. 2 in D major
- Oboe Concerto in D minor
- Symphony in D minor
- Symphony in G major
- Symphony in A major, Op. 2, No. 4
- Symphony in E♭ major, Op. 3, No. 1
- Symphony in D major, Op. 3, No. 4

== Choral Works (partial list) ==
- Missa in C major
- Missa Brevissima

== Pupils ==
- Maddalena Allegranti (1754–1829), opera singer

== Furher reading ==
- "Announcement" of a 1972 concert with a sinfonia concertante by Holzbauer, performed by Lucerne Festival Strings conducted by Rudolf Baumgartner
- "Brief biography", hoasm.org
