= Lohengrin (Sciarrino) =

- Opera by Salvatore Sciarrino
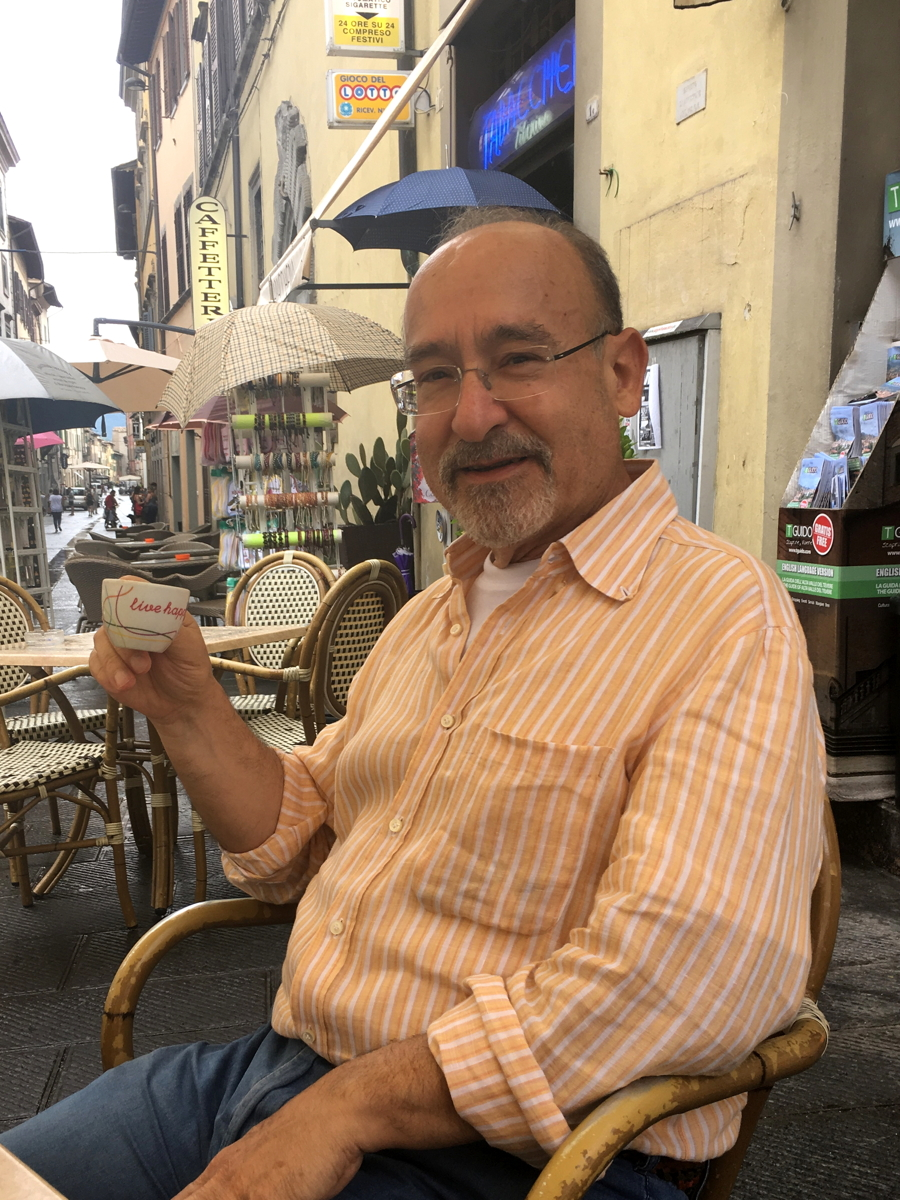
- The composer in 2016. He called his work an Azione invisibile.
- Language: Italian
- Premiere: 1982; Milan

Lohengrin (Azione invisibile per solista, strumenti e voci) is an operatic monodrama by the Italian composer Salvatore Sciarrino. Premiered in 1982 in Milan the work was later revised by Sciarrino and the new version was premiered in on 9 September 1984 in Catanzaro. The opera, which is less than an hour long, is loosely based on Jules Laforgue's 1887 parody of Wagner's opera of the same name, published as part of his Moralités légendaires.

== Roles ==
- Soprano
- Tenor
- Baritone
- Bass
- Male chorus
- Speakers

== Plot ==
The story of Sciarrino's Lohengrin is seen from the point of view of Elsa, a Vestal Virgin who is accused of fornication. Lohengrin marries Elsa, but on their wedding night, despite Elsa's attempts to seduce him, he refuses to consummate the marriage. Eventually one of the pillows changes into a swan and Lohengrin returns to the moon on its back. The opera ends with the revelation that Elsa is actually a patient in a psychiatric ward.

== Recording ==
Sciarrino: Lohengrin – Gruppo Strumentale Musica d'Oggi

- Conductor: Salvatore Sciarrino
- Principal singers: Daisy Lumini
- Release date: March 11, 2008
- Label: Stradivarius (CD)

Sciarrino: Lohengrin – Ensemble Risognanze

- Conductor: Tito Ceccherini
- Principal singers: Marianne Pousseur
- Release date: August 18, 2005
- Label: Collegno (CD)
