= Da gelo a gelo =

Opera by Salvatore Sciarrino

- Opera by Salvatore Sciarrino
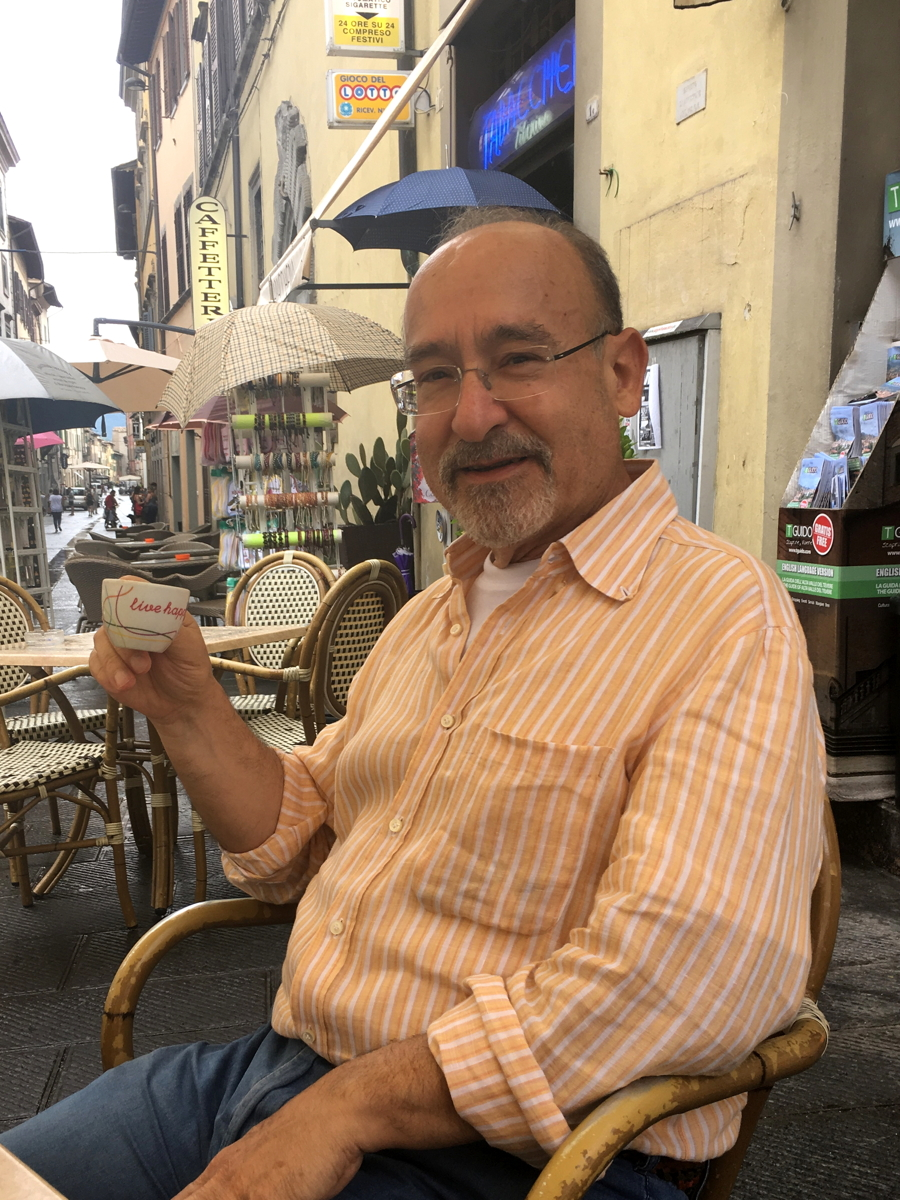
- The composer in 2016
- Translation: From one frost to the next; Kälte
- Librettist: Sciarrino
- Language: Italian
- Based on: 65 poems by Izumi Shikibu
- Premiere: 21 May 2006 (in German); Schlosstheater Schwetzingen

Da gelo a gelo ("From one frost to the next") is an opera in 100 scenes (some lasting as little as 3') by Salvatore Sciarrino. The composer's Italian libretto is based on one year (1002–03) and 65 poems from the journal of Izumi Shikibu encompassing her affair with Prince Atsumishi.

The opera was a co-commission of the Schwetzingen Festival, the Grand Théâtre de Genève and the Opéra National de Paris and premiered in the Schlosstheater Schwetzingen under the German title Kälte on 21 May 2006. The choreography for the singers by Trisha Brown was retained for the 2007 Paris production at the Palais Garnier. The piece lasts 110 minutes.

== Roles ==
Role	Voice type	Premiere Cast (Conductor: Tito Ceccherini)
Izumi	soprano	Anna Radziejewska
The Prince's nurse/ Izumi's maid	mezzo-soprano	Ulrike Mayer
Izumi's page	contraltino	Felix Uehlein
The Prince's page	counter-tenor	Michael Hofmeister
The Prince	baritone	Otto Katzameier

== Instrumentation ==
The instrumentation is S, Ms, 2 Ct, Bar / 3 (II Fl.c in Sol, III Fl.b). 3 (III C.i). 3 (III Cl.b). 2 / 2. 3. 2. -. / Perc / strings (min. 10. 8. 6. 4. 4.)
