= Macbeth (Sciarrino) =

2002 opera by Salvatore Sciarrino

Macbeth: tre atti senza nome is an opera by Salvatore Sciarrino that received its premiere in Frankfurt in 2002 in a production by Achim Freyer. Although the work is based on endless permutation of a few simple recitation-figures, Sciarrino worked on the opera for 25 years.

== Recording ==
- Otto Katzameier, Macbeth, Anna Radziejewska, Lady Macbeth, Richard Zook, Banquo/Ghost/Attendant, Sonia Turchetta, Soldier/Banquo's Son/Murderer/Messenger, Thomas Mehnert, Duncan/Gentleman/Macduff. Vokalensemble NOVA Klangforum Wien, cond. Evan Christ, Col Legno 2CDs
