= Dorothea Wendling =

German operatic soprano

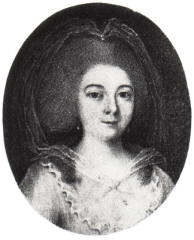
Dorothea Wendling

(Maria) Dorothea Wendling, née Spurni (21 March 1736 – 20 August 1811) was a German soprano. Born in Stuttgart, she is remembered for being the singer for whom Mozart wrote the role of Ilia in Idomeneo, re di Creta. In Mannheim, she also created the roles of Giunia in Niccolò Jommelli's and Mattia Verazi's Caio Fabrizio (1760), the title roles in Tommaso Traetta's Sofonisba (1762) and Gian Francesco de Majo's Ifigenia in Tauride (1764), both on librettos by Verazi, as well as Cleofide in de Majo's Alessandro (1766, on a libretto by Pietro Metastasio), Emirena in Ignaz Holzbauer's Adriano en Siria (1768, Metastasio), Marzia in Niccolò Piccinni's Catone in Utica (1770, Metastasio), Aspasia in Johann Christian Bach's Temistocle (1772, Metastasio), Giunia in his Lucio Silla (1775, libretto by Giovanni de Gamerra) and the title role in Holzbauer's La morte di Didone (1779, Metastasio).

In 1752 she married flautist and composer Johann Baptist Wendling. They had a daughter, Elisabeth Augusta (1752–1794). Her sister-in-law was Elisabeth Wendling (1746–1786). Dorothea Wendling died in Munich.

== Appearances in modern opera ==
Dorothea Wendling is a character in an opera about Anton Raaff and Wolfgang Amadeus Mozart (M. in the opera) composed by Dutch composer Robin de Raaff in the first years of this Millennium. The title of the opera is RAAFF and is centred around the problematic but creative relationship between Raaff and M. at the time of the world premiere of Mozart's Idomeneo at the court of Munich. The character Dorothea is a catalyst in this growing tension between the two main male characters. The opera is scores for 6 singers, an actor, mixed chorus, and symphony orchestra (including the special instruments like a fretless bass guitar, a Fender Rhodes, and a drum kit). The opera was premiered in 2004 and commissioned by the Dutch National Opera and the Holland Festival. The role of Dorothea Wendling was performed by Australian-American lyric soprano Danielle de Niese. The world premiere performances took place in the Westergasfabriek in Amsterdam. The opera was directed by Pierre Audi to whom the opera is dedicated. A directorial registsration is available on YouTube.
