= Idomeneo =

1781 opera by W. A. Mozart

Idomeneo, re di Creta ossia Ilia e Idamante
- Opera by W. A. Mozart
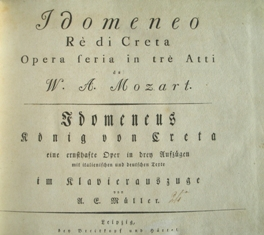
- Front page of a bilingual vocal score
- Librettist: Giambattista Varesco
- Language: Italian
- Based on: Antoine Danchet's Idoménée
- Premiere: 29 January 1781; Cuvilliés Theatre, Munich

Idomeneo, re di Creta ossia Ilia e Idamante (Italian for Idomeneus, King of Crete, or, Ilia and Idamante; usually referred to simply as Idomeneo, K. 366) is an Italian-language opera seria by Wolfgang Amadeus Mozart. The libretto was adapted by Giambattista Varesco from a French text by Antoine Danchet, based on a 1705 play by Crébillion père, which had been set to music by André Campra as Idoménée in 1712. Mozart and Varesco were commissioned in 1780 by Karl Theodor, Elector of Bavaria for a court carnival. He probably chose the subject, though it may have been Mozart. The work premiered on 29 January 1781 at the Cuvilliés Theatre in Munich, Germany.

== Composition ==
The libretto clearly draws inspiration from Metastasio in its overall layout, the type of character development, and the highly poetic language used in the various numbers and the secco and stromentato recitatives. The style of the choruses, marches, and ballets is very French, and the shipwreck scene towards the end of act 1 is almost identical to the structure and dramatic working-out of a similar scene in Gluck's Iphigénie en Tauride. The sacrifice and oracle scenes are similar to Gluck's Iphigénie en Aulide and Alceste.

Kurt Kramer has suggested that Varesco was familiar with Calzabigi and therefore the work of Gluck, especially the latter's Alceste; much of what we see in Varesco's most dramatic passages is the latest French style, mediated by Calzabigi. It is thanks to Mozart, though, that this mixture of French styles (apart from a few choruses) moves away from Gluck and France and returns to its more Italian (opera seria) roots; the singers were all trained in the classical Italian style, after all, and the recitatives are all classically Italian.

== Ballet music, K. 367 ==
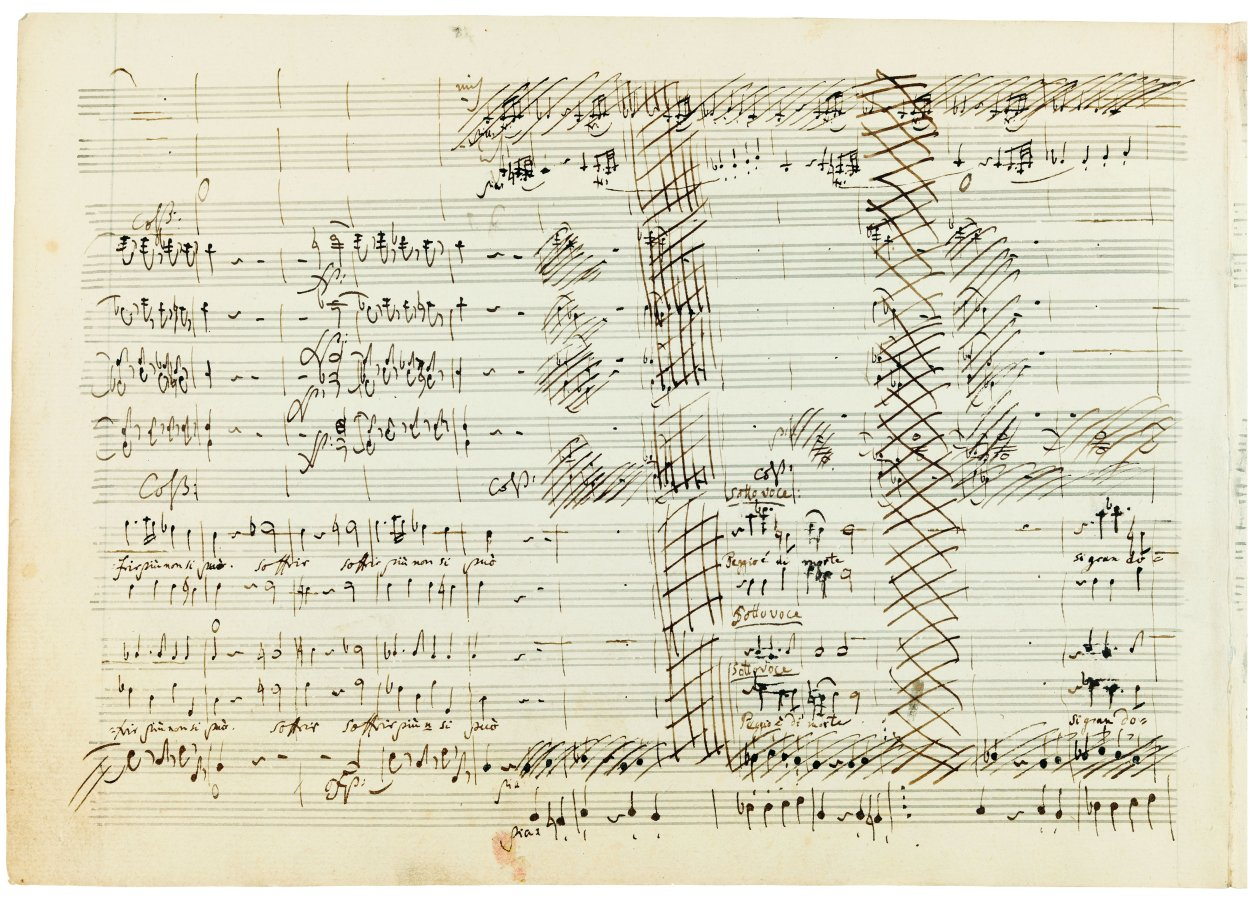
Page from Mozart's original score for Idomeneo, showing cancellations

As per French tradition, the opera uses ballet to its advantage. Mozart wrote one to be performed in the opera (K. 367), which he reported in a letter to his father of 30 December 1780 was supposed to be a divertissement requested by the management of the electoral theater in Munich. It is in several parts and lasts around fifteen minutes.

The structure is as follows. The first four dances transition into each other, while the last three are separate.

1. Chaconne (Allegro) in D major, 3/4
2. Annonce (Larghetto) in B♭ major, 3/4
3. Chaconne qui reprenda (Allegro, starts in D minor, then goes to D major), 3/4
4. Pas seul (Largo) in D major — Allegretto (attacca), 3/4 — Piu Allegro (attacca), 3/4 — Piu allegro (attacca), 3/4
5. Passepied in B♭ major, 3/8
6. Gavotte in G major, 2/2
7. Passacaille in E♭ major, 3/4 (unfinished)

The ballet is scored for the opera's full orchestra of flutes, oboes, clarinets (only present in the passacaille), bassoons, horns, trumpets, timpani, and strings. It showcases the many famous techniques of the Mannheim orchestra, including stupefying crescendos and tutti passages. Throughout the manuscript, Mozart wrote the dancers who would be partaking in a specific section of the ballet; id est, "Pas seul de Mad. Falgera", or "Pas seul de Mr. [Jean-Pierre] Le Grand", who was the main choreographer for the opera's Munich premiere.

It is unclear exactly where Mozart had intended the divertissement to occur in the opera. In the Neue Mozart-Ausgabe, Harald Heckmann suggests that it was performed after the first act, but Daniel Heartz states that it must have been performed after the final chorus of the third and last act, citing the majesty and pomposity of the D major Pas seul, perfect for concluding an opera.

Along with the Chaconne up to the Pas seul, which form a consistent whole via attacca transitions, the manuscript is bound with three other dances; a passepied in B♭, a gavotte in G (which is rather famous; Tchaikovsky conducted it at one of his Russian Musical Society concerts), and an unfinished passacaille in E♭. Due to the separation from the first half of the ballet, as well as the incomplete status of them, Daniel Heartz speculates that they were simply never performed.

Gluck's influence on Mozart is demonstrated as the Chaconne begins with a musical quotation from Gluck's ballet from Iphigénie en Aulide.

== Performance history ==
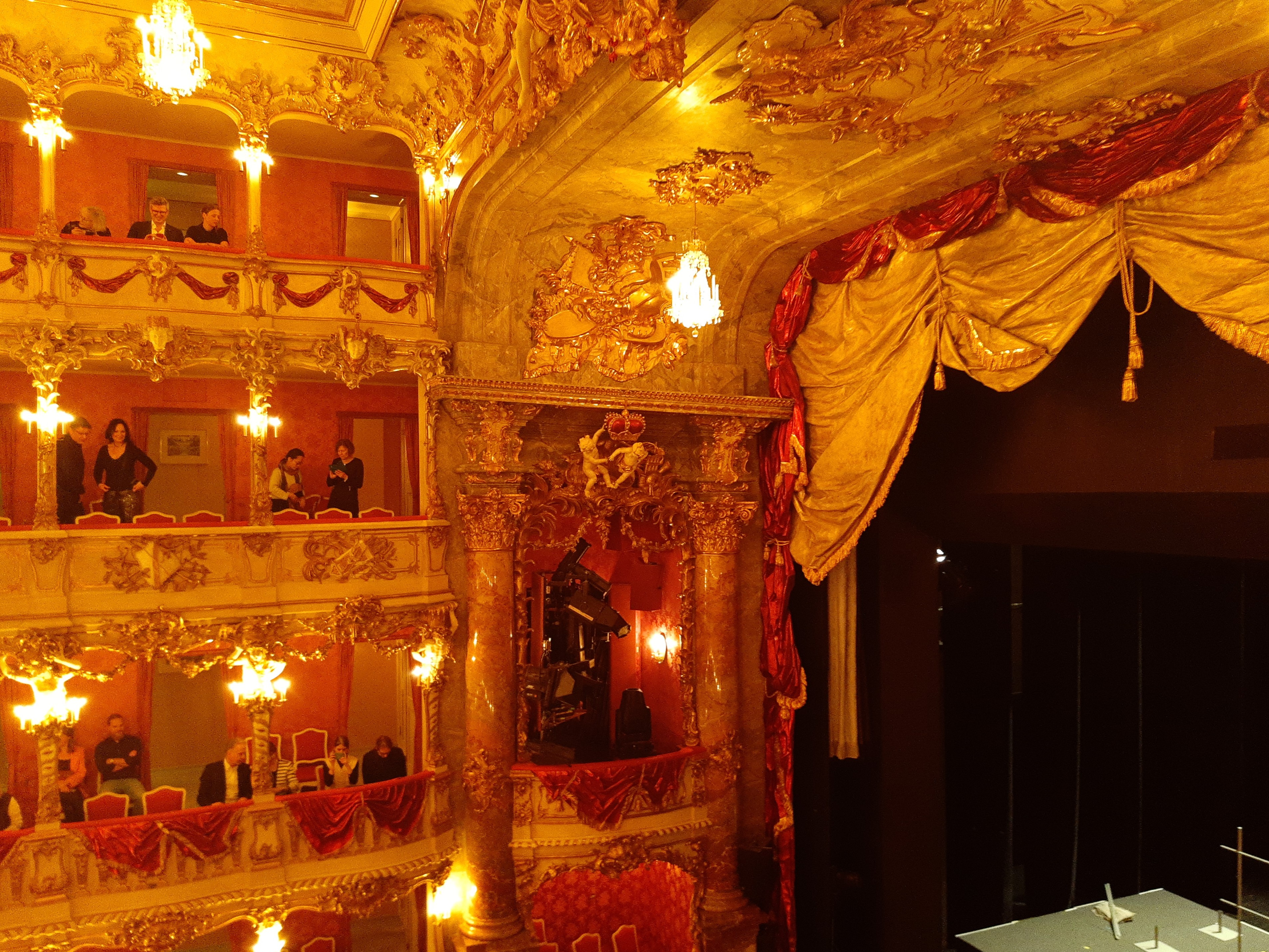
Cuvilliés Theatre in 2023, after restoration

It was first performed at the Cuvilliés Theatre of the Munich Residenz on 29 January 1781, under the musical direction of Christian Cannabich. The opera apparently owed much of its success at its first performance to the set designs: a notice in the Munich press did not mention Mozart by name but said (translation): "The author, composer and translator are all natives of Salzburg; the decors, among which the view of the port and Neptune's temple were outstanding, were masterpieces by our renowned theatre designer, court Councillor Lorenzo Quaglio, and everyone admired them tremendously." Idomeneo was Mozart's first mature opera, in which he – unique among composers – for the first time and continuing this for all his subsequent operas, ended the work in the key of the overture. With Idomeneo, he demonstrated a mastery of orchestral color, accompanied recitatives, and melodic line. Mozart fought with the librettist, the court chaplain Varesco, making large cuts and changes, even down to specific words and vowels disliked by the singers (too many "i"s in "rinvigorir", which in Italian are pronounced as in bee).

Idomeneo was performed three times in Munich. Later in 1781 Mozart considered (but did not put into effect) revisions that would have brought the work closer into line with Gluck's style; this would have meant a bass Idomeneo and a tenor Idamante.

A concert performance was given in 1786 at the Palais Auersperg in Vienna. For this, Mozart wrote some new music, made some cuts, and changed Idamante from a castrato to a tenor.

The British premiere was given by the amateur Glasgow Grand Opera Society under Erik Chisholm on 12 March 1934. The first performance in the United States was produced by Boris Goldovsky at the Berkshire Music Festival at Tanglewood during the summer of 1947.

Today Idomeneo is part of the standard operatic repertoire. There are several recordings of it (see below), and it is regularly performed.

In 2006 there was a controversy over the cancelling of a 2003 production directed by Hans Neuenfels at the Deutsche Oper Berlin (see 2006 Idomeneo controversy).

=== Richard Strauss version ===
The approach of the 150th anniversary of Idomeneo's premiere placed some major European opera houses in a quandary: commemorative performances of so magnificent and historically important a score seemed obligatory, but, at the same time, how dared they mount an opera that 1930/31 audiences were bound to reject as hopelessly unstageworthy? The solution hit on in Munich and Vienna was to have Idomeneo adapted for modern tastes, but to show due reverence to Mozart's genius by entrusting the adaptations to famous twentieth-century opera composers with impeccable credentials as Mozarteans. Thus Munich commissioned an Idomeneo revision from Ermanno Wolf-Ferrari, performed in 1931, and the same year the Vienna State Opera presented a distinctively interventionist version of the score by Richard Strauss.

For his adaptation of Idomeneo, Strauss employed a German libretto by Lothar Wallerstein that was partially a translation of the original Italian libretto, but with some changes to reflect the rearranging of the music. Strauss replaced about 1/3 of Mozart's score with some of his own music (even introducing the "Fall of Troy" motif from his own 1928 opera Die ägyptische Helena), and rearranged much of the music left behind. For example, Ilia's opening aria "Padre, germani, addio!" is mostly intact with a few changes to the long introductory recitative, but when Idamante (specifically written to be sung by a tenor in this version) enters, he sings Mozart's Non piu, tutto ascoltai, K490 (which was added to Mozart's original revision of Idomeneo) instead of "Non ho colpa". A few major changes to the plot were made as well, such as changing princess Elettra to priestess Ismene. Critics have noted that Strauss's additions contain an interesting blend of the classical style of composition and Strauss's own characteristic sound. In 1984, New York's Mostly Mozart Festival presented Strauss's version with Jerry Hadley in the title role, Delores Ziegler as Idamante, and Alessandra Marc as Ismene.

=== Other appearances ===
In 2004 the opera RAAFF was premiered by the Dutch composer Robin de Raaff which centers around the problematic relationship and friendship between young Mozart and the much older Anton Raaff. Mozart wrote the title role of Idomeneo for Anton Raaff after he arranged the commission to write the opera for the court of Munich. RAAFF, an opera in two acts and an epilogue, is scored for 6 singers, an actor, mixed choir, and symphony orchestra (including a fretless bass guitar, a Fender Rhodes and a drum kit). The opera was commissioned by the Dutch National Opera and the Holland Festival, directed by Pierre Audi to whom the opera is dedicated. A directorial registration is available on YouTube.

== Roles ==
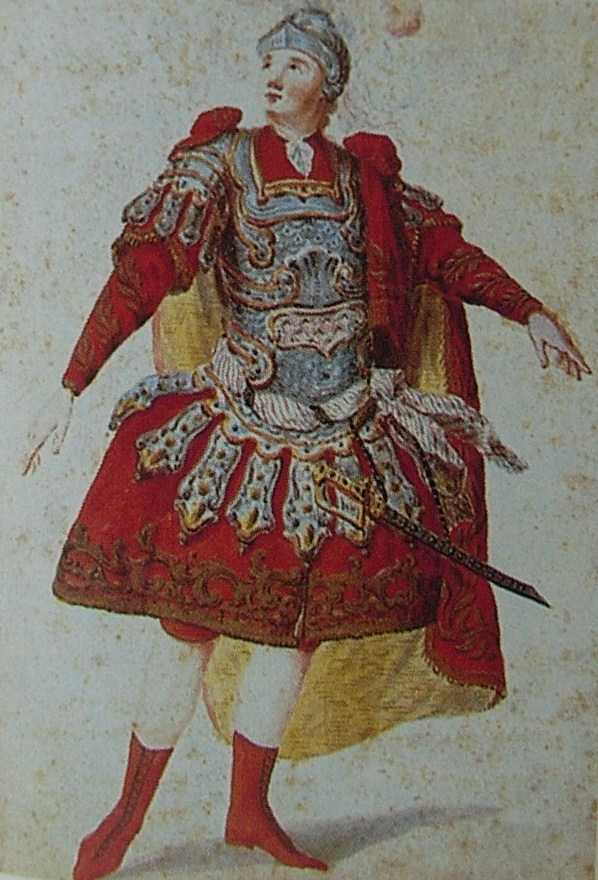
Anton Raaff as Idomeneo in Munich

Roles, voice types, premiere cast
Role	Voice type	Premiere cast, 29 January 1781 Conductor: Christian Cannabich
Ilia, daughter of King Priam of Troy	soprano	Dorothea Wendling
Idomeneo (Idomeneus), King of Crete	tenor	Anton Raaff
Idamante (Idamantes), son of Idomeneo	soprano castrato, later rewritten as tenor	Vincenzo dal Prato
Elettra (Electra), Princess of Argos	soprano	Elisabeth Wendling
Arbace (Arbaces), Idomeneo's confidant	tenor	Domenico de' Panzacchi
High priest of Neptune	tenor	Giovanni Valesi
The voice of the Oracle of Neptune	bass	
Two Cretan women	soprano and mezzo-soprano	
Two Trojans	tenor and bass	

== Instrumentation ==
The instrumentation is:

- Woodwinds: 2 flutes, piccolo (only in the storm of act 2), 2 oboes, 2 clarinets, 2 bassoons. B clarinets (an instrument that is now obsolete) are used in No. 15 (pp. 283ff in NMA) and No. 19 (pp. 352ff).
- Brass: 4 horns (in D, in C, in B♭ (alto)/in B (hoch), in G), 2 trumpets in D, 3 trombones (only accompanying the off-stage voice of Neptune in act 3)
- Percussion: timpani in D and in A
- Basso continuo (harpsichord and violoncello)
- Strings

== Synopsis ==
=== Overture ===
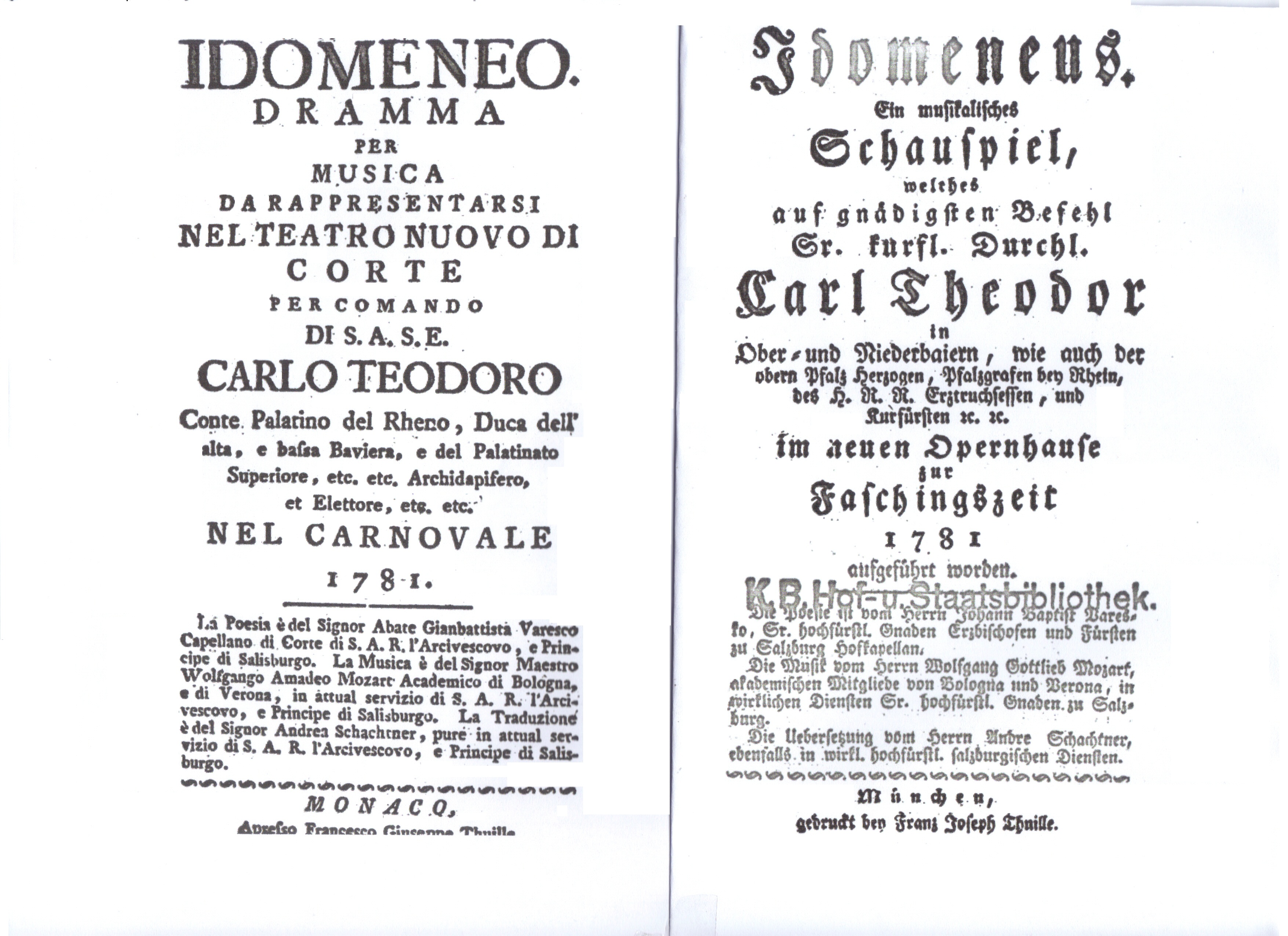
Title pages (Italian and German) from the first version of the original libretto

The overture, in D major and common time, is in a modified sonata form in which the development is but a very short transition section connecting the exposition with the recapitulation. Other conventional hallmarks of the sonata form are apparent: the exposition modulates from the tonic (D major) to the dominant (A major), while the recapitulation is centred on the tonic. The overture concludes with a coda ending in D major chords. These chords, soft and tentative, turn out not to be a resolution of the overture in the tonic but chords in the dominant of G minor, which is the home key of the scene that immediately follows.

=== Act 1 ===
Island of Crete, shortly after the Trojan War. Ilia, daughter of the defeated Trojan King Priam, has been taken to Crete after the war. She loves Prince Idamante, son of the Cretan King Idomeneo, but hesitates to acknowledge her love. Idamante frees the Trojan prisoners in a gesture of good will. He tells Ilia, who is rejecting his love, that it is not his fault that their fathers were enemies. Trojans and Cretans together welcome the return of peace, but Electra, daughter of the Greek King Agamemnon, is jealous of Ilia and does not approve of Idamante's clemency toward the enemy prisoners. Arbace, the king's confidant, brings news that Idomeneo has been lost at sea while returning to Crete from Troy. Electra, fearing that Ilia, a Trojan, will soon become Queen of Crete, feels the furies of the underworld rise up in her heart (aria: "Tutte nel cor vi sento, furie del crudo averno" – "I feel you all in my heart, furies of the cruel underworld").

Idomeneo is saved by Neptune (god of the sea) and is washed up on a Cretan beach. There he recalls the vow he made to Neptune: to sacrifice, if he should arrive safely on land, the first living creature he should meet. Idamante approaches him, but because the two have not seen each other for a long time, recognition is difficult. When Idomeneo finally realizes the youth that he must sacrifice for the sake of his vow is his own child, he orders Idamante never to seek him out again. Grief-stricken by his father's rejection, Idamante runs off. In an intermezzo between acts 1 and 2, Cretan troops disembarking from Idomeneo's ship are met by their wives, and all praise Neptune.

=== Act 2 ===
At the king's palace, Idomeneo seeks counsel from Arbace, who says another victim could be sacrificed if Idamante were sent into exile. Idomeneo orders his son to escort Electra to her home, Argos. Idomeneo's kind words to Ilia move her to declare that since she has lost everything, he will be her father and Crete her country. As she leaves, Idomeneo realizes that sending Idamante into exile has cost Ilia her happiness as well as his own. Electra welcomes the idea of going to Argos with Idamante.

At the port of Sidon (a fictional city of Crete), Idomeneo bids his son farewell and urges him to learn the art of ruling while he is away. Before the ship can sail, however, a storm breaks out, and a sea serpent appears. Recognizing it as a messenger from Neptune, the king offers himself as atonement for having violated his vow to the god.

=== Act 3 ===
In the royal garden, Ilia asks the breezes to carry her love to Idamante, who appears, explaining that he must go to fight the serpent. When he says he would rather die than suffer the torments of his rejected love, Ilia confesses her love. They are surprised by Electra and Idomeneo. When Idamante asks his father why he sends him away, Idomeneo can only reply that the youth must leave. Ilia asks for consolation from Electra, who is preoccupied with revenge. Arbace comes with news that the people, led by the High Priest of Neptune, are clamoring for Idomeneo. The High Priest tells the king of the destruction caused by Neptune's monster, urging Idomeneo to reveal the name of the person whose sacrifice is demanded by the god. When the king confesses that his own son is the victim, the populace is horrified.

Outside the temple, the king and High Priest join Neptune's priests in prayer that the god may be appeased. Arbace brings news that Idamante has killed the monster. As Idomeneo fears new reprisals from Neptune, Idamante enters in sacrificial robes, saying he understands his father's torment and is ready to die. After an agonizing farewell, Idomeneo is about to sacrifice his son when Ilia intervenes, offering her own life instead. The Voice of Neptune is heard. Idomeneo must yield the throne to Ilia and Idamante. Everyone is relieved except Electra, who longs for her own death. Idomeneo presents Idamante and his bride as the new rulers. The people call upon the god of love and marriage to bless the royal pair and bring peace.

== List of arias ==
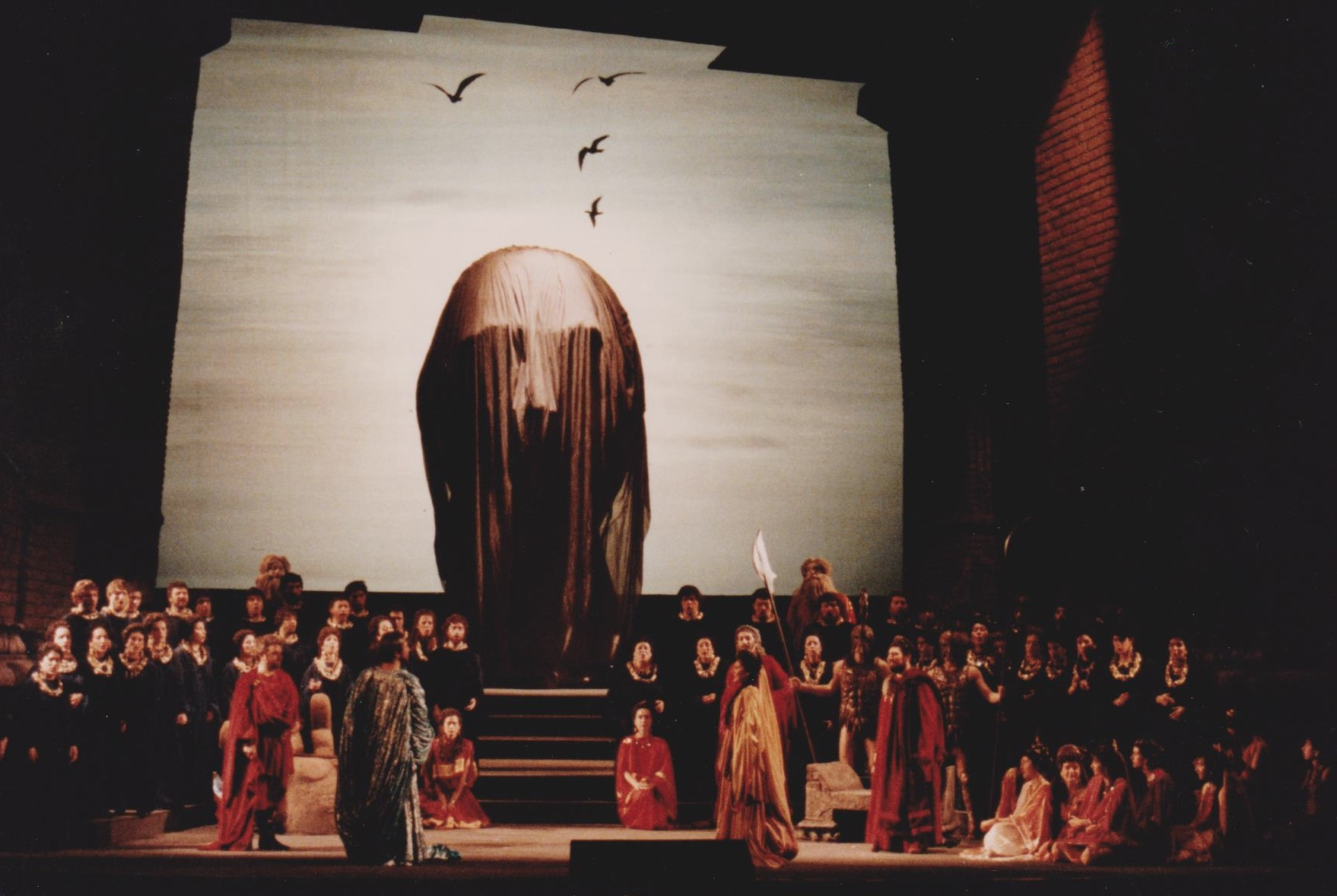
Idomeneo performed at the Teatro Bellini in Catania, directed by Claude d'Anna with set design by Giantito Burchiellaro and costumes by Yvan Stefanutti.

Act 1

- "Padre, germani, addio" ("Father, brothers, farewell"), Ilia
- "Non ho colpa" ("I am not guilty"), Idamante
- "Tutte nel cor vi sento furie del cupo averno" ("I can feel you all in my heart, furies of the dark hell"), Electra
- "Vedrommi intorno" ("I shall see around me"), Idomeneo
- "Il padre adorato" ("My beloved father"), Idamante

Act 2

- "Se il tuo duol" ("If your pain"), Arbace
- "Se il padre perdei" ("If I lost my father"), Ilia
- "Fuor del mar" ("Out of the sea"), Idomeneo
- "Idol mio" ("My sweetheart"), Electra

Act 3

- "Zeffiretti lusinghieri" ("Zephyrs caressing"), Ilia
- "Se colà ne' fati è scritto" ("If it is written in the destiny"), Arbace
- "No, la morte io non pavento" ("No, I am not afraid of dying"), Idamante
- "D'Oreste, d'Ajace ho in seno i tormenti" ("I feel Orestes's and Ajax's torments in my heart"), mad scene, Electra
- "Torna la pace" ("Peace comes again"), Idomeneo

== Recordings ==
=== Audio ===
Year	Cast: Ilia, Elettra, Idamante, Idomeneo, Arbace	Conductor opera house and orchestra	Label
1950	Gertraud Hopf, Gertrude Grob-Prandl, Greta Menzel, Horst Taubmann, Herbert Handt	Meinhard von Zallinger; Vienna Symphony; Vienna State Opera Chorus	CD: Vox; Cat: ??
1951	Sena Jurinac, Birgit Nilsson, Léopold Simoneau, Richard Lewis, Alfred Poell	Fritz Busch; Glyndebourne Festival Chorus and Orchestra	CD: Urania Records (live recording), Cat: ??
1956	Sena Jurinac, Lucilla Udovich, Léopold Simoneau, Richard Lewis, James Milligan	John Pritchard; Glyndebourne Festival Chorus and Orchestra	CD: EMI, Cat: CHS 7 63685-2
1956	Hildegard Hillebrecht, Christel Goltz, Waldemar Kmentt, Rudolf Schock, Eberhard Waechter	Karl Böhm; Vienna Philharmonic; Vienna State Opera Chorus	CD: Walhall Eternity Series, Cat: WLCD 0187
1960	Janine Micheau, Berthe Monmart, Jacqueline Sellier, Rémy Corazza, Camille Maurane	Gustave Cloëz; Orchestre Lyrique de l'O.R.T.F; Chorale Lyrique de l'O.R.T.F	CD reissue: Gala, Cat: GL 100.744
1964	Gundula Janowitz, Enriqueta Tarrés, Luciano Pavarotti, Richard Lewis, Neilson Taylor	John Pritchard; London Philharmonic Orchestra; Glyndebourne Festival Opera	CD: Glyndebourne, Cat: 920715 (Notablu)
1968	Margherita Rinaldi, Pauline Tinsley, Ryland Davies, George Shirley, Robert Tear	Colin Davis; BBC Symphony Orchestra; BBC Symphony Chorus	CD: Philips, Cat: 420 130-2
1971	Heather Harper, Rae Woodland, Jessye Norman, Nicolai Gedda, Andréa Snarski	Colin Davis; Italian Radio Symphony Orchestra Rome, Italian Radio Chorus Rome	CD: Opera d'Oro, Cat: 58471129
1971	Anneliese Rothenberger, Edda Moser, Adolf Dallapozza, Nicolai Gedda, Peter Schreier	Hans Schmidt-Isserstedt; Sächsische Staatskapelle Dresden; Leipzig Radio Choir	CD: EMI, Cat: CMS 7 63990 2
1979	Edith Mathis, Júlia Várady, Peter Schreier, Wiesław Ochman, Hermann Winkler	Karl Böhm; Sächsische Staatskapelle Dresden; Leipzig Radio Choir	CD: Deutsche Grammophon, Cat: 429 864-2
1981	Rachel Yakar, Felicity Palmer, Trudeliese Schmidt, Werner Hollweg, Kurt Equiluz	Nikolaus Harnoncourt; Chorus & Zurich Opera House Mozart Orchestra	CD: Teldec, Cat: ??
1983	Lucia Popp, Edita Gruberová, Agnes Baltsa, Luciano Pavarotti, Leo Nucci	John Pritchard; Vienna Philharmonic; Vienna State Opera Chorus	CD: Decca, Cat: 475 7041
1990	Sylvia McNair, Hillevi Martinpelto, Anne Sofie von Otter, Anthony Rolfe Johnson, Nigel Robson	John Eliot Gardiner; English Baroque Soloists; Monteverdi Choir	CD: Archiv Produktion, Cat: 431 674-2
1991	Barbara Hendricks, Roberta Alexander, Susanne Mentzer, Francisco Araiza, Uwe Heilmann	Colin Davis; Bavarian Radio Symphony Orchestra and Chorus	CD: Philips, Cat: 422 537-2
1994	Heidi Grant Murphy, Carol Vaness, Cecilia Bartoli, Plácido Domingo, Thomas Hampson	James Levine; Metropolitan Opera Orchestra and Chorus	CD: Deutsche Grammophon, Cat: ??
2001	Lisa Milne, Barbara Frittoli, Lorraine Hunt Lieberson, Ian Bostridge, Anthony Rolfe Johnson	Charles Mackerras; Edinburgh Festival Chorus; Scottish Chamber Orchestra	CD: EMI, Cat: ??
2007	Martene Grimson, Penelope Mills, Fiona Campbell, Mark Tucker, Paul McMahon	Antony Walker; Cantillation; Orchestra of the Antipodes	CD: ABC Classics, Cat: ??
2009	Sunhae Im, Alexandrina Pendatchanska, Bernarda Fink, Richard Croft, Kenneth Tarver	René Jacobs; Freiburger Barockorchester; RIAS Kammerchor; Recorded at the Immanuelskirche, Wuppertal	CD: Harmonia Mundi, Cat: ??

=== Video ===
- Benjamin Britten (1969, distribution, 2008). BBC. With Peter Pears, Heather Harper, Rae Woodland, Anne Pashley, English Opera Group et al., OCLC 676295503
- John Pritchard (1974) Glyndebourne Chorus. With Richard Lewis, Bozena Betley, Josephine Barstow, Leo Goeke, Alexander Oliver.
- James Levine (1982). Deutsche Grammophon. With Luciano Pavarotti, Frederica von Stade, Ileana Cotrubaș, Hildegard Behrens and John Alexander. This was the Metropolitan Opera's first production of the work. See details: Idomeneo (Luciano Pavarotti recording).
- Bernard Haitink (1983). NVC Arts. Staged by Trevor Nunn. Starring: Philip Langridge, Jerry Hadley (singing the tenor version of Idamante), Yvonne Kenny, Carol Vaness. Filmed in Glyndebourne, studio condition.
- Ineke Houtman (1993). 50-minute version for children, with actor Frank Groothof playing almost all roles.
- Marco Guidarini (2004). Dynamic. Staged by Pier Luigi Pizzi. Starring: Kurt Streit; Sonia Ganassi; Angeles Blancas Gulin; Iano Tamar; Jörg Schneider; Dario Magnabosco; Deyan Vatchkov; Antonietta Bellon; Lucia Gaeta; Carmine Durante, Carmine Mennella. Orchestra and Chorus of Teatro di San Carlo, Naples.
- Daniel Harding (2005). RAI Trade. Camilla Tilling, Emma Bell, Monica Bacelli, Steve Davislim, Francesco Meli. Staged by Luc Bondy. Live from La Scala.
- Sir Roger Norrington (2006). Decca. Part of the M22 Project from the Salzburg Festival. Staged by Ursel and Karl-Ernt Herrmann at House for Mozart. With Ramón Vargas, Magdalena Kožená, Anja Harteros, Ekaterina Siurina, Jeffrey Francis.
- Kent Nagano (2008). Medici Arts. Staged by Dieter Dorn. With John Mark Ainsley, Pavol Breslik (singing the tenor version of Idamante), Juliane Banse, Annette Dasch, Rainer Trost, Guy de Mey, Steven Humes. Live from the Bavarian State Opera.
- Nikolaus Harnoncourt (2009). styriarte Festival Edition. Conducted by Nikolaus, staged by Philipp Harnoncourt. With Saimir Pirgu; Julia Kleiter; Marie-Claude Chappuis; Eva Mei; Arnold Schoenberg Choir; Concentus Musicus Wien. Includes all original ballet scenes.
- James Levine (2017). Metropolitan Opera with Matthew Polenzani, Alice Coote, Nadine Sierra, and Elza van den Heever. Live from the Metropolitan Opera House.
- Ivor Bolton (2020) with Eric Cutler, David Portillo, Annett Fritsch, Eleonora Buratto, Orchestra and chorus of the Teatro Real. DVD:Opus Arte Cat:OA1317D

== See also ==
- 2006 Idomeneo controversy
