= Raaf =

Raaf or de Raaf is a surname. Notable people with the surname include:

- Anton Raaff (6 May 1714 – 28 May 1797) was a German tenor
- Helmut de Raaf (born November 5, 1961) is a German former professional ice hockey goaltender
- Sabrina Raaf, American mechanized sculpture artist, and photographer

== See also ==
- RAAF (disambiguation)
- Raaff
