= Romolo ed Ersilia (Hasse) =

Opera by Johann Adolph Hasse

- Opera by Johann Adolph Hasse
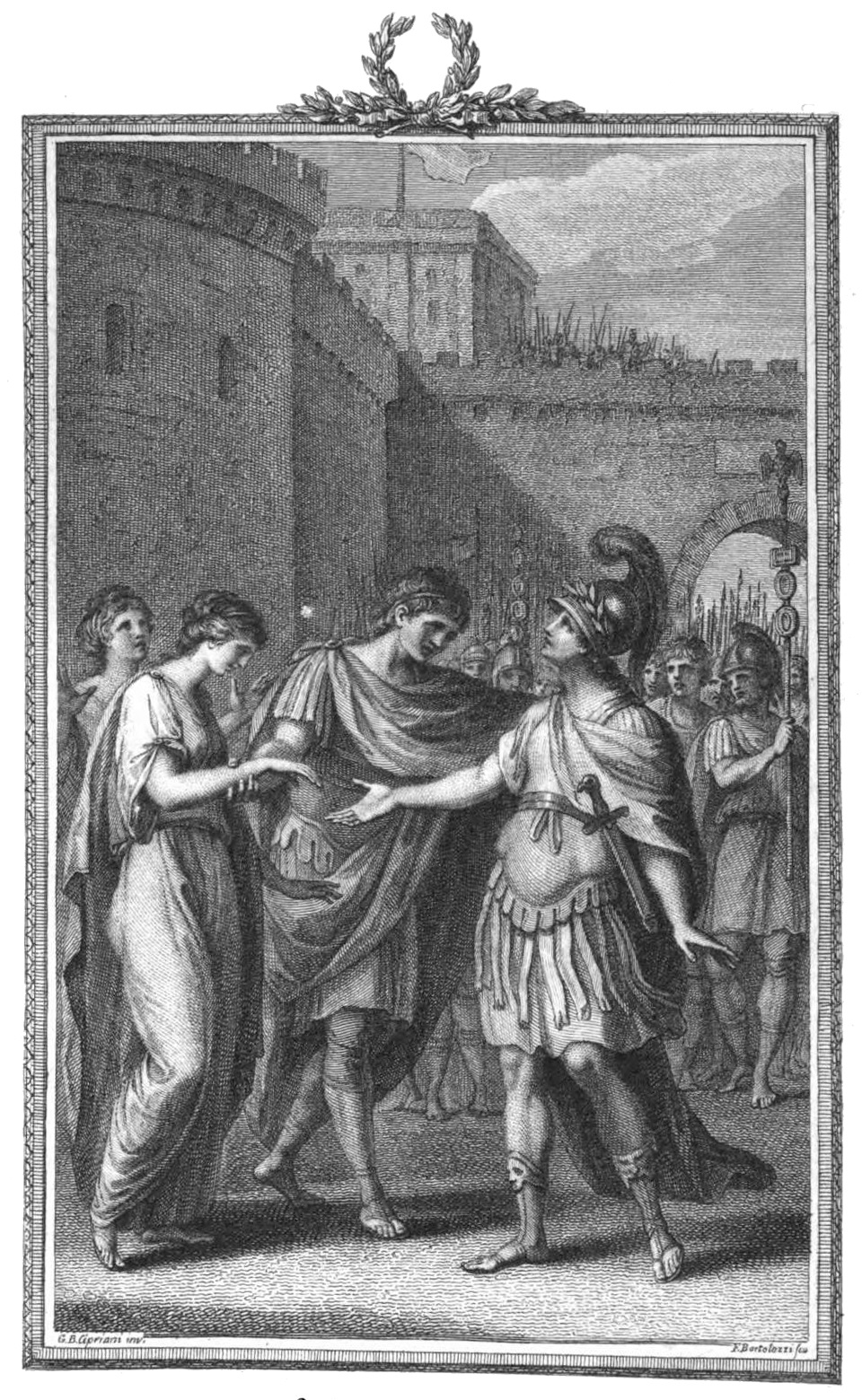
- Illustration of the opera's final scene from a 1781 copy of the libretto
- Librettist: Pietro Metastasio
- Premiere: 6 August 1765; Imperial Palace, Innsbruck

Romolo ed Ersilia is a three-act opera composed by Johann Adolph Hasse to an Italian-language libretto by Pietro Metastasio. The opera was commissioned by Empress Maria Theresa to celebrate the marriage of her son Leopold to Maria Luisa of Spain. The opera was first performed on 6 August 1765, the day after their wedding, in the court theatre of the Imperial Palace in Innsbruck. The opera received its first performance in modern times in 2011 during the Innsbruck Festival of Early Music.

The opera is loosely based on The Rape of the Sabine Women, an episode in the legendary history of Rome, traditionally dated to 750 BC. The opera's main protagonists are Romolo (Romulus, the founder and ruler of Rome) and Ersilia (Hersilia, who became the wife of Romulus).

The same libretto was set eight years later by Josef Mysliveček and again titled Romolo ed Ersilia. The libretto also formed the basis for a 1780 ballet d'action choreographed by Charles Le Picq to music by Martín y Soler and entitled Il ratto delle Sabine. An opera entitled Romolo ed Ersilia is the opera seria which is parodied as the "opera within an opera" in Donizetti's Le convenienze ed inconvenienze teatrali.

== Roles ==
Role	Voice type (Note: In the modern revival the male castrato roles were sung by women, mezzo-sopranos for Romolo and Acronte and a soprano for Ostilio.)	Premiere cast, 6 August 1765
Romolo (Romulus), the king and founder of Rome	castrato	Gaetano Guadagni
Ersilia, Hersilia, a Sabine princess bethrothed to Romolo	soprano	Anna de Amicis
Curzio, Sabine king and Ersilia's father	tenor	Domenico Panzacchi
Acronte, a Sabine prince and rejected suitor of Ersilia	castrato	Gaspare Pacchierotti
Valeria, a Roman noblewoman betrothed to Acronte but abandoned by him	soprano	Teresa Dupré née Sartori
Ostilio, Romolo's friend, in love with Valeria	castrato	Luca Fabbris
The people of Rome
