= Johann Baptist Wendling =

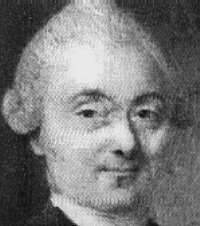

Background information
- Also known as: Jean Baptiste Wendling
- Born: 17 June 1723 (baptised); Ribeauvillé, Alsace
- Died: 27 November 1797 Munich, Bavaria
- Instruments: Concert flute
- Years active: 1745–1797

Johann Baptist Wendling (baptised 17 June 1723 – 27 November 1797) was a flute player and composer of the Mannheim School. He held the position of principal flute in the Mannheim and Munich court orchestras under directors Johann Stamitz and Christian Cannabich, and was acknowledged as one of the finest virtuosos of his time.

== Biography ==
Wendling was born in Ribeauvillé (Rappoltsweiler), Alsace. He was employed at the court of Deux-Ponts (Zweibrücken) from 1745 and joined the Mannheim court orchestra in 1752 as principal flautist. He married the soprano Dorothea Wendling née Spurni in Mannheim on 9 January 1752. Wendling went on many successful concert tours throughout Europe, including several times to Paris where he performed at the Concert Spirituel. In 1778 he relocated to Munich with the court orchestra and continued to perform. He died in Munich.

Wendling was renowned for his virtuosity and for his expressive playing, and his influence as a performer can be found in the compositions of all the important composers of the Mannheim school, including Johann Stamitz, Ignaz Holzbauer, Christian Cannabich, Anton Fils, and Ignaz Fränzl. He had significant personal and musical contact with Johann Christian Bach and Wolfgang Amadeus Mozart and influenced their conception of the capabilities of the flute. In 1778 Mozart wrote the solo flute part of his Sinfonia concertante (K.Anh.9/297b, lost) for Wendling, which is believed by some to be related to the Sinfonia Concertante for Four Winds (K.Anh.C14.01). In 1781 Wendling took part in the premiere of Mozart's opera Idomeneo in Munich, with his wife Dorothea performing the part of Ilia and his brother's wife Elisabeth the part of Elettra. Ilia's second aria contains a four-part obbligato for flute, oboe, bassoon and horn, composed by Mozart for Wendling and his colleagues.

Wendling was also active as a flute teacher, not only of noble amateurs but also of the next generation of professionals. His most notable pupils were Duke Christian IV of Deux-Ponts, Elector Carl Theodor of Mannheim, the Count (from 1776, Duke) of Guines, Johann Baptist Becke, Johann Georg Metzger, Johann Nikolaus Heroux and Jakob Heinrich Appold.

== As described by his contemporaries ==
The Mozart family heard Wendling play in a concert in Schwetzingen on 18 July 1763. Leopold Mozart wrote the next day:

"I had the pleasure to hear, besides good singers of both sexes, the admirable flauto traverso, Wendling."

The German pianist and poet Christian Friedrich Daniel Schubart heard Wendling in Mannheim in 1773 and later wrote:

"Wendling, an excellent flautist who knows how to combine true principles with finished execution. His performance is clear and beautiful, and his tone equally full and incisive in the low and high registers. He is more proud of bringing out the beautiful and the pleasing than the difficult, rapid or rushed."

Another contemporary, the Bavarian lexicographer Felix Joseph Lipowsky, wrote:

"Wendling was one of the foremost flute players of his time, and was universally treasured and renowned as one of the greatest virtuosos of this instrument. He made several tours, and found extraordinary acclaim in all the great cities, and courts of kings and princes. When he played the flute at the Concert Spirituel in 1780, he won great honour, universal glory, and the loudest applause."

== Works ==
Wendling's works were published in France, England, Holland and Germany, and they all feature the flute. His works are now being re-issued by major international music publishers, including Schott, Henle, Heinrichshofen, Eulenburg, and Hug. A quartet in G major published under Wendling's name (as op.10/6, Nagel, 1957) is a misattribution.

- 12 sonatas for flute and basso
- 36 duets for two flutes
- 30 trios for flute, violin and cello
- 3 quartets for flute, violin, viola and cello
- 14 concertos for flute and orchestra

== Sources ==
- Anspacher, Peter. Preface to Johann Baptist Wendling, Concerto in C major. Zürich: Hug, 1989.
- Clive, Peter. Mozart and his Circle. London: J. M. Dent, 1993. ISBN 0-460-86078-X.
- Eisen, Cliff, and Keefe, Simon P., eds. The Cambridge Mozart Encyclopedia. Cambridge: Cambridge University Press, 2006. ISBN 978-0521856591.
- Gärtner, Heinz. John Christian Bach: Mozart's Friend and Mentor. Portland, Oregon: Amadeus Press, 1994. ISBN 0-931340-79-9.
- Holmes, Edward. The Life of Mozart. London: Chapman & Hall, 1845.
- Lipowsky, Felix Joseph. Baierisches Musik-Lexikon. Munich: Giel, 1811.
- Mercure de France (Paris). 1751–1780.
- Schubart, Christian Friedrich Daniel. Ideen zu einer Ästhetik der Tonkunst. Vienna: J. V. Degen, 1806.
- Würtz, Roland. "Wendling, Johann Baptist," in The New Grove Dictionary of Music and Musicians. 1st edition. London: Macmillan, 1980.
- Gunson, Emily Jill. Johann Baptist Wendling (1723–1797): Life, Works, Artistry, and Influence; including a Thematic Catalogue of all his Composition, Ph.D. Dissertation, University of Western Australia, 1999.
- Gunson, Emily Jill. "Wendling, Johann Baptist," in The New Grove Dictionary of Music and Musicians. 2nd edition. London: Macmillan, 2001.
- Pelker, Bärbel. "Wendling, Johann Baptist," in Musik in Geschichte und Gegenwart, 2nd edition. Kassel: Bärenreiter, 2007, Personenteil 17, Sp. 765–769.
