= Le convenienze ed inconvenienze teatrali =

Opera by Gaetano Donizetti

- Opera by Gaetano Donizetti
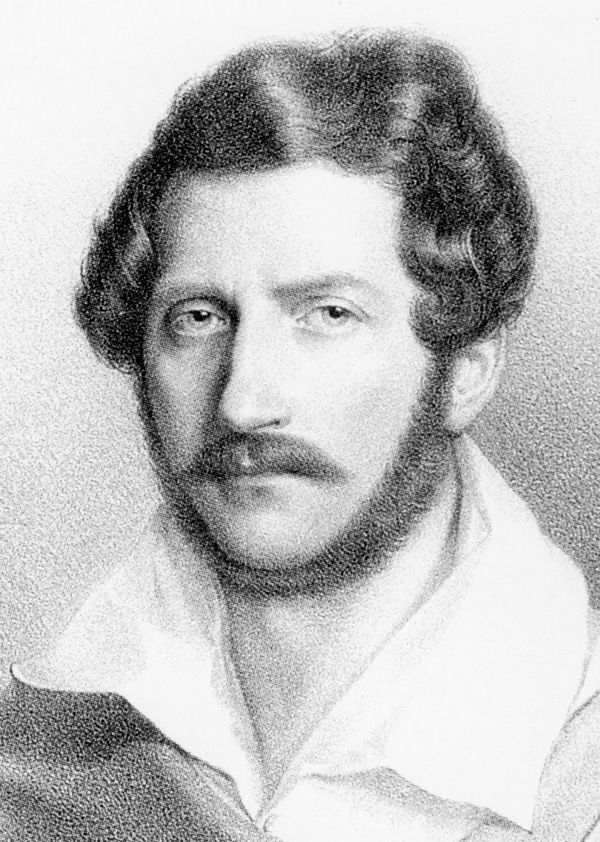
- The composer c. 1835
- Other title: Viva la mamma, Viva la Diva
- Librettist: Domenico Gilardoni
- Language: Italian
- Based on: plays by Antonio Simone Sografi
- Premiere: 20 April 1831 (2-act version); Teatro alla Cannobiana in Milan

Le convenienze ed inconvenienze teatrali (Conventions and Inconveniences of the Stage), also known as Viva la mamma and Viva la Diva, is a dramma giocoso, or opera, in two acts by Gaetano Donizetti. The Italian libretto was written by Domenico Gilardoni, adapted from Antonio Simeone Sografi's plays Le convenienze teatrali (1794) and Le inconvenienze teatrali (1800).

The title refers to the convenienze, which were the rules relating to the ranking of singers (primo, secondo, comprimario) in 19th-century Italian opera, and the number of scenes, arias etc. that they were entitled to expect.

== Performance history ==
19th century

The opera was originally a one-act farsa based on Le convenienze teatrali; this version premiered at the Teatro Nuovo in Naples on 21 November 1827. Donizetti revised it and added recitatives and material from Le inconvenienze teatrali; this final version premiered at the Teatro alla Cannobiana in Milan on 20 April 1831.

20th century and beyond

Convenienze had its first major modern revival in 1963 in Siena, and has subsequently appeared in a number of translations and under various titles, most notably as Viva la mamma, a German adaptation presented in Munich in 1969.

In the UK, the first staged performance was not given until 9 April 1976 by an amateur company, the Harrow Opera Workshop, but that performance had been preceded by a 1969 BBC broadcast under the name of Upstage and Downstage; in 1972 Opera Rara, the recording company, produced the one-act version in English as The Prima Donna's Mother is a Drag. In the US, the first production was given in Terre Haute, Indiana on 2 April 1966.

A 2004 production at the Opera of Monte Carlo starred June Anderson. In October 2009, the opera was performed at La Scala as Le Convenienze ed inconvenienze teatrali, under the direction of Marco Guidarini; there is a live DVD recording of this performance.

The opera was staged (as Viva la Mamma) in 2017 in the Estates Theatre of the Czech National Theatre in Prague. A contemporary version in English by Kit Hesketh-Harvey entitled Viva La Diva was staged, in association with the Salzburg State Theatre, at the Buxton Opera House as part of the 2022 Buxton International Festival, with the Northern Chamber Orchestra, directed by Stephen Medcalf, and with George Humphreys in the role of Agata (who becomes "Lady Wigan" in the contemporary English production).

Possibly the first Canadian production, of the two-act version, was mounted by the University of Toronto Faculty of Music in November 2025, directed by Maria Lamont and conducted by Russell Braun.

== Roles ==
Role	Voice type	Premiere Cast, Final revision 20 April 1827 (Conductor: - )
Daria Garbinati, prima donna (literally, please yourself)	soprano	Fanny Corri-Paltoni
Procolo, her husband	bass	Cesare Badiali
Biscroma Strappaviscere, conductor, (literally, bowel ripper)	baritone	
Donna Agata Scannagalli, Luigia's mother, a Neapolitan (literally, rooster slaughterer)	baritone	Gennaro Luzio
Luigia Castragatti, seconda donna, (literally, cat castrator)	soprano	
Guglielmo Antolstoinoff, primo tenore, German	tenor	Giuseppe Giordano
Cesare Salsapariglia, druggist and poet (literally, sarsaparilla)	baritone	Vincenzo Galli
Impresario	bass	
Director of the Theatre	bass	
Soldiers, servants, workmen

== Synopsis ==
Time: 18th century
Place: "A provincial Italian theatre"

A regional (and mediocre) operatic troupe is rehearsing a new work—Romulus and Ersilia (Note: The "opera within an opera" is treated as a parody of the opera seria genre. There are at least two actual settings of Metastasio's libretto Romolo ed Ersilia: that by Hasse in 1765, and that by Mysliveček in 1773.)—and faces numerous obstacles. The prima donna acts every bit the diva, refusing to rehearse. The German tenor cannot master either the lyrics or melodies. In the midst of much quarrelling, various singers threaten to walk out. The situation turns more dire with the arrival of Mamma Agata (a baritone role), the mother of the seconda donna. She insists on a solo for her daughter and even issues detailed demands on the musical arrangement of the aria. When the German tenor refuses to go on, he is replaced by the prima donna's husband. The show eventually collapses, and rather than pay back all the investors (whose money has already been spent), the company flees the town under cover of night.

== Recordings ==
Year	Cast (L'Impresario, Prima Donna, Luigia, First Musician, Madama Agata)	Conductor, Opera House and Orchestra	Label
1976	Leo Nucci, Daniela Mazzucato (Meneghini), Alberta Valentini, Laura Zannini, Giuseppe Taddei	Carlo Franci; Vienna State Opera Orchestra and Chorus (Recording of a performance in the Theater am Kornmarkt, Bregenz as part of the Bregenz Festival)	Audio CD: Bella Voce; Cat: BLV 107232
