= Jörg Schneider =

Jörg Schneider may refer to:

- Jörg Schneider (actor) (1935–2015), Swiss actor
- Jörg Schneider (politician) (born 1964), German politician
- Jörg Schneider (tenor) (born 1969), Austrian opera singer
