= Vincenzo dal Prato =

Italian opera singer

Vincenzo dal Prato (5 May 1756 – 1828) was an Italian soprano castrato singer, famous for his work with Mozart.

== Early life ==
Dal Prato was born in Imola, Italy. Here he studied under Lorenzo Gibelli and made his debut at sixteen years of age in 1777 at Fano. In 1779 he was invited to sing for the Russian Crown Prince (who became Tsar Paul I) in Stuttgart. During his time in Germany he was discovered by one of Paul's "talent scouts" and immediately engaged to work in Munich. Dal Prato was a full-time professional singer during the years 1780 to 1805. He was very popular, handsome, and considered to be good-natured with everyone; his singing style was renowned for its high quality but his acting was thought to be of an average standard. His favourite role was that of the serious lover in comic operas, which he supposedly enjoyed immensely because it allowed him to flaunt his lyrical talents without requiring any great acting skills.

== Career ==
In 1781, 24 years old, he was called upon to perform the role of Idamante in Mozart's Idomeneo re di Creta at Munich, although after his first collaboration Mozart was not impressed by dal Prato.

From the letters which Mozart wrote to his father up to 1780, it appears that all his dealings with castrati had been difficult. Mozart stated Manzuoli was brilliant but stubborn, Rauzzini was immature and unpredictable, Tenducci was a renowned libertine, but he had a naturally charming voice and seemed a natural for the role. Mozart had been commissioned to write Idomeneo for the carnival of 1781 and the role of Idamante was to be given to a castrato. Mozart had a very poor opinion of dal Prato, and he was to be primo uomo in name only. He did not consider him worthy of such an important role.

After Idomeneo, dal Prato remained in Munich for 25 years and established himself as a famous primo uomo, despite Mozart's criticism. Mozart repeatedly referred to dal Prato very sarcastically in his letters to his father as il nostro molto amato castrato Dal Prato (our much-loved castrato dal Prato) and in late 1780 describes him as "shoddy". In another letter he insists that dal Prato ha cantato in modo vergognoso (sang in a shameful way), and even considered calling the castrato Ceccarelli, whom Mozart despised, from Salzburg to take over as Idamante. Mozart did not think dal Prato would be able to finish rehearsals, let alone perform. He describes dal Prato as "rotten through and through", and says that he has "no notion how to sing a cadenza effectively", adding that "I have to teach him everything, as though he had started yesterday." The singing of the recitatives was ruined by the tenor Anton Raaff (in the title role) and by dal Prato, and he said they were the worst actors he had ever come across.

Mozart wrote the quartet Andrò ramingo e solo to start with Idamante, but the style was completely new and nothing like it had ever been seen in opera seria. None of the singers were up to the task and they all reacted against it. Mozart wrote to his father in the depths of despair, blaming the worst reaction on dal Prato. He said dal Prato's voice would not be so bad if it came out from somewhere other than his mouth. He was completely unable to intone the quartet, Mozart said, had no method, and "sang like a young boy auditioning for a part in the chapel choir". Mozart must have been fond of this quartet because he arranged for a private recital two and a half years later, with himself singing the role of Idamante (in a transcription for tenor). He burst into tears and had to run out of the room, and not even his wife Constanze could talk him into coming back.

Dal Prato sang the part and was awarded a pension by the Elector Karl Theodor, which he received until his death at Munich in 1828.
