= Temistocle (J.C. Bach) =

1772 opera seria by Johann Christian Bach

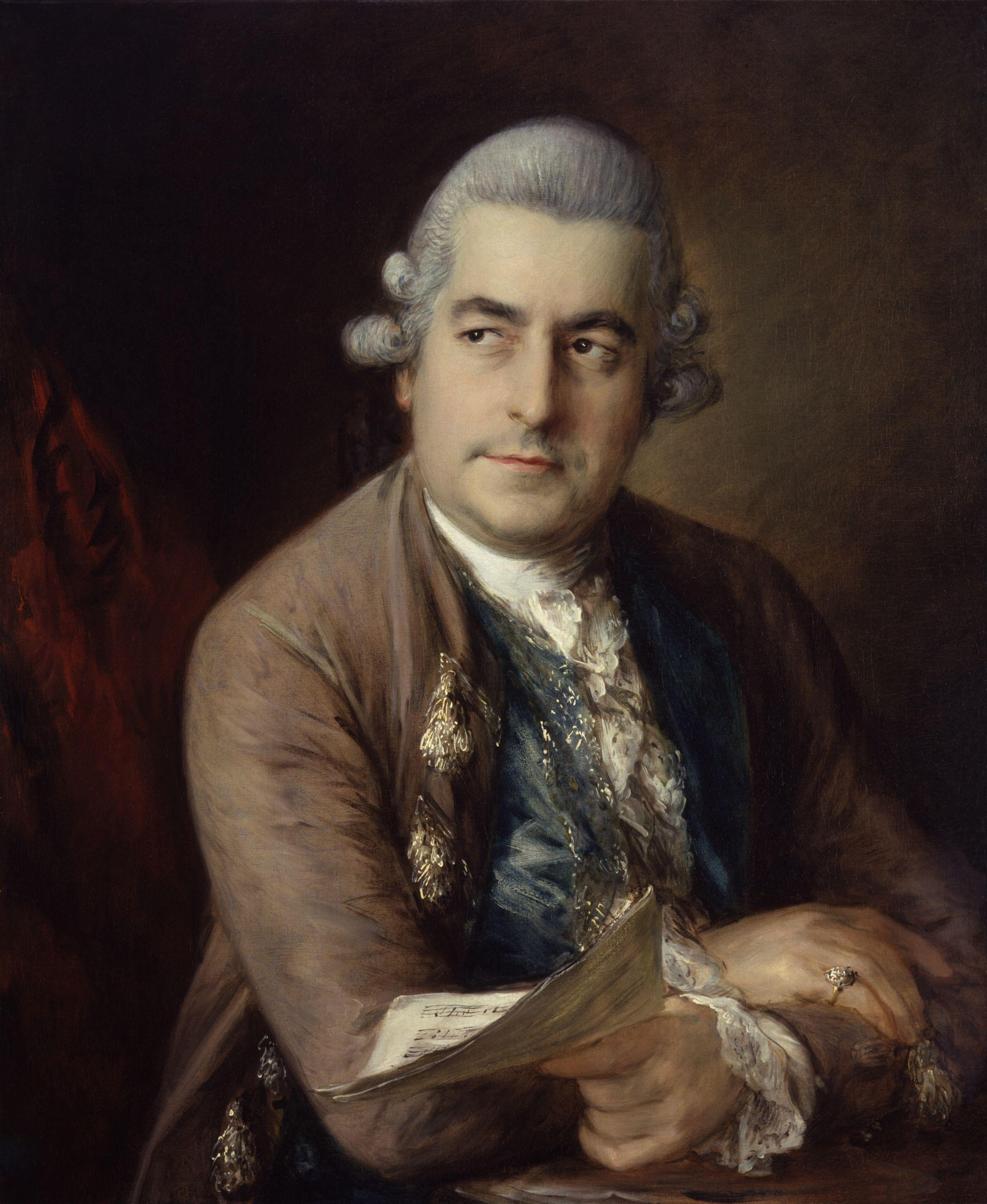
Portrait of Johann Christian Bach by Thomas Gainsborough, 1776

Temistocle (Themistocles) is an opera seria in three acts by the German composer Johann Christian Bach. The Italian text is an extensive revision of the libretto by Metastasio first set by Antonio Caldara in 1736, by Mattia Verazi, court poet and private secretary to the Elector Palatine Carl Theodor. The opera was the first of two which J. C. Bach set for the Elector Palatine. Some of the music was reused from earlier works, including part of the overture from Carattaco (composed in London in 1767).

== Performance history ==
Temistocle was first performed at the Court Theatre in Mannheim on 4 November 1772, with a notable cast including Anton Raaff and Dorothea and Elisabeth Wendling, all singers that later worked with Mozart.

== Roles ==
Roles, voice types, premiere cast
Role	Voice type	Premiere cast, 4 November 1772
Temistocle (Themistocles), Athenian general and politician	tenor	Anton Raaff
Aspasia, daughter of Temistocle, in love with Lisimaco	soprano	Dorothea Wendling
Rossana (Roxana), a princess, in love with Serse	soprano	Elisabeth Wendling
Lisimaco (Lysimachus), Athenian ambassador and friend of Temistocle	soprano castrato	Silvio Giorgetti
Serse, King of Persia (Xerxes I)	bass	Giovanni Battista Zonca
Neocle (Neocles), son of Temistocle	soprano castrato	Francesco Roncaglia
Sebaste (Sebastes), confidant of Serse, later a conspirator against him	alto castrato	Vincenzo Mucciolo

== Synopsis ==
The opera takes place in Persia. Temistocle, together with his son Neocle, has been expelled from Athens. He arrives incognito at Susa, the capital of his arch-enemy King Serse, to find that his daughter Aspasia (in love with the Athenian ambassador Lisimaco) has also made her way there, following a shipwreck. Eventually all is revealed and Serse magnanimously pardons everybody, unites the lovers and makes peace with Athens.

== Recordings ==
A complete recording is available on Oriel Music Trust, OMT945. Conducted by Charles Mackerras, the cast includes William McAlpine, Marie Hayward, Anne Evans, Patricia Kern, April Cantelo, Raimund Herincx, Maureen Lehane, BBC Northern Symphony Orchestra and Singers. The overture is available on CD, for example on Johann Christian Bach: Complete Opera Overtures, performed by the Hanover Band conducted by Anthony Halstead (CPO Records 9999632, 2003). WorldCat lists a recording of Temistocle with Vladimir Delman, Herbert Handt, Kate Gamberucci, Renato Cesari, Radiotelevisione Italiana, Orchestra Alessandro Scarlatti di Napoli, OCLC 604044585.

== See also ==
- Temistocle (Porpora) (1718)
