= Capriccio (record label) =

Austrian classical music record label

- Parent company: Naxos
- Genre: classical music
- Country of origin: Austria
- Location: Vienna
- Official website: www.capriccio.at

Capriccio is a formerly German, now Austrian, classical music record label. Before the reunification of Germany in 1989, it was known for releasing recordings by musicians based in East Germany.

The original Capriccio label was founded in the 1980s and was until 2010 part of Delta-Music GmbH, a German record company located in Großkönigsdorf, Frechen near Cologne, which was founded in 1970 by Philippe Sautot and Jürgen Moll.

Following the bankruptcy of the Delta Music GMBH, the artistic director of Capriccio, Johannes Kernmayer, decided to carry on with several ongoing, but unfunded, recording projects from the profitable classical section of Delta as "Phoenix Edition." The releases on Phoenix Edition were commercially successful and enabled Kernmayer to rescue the classical back-catalogue of Capriccio and reestablish the Capriccio label as a new independent company in Vienna. Capriccio was acquired by Naxos.

== Artists ==
- Renate Behle (soprano) and son Daniel Behle (tenor)
- Werner Erhardt (conductor, violin)
- Friedrich Gulda and Joe Zawinul (two pianos)
- Jörg Schneider
- Roman Trekel and Hartmut Höll
