= Robin de Raaff =

Dutch composer

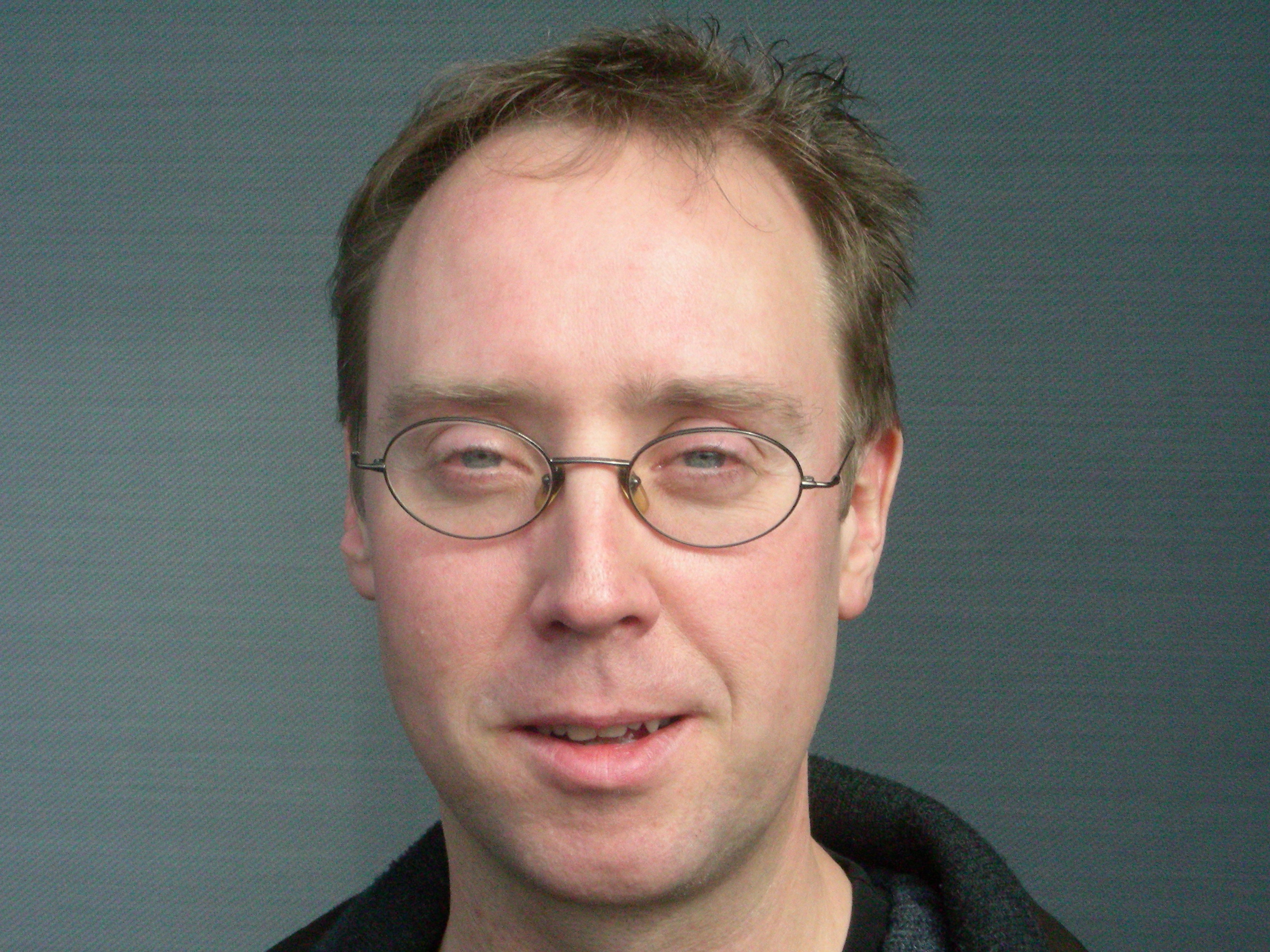
- Robin de Raaff, Rotterdam Codarts 2006
- Born: Hubertus Jacobus de Raaff; 5 December 1968 (age 57); Breda, Noord-Brabant
- Other name: Robin
- Citizenship: Dutch
- Education: Aspen Music Festival and School - fellow in composition (2001) / Tanglewood Music Center-senior fellowship in composition through a Reader's Digest scolarship(2000) / Royal College of Music (1999 to 2002) / Hochschule for Music und Theater Felix Mendelssohn Bartholdy in Leipzig (1996) / Sweelinck Conservatory of Amsterdam (now Conservatory of Amsterdam) (1992 to 1997)
- Occupations: Composer; bassist; academic teacher
- Years active: 1992-present
- Notable work: - Violin Concerto No. 1 "Angelic echoes"; - Waiting for Miss Monroe an opera in three acts; - Atlantis an Oratorio for soprano, baritone, 2 harps solo, orchestra and large mixed choir
- Children: Cecilia Josephine Sapphire de Raaff
- Website: www.robinderaaff.com

Robin de Raaff (pronounced [ˈrobin də ˈra:f]; born in 1968 in Breda, the Netherlands) is a Dutch composer and bassist. De Raaff has written six Symphonies, eleven Concertos for solo instrument(s) and orchestra, an Oratorio entitled Atlantis, two main stage Operas for the Dutch National Opera, a chamber Opera, a mini Ballet, and music for screen as well. De Raaff most recently composed a Cantata for mixed Choir and Orchestra on a poem entitled L'Azur by Stéphane Mallarmé commissioned by the Lucerne Festival through the Foundation Pierre Boulez, and co-commissioned by the NTR-Zaterdagmatinee in the Royal Concertgebouw of Amsterdam. Currently De Raaff is composing a new Symphony, his Symphony No. 7 "Résonances" for orchestra.

His most recent opera Waiting for Miss Monroe is about the death of Marilyn Monroe whose role was sung by American soprano Laura Aikin. His first opera entitled RAAFF is about the complex relationship between the older Anton Raaff and the young "M." (Wolfgang Amadeus Mozart) in their struggle to create the world premiere of Idomeneo. Both operas were commissioned by the Dutch National Opera co-produced by the Holland Festival.

Alongside the creation of these large scale works De Raaff composed a chamber opera, chamber music, vocal music, a series of solo works entitled Contradictie (I to VII) for several musical instruments, a set of Encore's (I-III) for different instruments, songs in different styles, music for a dramatized documentary, and a short ballet for a choreographed/filmed dance project. This dance project was entitled Counter Phrases by Anne Teresa de Keersmaeker and Thierry De Mey for which the music was created by 10 prominent contemporary composers, composing their works after the choreography was filmed. Amongst others Jonathan Harvey, Steve Reich, Magnus Lindberg, Toshio Hosokawa, Luca Francesconi, Thierry de Mey, Fausto Romitelli, and George Aperghis.

De Raaff belongs to the generation of Dutch composers that emerged in the 1990s with an exposure that soon gained International interest leading to regular national and international performances and commissions. In 2001 De Raaff became teacher of Musical composition and Instrumentation. Since the start of academic year 2024–2025 De Raaff also teaches Screen Scoring Instrumentation as part of the new Master Screen Scoring of Codarts, University for the Arts.

== Early life ==
Robin de Raaff grew up in Breda in a musically active family. His father is a pianist and an accordionist with whom young Robin had private piano lessons from the age of seven while individually learning how to play the bass guitar as an autodidact. Through the growing influence of Classical music and progressive Rock Music, De Raaff started composing complete instrumental passages and ultimately completely scored instrumental works alongside a switch to Jazz oriented playing as he discovered the bassist Jaco Pastorius, making him switch to fretless bass guitar as well . De Raaff was accepted as a composition student at the Sweelinck Conservatory (now Conservatorium van Amsterdam) in 1992. In that period, he temporarily stopped playing bass guitar, and the composer in him was predominantly interested in classical music of the 19th and the 20th century and contemporary classical music.

== Career ==
=== Early career (1992–2012) ===
De Raaff moved to Amsterdam in 1992 to pursue his Academic career at the Sweelinck Conservatory. The first years Geert van Keulen was his composition teacher, composer and bass clarinet player in the Royal Concertgebouw Orchestra, in 1997 De Raaff finished the Studies of Composition Cum Laude with Theo Loevendie, composer and Jazz saxophonist.

De Raaff's composition, Symphony No. 2 "Two Worlds Colliding", was originally premiered as his Concerto for Saxophone Quartet and Orchestra but renamed and revised after the world premiere in 2011. It was composed for the Raschèr Saxophone Quartet and commissioned by the NTR Zaterdag Matinee to be premiered at the Royal Concertgebouw in Amsterdam.

During a masterclass, led by composer Pierre Boulez, De Raaff stood out with his opus 1 String Quartet No. 1 "Athomus" meeting up with praise from the French master. The Dutch National Opera organized this masterclass in 1995 when Pierre Boulez was conducting the opera Moses und Aron by Arnold Schoenberg, it was the beginning of a lifelong connection with DNO as Pierre Audi took De Raaff under his wing preparing him to compose his first opera RAAFF which was premiered in 2004 in the Westergasfabriek directed by Pierre Audi. Australian-American soprano Danielle de Niese sang the double role of Dorothea Wendling/Idamante in this production. De Raaff's second opera, Waiting for Miss Monroe was premiered in 2012 in the Stadsschouwburg in Amsterdam directed by Lotte de Beer, both operas were coproductions between DNO and the Holland Festival.

In 1999, after finishing his studies at the Conservatory of Amsterdam, De Raaff become a private student of George Benjamin at the Royal College of Music in London. Alongside his lessons with Benjamin, De Raaff had private lessons with Julian Anderson as well.

=== Tanglewood Music Festival ===
As George Benjamin became Composer-in-Residence in 2000 at the renowned Tanglewood Music Festival he invited De Raaff to become the senior fellow at the summer festival where he won the prestigious Paul Jacobs Memorial Commission for the next summer's Festival of Contemporary Music. This became his first Piano Concerto premiered by Ralph van Raat in 2001 friend and artist-in-residence that year at the FCM. Six years later The Boston Symphony Orchestra commissioned De Raaff to compose an orchestral work that would be premiered in the famous Koussevitzky Shed at Tanglewood in 2007. This became his Entangled Tales for orchestra. For the 75th Anniversary of Tanglewood De Raaff was commissioned to write a composition for brass orchestra, which became his Fanfare.

Aside from his residencies at the Tanglewood Music Festival Robin de Raaff has also been a fellow at the Aspen Festival of Music in 2001 under the mentors Christopher Rouse and Steven Stucky, and he was an artist in residence at the Banff Centre for the Arts, composing his Percussion Concerto in the Valentine Studio in 2013 on Campus.

=== Teaching career ===
Since 2001 Robin de Raaff has been teaching Composition and Instrumentation at Codarts, University for the Arts in Rotterdam, educating a wide array of composers over these years. Since 2021 he also teaches Screen Scoring Instrumentation as part of the new Master Screen Scoring, at the University for the Arts in Rotterdam as well. All through the active years of composing Robin de Raaff has given lectures, talks, pre-concert talks, about his work, and master classes.

=== Further career (2012–present) ===
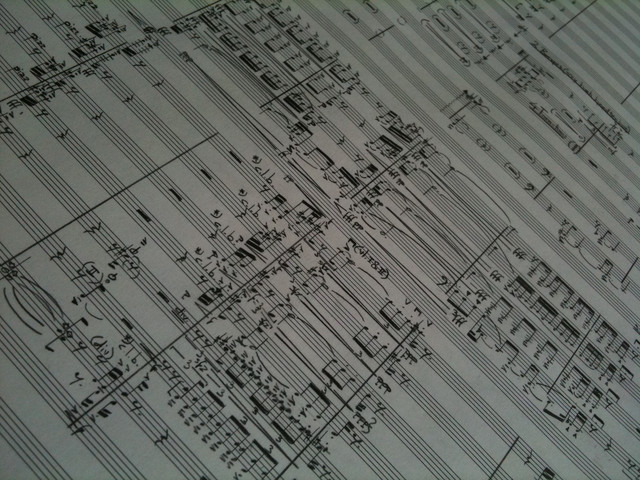
A score excerpt of the handwritten manuscript of the final mouvement of De Raaff's Symphony No. 2 "Two Worlds Colliding" for Saxophone Quartet and Orchestra.

After composing his second opera De Raaff redirected his expanding oeuvre towards non-theatrical works, with a renewed insight developed composing these large scale operas. This new insight can best be described as a new dramaturgical depth in his composing and orchestration, which gave rise to an increasing amount of large scale works. Among them six Symphonies, four of the in total eleven Concertos, an orchestral work, a composition for chamber orchestra, his oratorio Atlantis, two of the in total three String Quartets, a vast number of vocal and instrumental chamber works, and a Suite for saxophone and ensemble from the film music created for the dramatized documentary Megumi. Currently De Raaff is composing a cantate for choir and orchestra on the poem L'Azur by Stéphane Mallarmé.

In 2012 De Raaff changed publisher from Donemus, who represented his work exclusively since 1993, to Deuss Music where his entire oeuvre is presently managed. The copyrights to his oeuvre have been transferred to Buma/Stemra for International exploitation of the performing, broadcasting, and recording rights

Since 2013 De Raaff composes in his own Studio in Betondorp of Amsterdam. The studio is located in an old school in the famous Amsterdam School architectural style.

== Awards ==
- 1995: AG Kunst Prijs, an art reward for his Equilibre II for clarinet and bass clarinet, Athomus for string quartet, & In Memoriam Dmitri Shostakovich for 2 trumpets, 2 horns, and orchestra.
- 1995: KNTV Composition Prize for De vlucht van de magiër for soprano, flute, mandolin, guitar and harp on a poem by Serge van Duijnhoven
- 1997 First prize at the 1997 International Competition for Composers of Chamber Music in Collegium Winterthur (Switzerland) for his work Anachronie for flute and harpsichord
- 1998: Bernhard van den Sigtenhorst Meyer Prize from GeNeCo for his Double concerto for clarinet, bass clarinet and orchestra.
- 1998 Nomination/Jury selection for the Gaudeamus Prize for his Double Concerto for clarinet, bass clarinet & orchestra.
- 2008: Toonzetters Prize for his Violin Concerto No. 1 "Angelic echoes"

== Works ==
For an overview of a selection of De Raaff's Works. For an overview of the complete works by Robin de Raaff visit the Dutch Wikipedia section on the composer where you will find an updated list of his oeuvre: Oeuvre of Robin de Raaff

== Discography ==
=== Albums ===
(Albums/CD's that are completely devoted to De Raaff's work(s)) available on Streaming services like Spotify and Apple Music

- Jaap van Zweden conducts De Raaff– Violin Concerto No. 1 "Angelic Echoes" and Symphony No.1 "Tanglewood Tales". Tasmin Little violin solo and Radio Philharmonic Orchestra EtCetera KTC 1593
- Waiting for Miss Monroe – 2CD; Recording of the World Premiere in 2012, at the anniversary of Marilyn Monroe's death. Challenge Records CC 72685
- Orphic Descent – Piano Concerto No. 2 "Circulus" (Ralph van Raat piano, Matthias Pintscher conducting), Orphic descent (Lawrence Renes conducting), and Violin Concerto No. 2 "North Atlantic Light" (Tosca Opdam violin, Marc Albrecht conducting). The Netherlands Radio Philharmonic Orchestra (track 1 & 2) and The Netherlands Philharmonic Orchestra (track 3) CC 72942 Challenge Records
- Atlantis– Oratorio on Atlantis by Hart Crane, Plato, and texts by the composer. Marisol Montalvo soprano, Mark Stone baritone, Markus Stenz conducting the The Netherlands Radio Philharmonic Orchestra and the Groot Omroep Koor Challenge Records CC 72808
- Entangled Tales– Cello Concerto, Entangled Tales, and Symphony No. 3 "Illumination...Eclipse". Challenge Records CC 72747
- Melodies Unheard– Symphony No. 2 "Two Worlds Colliding" for Saxophone Quartet and Orchestra, Symphony No. 1 "Tanglewood Tales", and Symphony No. 4 "Melodies Unheard". A Symphony of Songs on Poems by Emily Dickinson. Challenge Records CC 72762
- Aeons - Carmina Chromatico, An introduction..., Piano Trio, De Vlucht Van De Magiër, Aeons. CC 720093 Challenge Records (release January 15th 2027)
- Stolen Back from Time – 2CD; Violin Concerto No. 1 "Angelic Echoes", Percussion Concerto, Double Concerto for clarinet, bass clarinet and orchestra, Unisono (Remastered) for Orchestra, Ennea's domein for septet, Clarinet Concerto, and in Memoriam Dmitri Shostakovich for 2 Trumpets, two Horns and Orchestra. Attacca Records ATT 2017152
- Doelen Ensemble performs De Raaff – Der Einsame im Herbst (remastered version), Flute Concerto, Megumi-Suite
- RAAFF– Recording of the World Premiere in 2004
- Orchestral Works – Piano Concerto No. 1, Unisono, Concerto for Orchestra

=== Appearances ===
(Albums featuring single works by De Raaff in compilation with other composers) available on Streaming services like Spotify and Apple Music

CD/Albums:

- Contradictie IVa (1998/rev. 2014 Deuss Music) CD Ladder of Escape 11, Fie Schouten bass clarinet solo, ATT2014140
- Sonate for Violin and Piano No. 2 "North Atlantic Light" - Soundscapes – Carnegie Hall version Challenge Classics. Tosca Opdam Violin & Alexander Ullman piano
- Untangled Tales (2011) for Orchestra, appears on RECHERCHEN by the Junge Deutsche Philharmonie conducted by Lothar Zagrosek
- Clarinet Concerto - Le Nouvel Ensemble Moderne conducted by Lorraine Vaillancourt, clarinet solo Simon Aldrich, FORUM 2006 À Amsterdam
- Piano Trio - Osiris Trio, New Piano Trios from the Netherlands on NM Classics 92132 in 2004
- Gemini Gestures (1998, rev 2003), for 2 string quartets, BV Haast, Schoenberg Quartet and the Mondriaan Quartet
- Un visage d'emprunt (1997, rev 2001) for clarinet, violin, cello, and piano, Concertzender LIVE 02, catalogue number CJX6217 /QDISC 99002
- Der Einsame im Herbst (1998) for large ensemble (named after the 2nd movement Der Einsame im Herbst of Das Lied von der Erde by Gustav Mahler, ) appears on NM Classics MCCL92121
- De vlucht van de Magiër (La fuite du Magicien) - Het Amsterdams Kwintet/De Suite Muziekweek 1996, Taal als Instrument - Armada (8) SUITE 96.01

DVD's:

- Orphic descent - Rosas Ensemble/Ictus Ensemble/Anne Teresa de Keersmaeker/Georges-Elie Octors: The Films of Thierry de Mey 3 DVD Cinéart 50/CIN1015

== Other Publications ==
=== Writings ===
- Ons Erfdeel (Our heritage) - Edition 46 (2003): Robin de Raaff Expressionistic structuralist
- Dutch Heights - A portrait of the composer on the occasion of winning a Composition Prize for his Violin Concerto No. 1 "Angelic echoes", a highlight of Art prizes in The Netherlands in 2009.
- Stealing back from Time - a biography of Robin de Raaff written for the occasion of his composer-in-residency at the November Music Festival 2012

=== Podcasts ===
- On the occasion of a performance of De Raaff's Orphic descent (2003) for chamber orchestra in the Concertgebouw of Amsterdam in 2023.
