= Temistocle (Porpora) =

1718 opera by Nicola Porpora

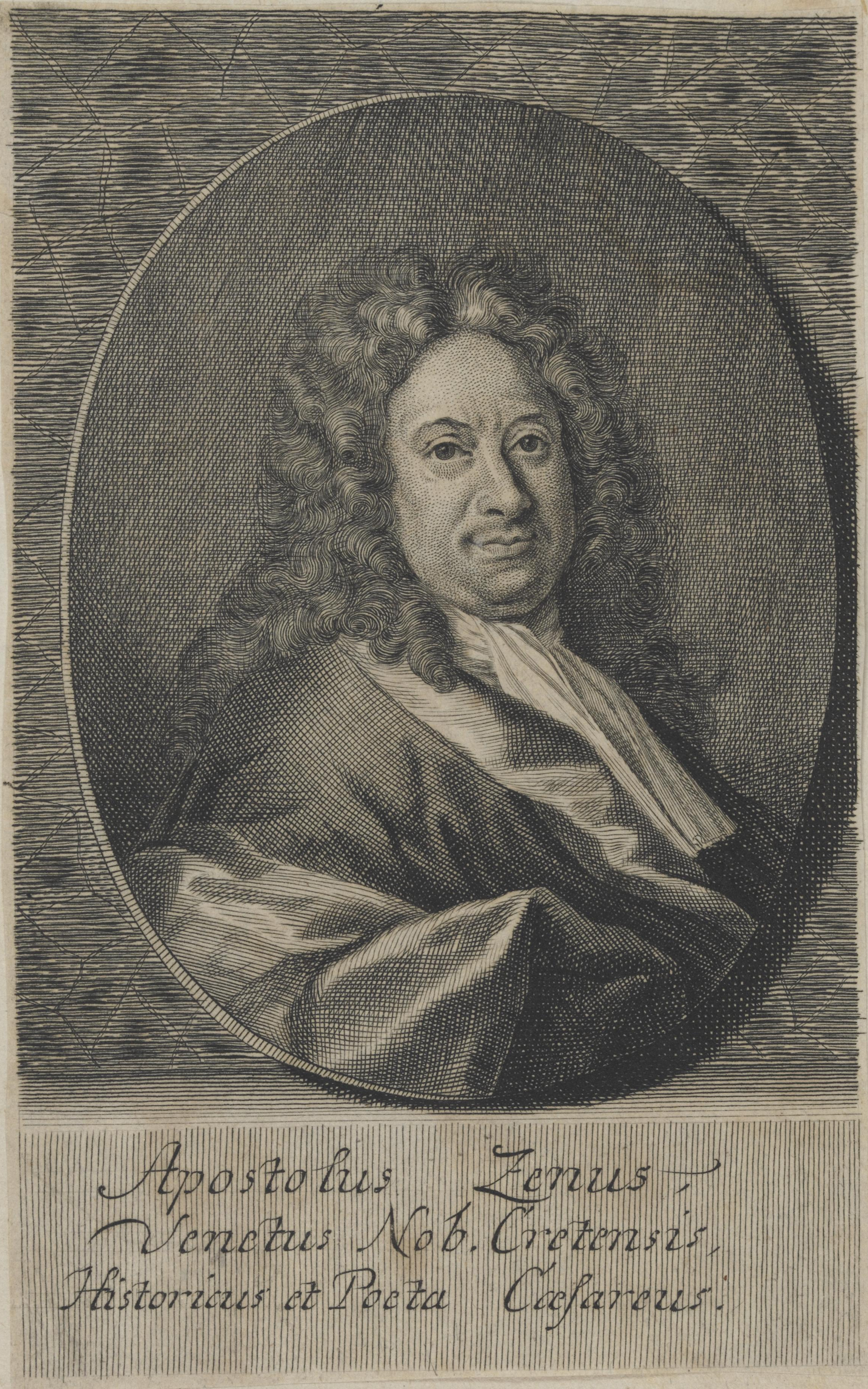
Apostolo Zeno

Temistocle is an opera in three acts composed by Nicola Porpora to an Italian libretto by Apostolo Zeno. It was first performed at the Hoftheater in Vienna on 1 October 1718. It is possibly the same opera that was performed on 30 May 1756 at the Teatre de la Santa Creu, Barcelona.

There is another version, also by Porpora, to a libretto by Metastasio, first performed in 1743, as well as another opera on the same subject by Francesco Manelli (1595–1670). Apostolic Zeno's libretto was also set to music by Marc'Antonio Ziani in 1701 and by Fortunato Chelleri in 1721.

== Roles and action ==
The action is set in the 5th century BC and concerns the Athenian general Themistocles who is in exile at the court of Artaxerxes I of Persia. It is based on book 1 of Thucydides' Historiae.

Artaserse, Temistocle, Palmide (lover of Temistocle), Eraclea (daughter of Temistocle), Cambise (favourite of Artaserse, in love with Palmide), Clearco (Athenian ambassador, in love with Eraclea), Arsace (captain of the guard).

The plot revolves around conflicts of loyalty, central to which is Temistocle's refusal to assist Artaserse in conquering Athens. This prompts the king to condemn him to death although at the end of the opera, impressed with Temistocle's sense of honour, he relents. Temistocle loves Palmide but since Artaserse wishes them to marry he cannot love her without the burden of feeling that royal approval requires him to betray his country.

== See also ==
- Temistocle (J.C. Bach)
