= RAAF (disambiguation) =

Royal Australian Air Force is the aerial warfare branch of the Australian Defence Force.

RAAF may also refer to:

- Roswell Army Air Field, later Walker Air Force Base
- Royal Auxiliary Air Force
- Royal Auxiliary Air Force (Police)
- Radical Action Antifascist, Polish organization

== See also ==
- Raaff
