= Panzacchi =

Italian opera singer

Domenico de' Panzacchi (1733 – after 1805) was an Italian operatic tenor and the first Arbace in Mozart's Idomeneo re di Creta. He was born in Imola. By 1780, his singing style was completely out of date, but Leopold Mozart advised his son to engage Panzacchi because he was such a good actor. He sang the title roles in Bernasconi’s Agelmondo (1760), Temistocle (1762) and Demofoonte (1766). Indeed, in the role created for him Panzacchi moves very easily between fear and hope, and the role was so influential that it was imitated many times. From 1760 until he was pensioned in 1782, he was one of the highest-paid tenors in Europe. He died in Bologna.
