= Raaff =

Raaff and de Raaff are surnames of Dutch origin. Notable people with the surname include:

- André de Raaff, Dutch pianist and composer
- Anton Raaff, German tenor
- Henk Raaff (born 1938), Dutch writer, journalist, and documentary filmmaker
- Klondyke Raaff, South African international rugby union player
- Robin de Raaff, Dutch composer and bassist
