= Gian Francesco de Majo =

Italian composer (1732–1770)

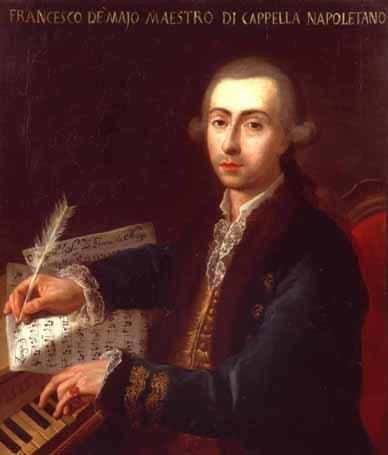
Gian Francesco de Majo

Gian Francesco de Majo (24 March 1732 – 17 November 1770) was an Italian composer. He is best known for his more than 20 operas. He also composed a considerable amount of sacred works, including oratorios, cantatas, and masses.

== Life and career ==
Born in Naples, Majo was the son of composer Giuseppe de Majo. He began his musical education with his father and then studied with his uncle Gennaro Manna and his great uncle Francesco Feo. At the age of 13, he became the harpsichordist at the royal chapel in Naples and at 15 began helping his father with his duties there as maestro di cappella. In 1758, he was made second organist at the royal chapel. On 7 February 1759, his first opera, Ricimero, re dei goti, premiered in Parma. This was soon followed by a series of successful operas mounted in Naples.

In 1761 and 1763, Majo traveled to Northern Italy, where he presented several of his compositions and studied for a short period with Giovanni Battista Martini. After a short time in Naples, he went to the court in Vienna, where he was commissioned to write the opera Alcide negli orti esperidi for the coronation of Joseph II, Holy Roman Emperor. He then spent some time in Mannheim and Madrid before returning to Italy in 1765.

Majo continued to work as an organist at the royal chapel in Naples, ultimately succeeding his father as maestro di cappella in 1767. Having contracted tuberculosis in 1760, Majo ultimately succumbed to the disease and died of it ten years later.

== Works ==
- Ricimero, re dei goti (1759) Parma
- Cajo Fabrizio (1760) Naples
- Astrea placata (1760) Naples
- Almeria (1761) Livorno
- Artaserse (1762) Venice
- Catone in Utica (1762) Turin
- Demofoonte (1763) Rome
- Alcide negli orti esperidi (1764) Vienna
- Ifigenia in Tauride (Majo) (1764) Mannheim
- Montezuma (1765) Turin
- La costanza fortunata (La constancia dichosa) (1765) Madrid
- Alessandro (nell'Indie) (1765) Mannheim
- Antigono (1767) Venice
- Antigona (1768) Rome
- Ipermestra (1768) Naples
- Adriano in Siria (1769) Rome
- Didone abbandonata (1770) Venice
- Eumene (1st act) (1771) Naples
