= Anna Lucia de Amicis =

Italian soprano

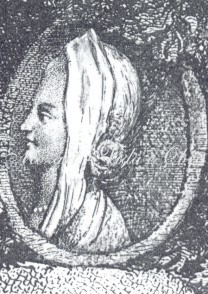

Anna Lucia de Amicis (c. 1733–1816), also known as Anna de Amicis-Buonsollazzi, was an Italian soprano.

== Life and career ==
The daughter of tenor Domenico de Amicis and soprano Rosalba Baldacci, Anna Lucia de Amicis was born in Naples, Italy in c. 1733. (Note: Saskia Willaert gives her date of birth as c. 1745 in Grove Music Online. However, this is contradicted in Leo Riemens and Karl-Josef Kutsch's Grosses Sängerlexikon which gives a more expansive account on the de Amicis family. Riemens & Kutch place the date of birth as c. 1733; a date also used in the Historical Dictionary of Music of the Classical Period.) She was the sister of opera singers Marianna De Amicis and Gaetano De Amicis. She received her initial vocal training from her parents, and began her career as a comic soprano touring Europe in the family's opera troupe. She later studied singing with Vittoria Tesi.

Anna's first appearance with the family company was in the Spring of 1754 in Geronimo Cordella's Il cicisbeo impertinente. In 1755 she appeared with her family in Baldassare Galuppi's La calamità dei cuori in Bologna. Other Eutopean cites she traveled to with the De Amicis troupe included Florence (1754), Lyon (1756–7), Paris (1758), Brussels (1759), Antwerp (1759), Ghent (1760), The Hague (1760), Amsterdam (1761), Dublin (1761–2), and London (1762–3).

She appeared in J. C. Bach's Orione in London, and went on to sing as prima donna in Dublin, Innsbruck and Naples. In Innsbruck she sang the female title role in Romolo ed Ersilia, the marriage celebration opera written by Johann Adolf Hasse for the marriage of Leopold of Habsburg and Spanish Infanta Maria Ludovica. For this role she gained a noted reputation. She was a favourite of both W. A. Mozart and his father, Leopold, and created the role of Giunia in Lucio Silla (Milan 1772).
