= Deyan Vatchkov =

Bulgarian opera singer

- Деян Вачков
- Born: April 8, 1979 (age 47); Sofia, Bulgaria
- Occupation: Opera singer

Deyan Vatchkov (Bulgarian: Деян Вачков; born April 8, 1979) is a Bulgarian bass opera singer. He has appeared at opera houses and festivals in Europe, North America and Asia, including Teatro alla Scala, the Arena di Verona, Teatro di San Carlo, La Fenice, Teatro Real, Seattle Opera, Opéra de Monte-Carlo, Oper Frankfurt, Opéra de Lausanne, National Centre for the Performing Arts in Beijing and Sofia Opera and Ballet.

== Early life and education ==
Vatchkov was born in Sofia, Bulgaria. He studied at the National Academy of Music "Prof. Pancho Vladigerov" in Sofia with Konstantin Karapetrov and Nedialko Nedialkov. In 2001, at the age of 21, he was admitted to the Academy for Young Singers of Teatro alla Scala, where his teachers included Leyla Gencer, Luciana Serra, Luigi Alva and Teresa Berganza.

Vatchkov won prizes at international singing competitions, including the first prize and the special Arrigo Boito Prize at the Iris Adami Corradetti Competition in Padua and the Verdi Prize and special Chamber Opera Prize at the Belvedere Competition in Vienna. These prizes led to his debut as Don Basilio in Rossini's The Barber of Seville in Vienna.

== Career ==
During his time at the La Scala academy, Vatchkov sang in Verdi's early opera Oberto, Conte di San Bonifacio, conducted by Nicola Luisotti. The production was also presented in Genoa. He subsequently appeared in Donizetti's Ugo, conte di Parigi at Teatro degli Arcimboldi and Teatro Donizetti in Bergamo, conducted by Antonino Fogliani.

His repertoire includes roles in operas by Giuseppe Verdi, Giacomo Puccini, Wolfgang Amadeus Mozart, Gaetano Donizetti, Vincenzo Bellini, Georges Bizet and Hector Berlioz. Among the roles listed in institutional biographies are Oberto in Oberto, Conte di San Bonifacio, Don Basilio in The Barber of Seville, Raimondo in Lucia di Lammermoor, Colline in La bohème, Escamillo in Carmen, Don Giovanni and Leporello in Don Giovanni, Figaro in The Marriage of Figaro, Don Pasquale in Don Pasquale, Dulcamara in L'elisir d'amore, Oroveso in Norma, Giorgio in I puritani, Attila in Attila, Zaccaria in Nabucco, Filippo II in Don Carlos, Ramfis and the King in Aida, Sparafucile in Rigoletto, Ferrando in Il trovatore, Fiesco in Simon Boccanegra, Timur in Turandot and Angelotti in Tosca.

Vatchkov has performed at many Italian opera houses, including Teatro alla Scala, Arena di Verona, Teatro di San Carlo in Naples, Teatro Carlo Felice in Genoa, Teatro Regio di Parma, Teatro Regio di Torino, Teatro Petruzzelli in Bari, Teatro Massimo in Palermo, Teatro Lirico di Cagliari, La Fenice in Venice, the Sferisterio Festival in Macerata, the Puccini Festival in Torre del Lago and the Ravenna Festival. Outside Italy, his engagements have included Opéra de Monte-Carlo, Theater an der Wien, Seattle Opera, Palm Beach Opera, Suntory Hall in Tokyo, Canadian Opera Company, Oper Frankfurt, Opéra de Lausanne, Teatro Real in Madrid, Palau de les Arts in Valencia, ABAO Bilbao Opera, Opera de Las Palmas de Gran Canaria, Opera de Tenerife, the Concertgebouw in Amsterdam, the Bolshoi Theatre in Moscow and the National Centre for the Performing Arts in Beijing.

In Bulgaria, Vatchkov has appeared with Sofia Opera and Ballet, State Opera Varna, State Opera Ruse and other institutions. At the Varna Opera he has appeared in productions such as Verdi's Macbeth, Puccini's Turandot and Bizet's Carmen.

== Conductors ==
Vatchkov has worked with conductors including Riccardo Muti, Lorin Maazel, Antonio Pappano, Nicola Luisotti, Daniel Oren, Roberto Abbado, Donato Renzetti, Daniele Gatti, Daniele Callegari, Antonello Allemandi, Gary Bertini, Carlo Franci, Gianluigi Gelmetti, Marcello Viotti, Giuliano Carella, Semyon Bychkov, Yuri Temirkanov, Nayden Todorov, Julian Kovatchev, Patrick Fournillier and Antonino Fogliani.

== Recordings ==
Vatchkov appears as Folco in Donizetti's Ugo, conte di Parigi, recorded live at Teatro Donizetti, Bergamo, in October 2003 and released by Dynamic. The recording is conducted by Antonino Fogliani and includes the Orchestra and Chorus of the Accademia Teatro alla Scala, the Chorus of Teatro Donizetti di Bergamo and the Fondazione Orchestra Gaetano Donizetti di Bergamo.
