= Ifigenia in Tauride (Majo) =

18th-century Italian opera by Gian Francesco de Majo

Ifigenia in Tauride is an opera in three acts by Gian Francesco de Majo to a libretto by Mattia Verazi. It was commissioned by Elector Palatine Carl Theodor, and premiered in 1764.
