= Romolo ed Ersilia =

Opera by Josef Mysliveček

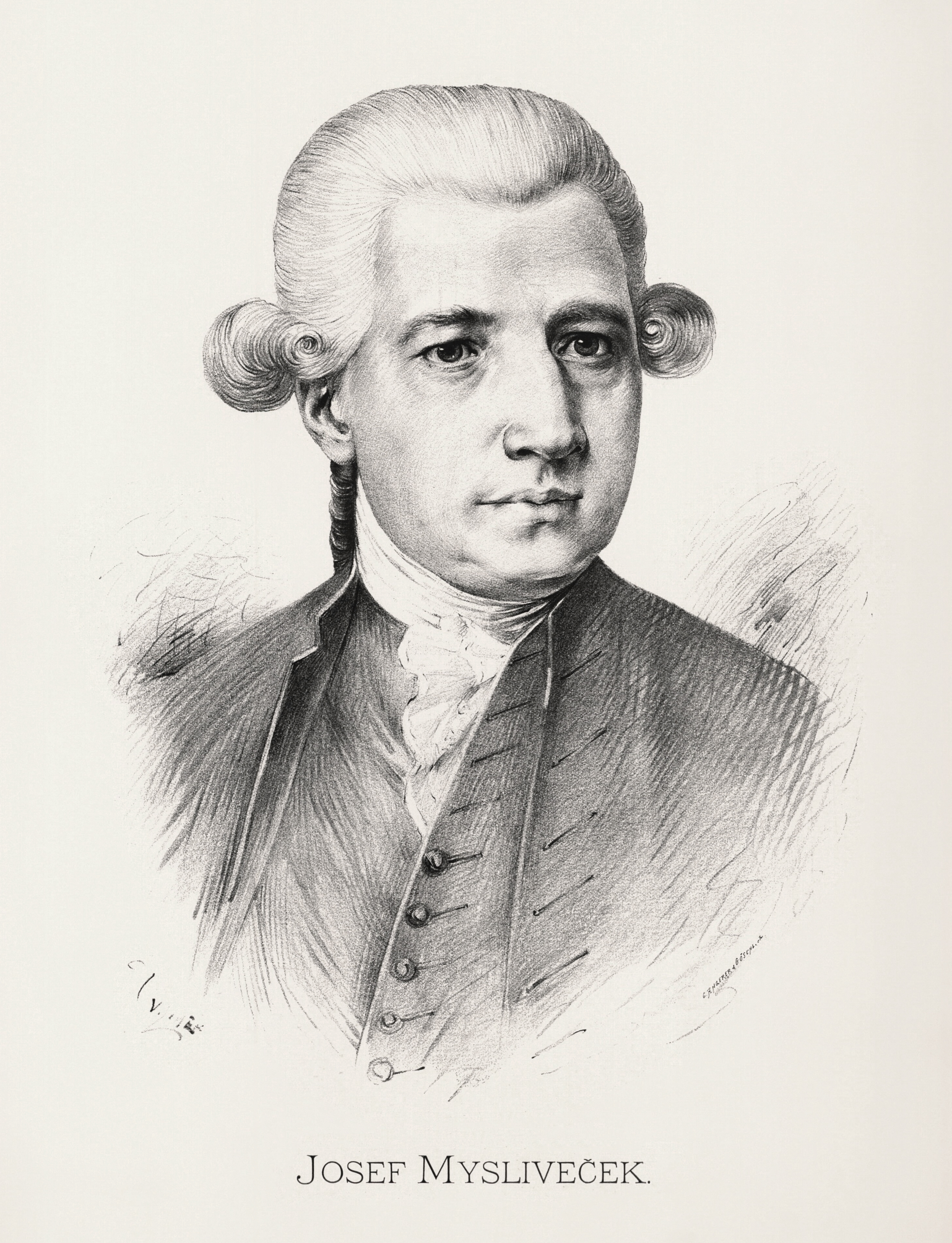
Josef Mysliveček

Romolo ed Ersilia ("Romulus and Ersilia") is an 18th-century Italian opera in 3 acts by the Czech composer Josef Mysliveček composed to a libretto by the Italian poet Metastasio first produced in Innsbruck in 1765 with music by Johann Adolf Hasse. The drama was one of Metastasio's last, shortest, and least popular. Mysliveček's setting of 1773 was the only other one known to have been produced during the remainder of the eighteenth century. It includes significant alterations, in particular the introduction of new arias that augment the importance of certain characters and the re-ordering of existing arias. The alterations are not attributable. This opera (and all the rest of Mysliveček's operas) belong to the serious type in Italian language referred to as opera seria and would usually feature the designation dramma per musica in librettos. In Mysliveček's day, the opening aria, "Questa è la bella face," the duet that concludes the first act, and the quartet that concludes the second act were famed for their brilliance. Romolo ed Ersilia was the first of Mysliveček's opera to be dominated by aria forms based on sonata form procedures, the most usual type for the rest of his career (extending to 1780).

== Performance history ==
Romolo ed Ersilia was first performed at the Teatro San Carlo in Naples on 13 August 1773 to commemorate the birthday of Maria Carolina, queen of Naples. The music for the production had to be composed hurriedly, since the composer was detained at the border of the Kingdom of Naples until mid-July for his lack of a passport. The management of the Teatro San Carlo resolved to have the three acts of the opera parceled out among three composers resident locally, however Mysliveček was able to resolve his difficulties at the border in time to fulfill his commission. The composer's haste is manifested in a large proportion of arias with a reduced scoring (strings only, or strings and winds without brass). The result was nonetheless very successful, and Mysliveček was immediately commissioned to compose an opera for the queen's birthday in 1774 (the opera Artaserse). In all, Mysliveček completed six more operas for the Teatro San Carlo before his death in 1781, which meant that more of his works were performed there during the 1770s than those of any other composer. This was quite a distinction, since the San Carlo was the most prestigious venue for the performance of Italian opera seria in the world. The cast of Romolo ed Ersilia included three distinguished singers: Gaspare Pacchierotti, Anna de Amicis-Buonsolazzi, and Giuseppe Tibaldi.

== Roles ==
Cast	Voice type	Premiere, 13 August 1773, Teatro San Carlo, Naples
Romolo, king and founder of Rome	mezzo-soprano castrato	Gaspare Pacchierotti
Ersilia, an illustrious Sabine princess betrothed to Romolo	soprano	Anna de Amicis-Buonsolazzi
Curzio, father of Ersilia	tenor	Giuseppe Tibaldi
Acronte, implacable enemy of Romolo, also in love with Ersilia	alto castrato	Pietro Santi
Valeria, a noble Roman lady, betrothed to Acronte, but abandoned by him	soprano	Margherita Gibetti
Ostilio, Roman patrician and friend of Romolo	soprano	Rosaria de Juliis (in a breeches role)

== Vocal set pieces ==
Act I, scene 1 - Chorus, "Sul Tarpeo propizie, e liete"
Act I, scene 2 - Aria of Romolo, "Questa è la bella face"
Act I, scene 3 - Aria of Ersilia, "Sorprender mi vorresti"
Act I, scene 5 - Aria of Curzio, "Prence, che affanno" [a non-Metastasian text]
Act I, scene 6 - Aria of Acronte, "Sprezzami pur, per ora ostenta"
Act I, scene 8 - Aria of Valeria, "Quel traditore intendo" [a non-Metastasian text]
Act I, scene 10 - Accompanied recitative for Romolo and Ersilia, "E tace Ersilia?"
Act I, scene 10 - Duet for Romolo ed Ersilia, "Ah, che vuol dir quel pianto"

Act II, scene 1 - Aria for Valeria, "Ah, perchè quando appresi"
Act II, scene 3 - Aria of Acronte, "Non respiro, che rabbia, e veleno" [a non-Metastasian text]
Act II, scene 4 - Aria of Curzio, "Nel pensar che padre io sono"
Act II, scene 5 - Accompanied recitative for Ersilia, "Dove m'ascondo?"
Act II, scene 6 - Aria of Ersilia, "Basta così, vincesti"
Act II, scene 7 - Accompanied recitative for Romolo and Ostilio, "Non resta, Roma io confido a te"
Act II, scene 7 - Aria of Romolo, "Ah, dille ch'io l'amo" [a non-Metastasian text]
Act II, scene 9 - Quartet of Ersilia, Romolo, Acronte, and Curzio, "Deh, invitati serba" [a non-Metastasian text]

Act III, scene 1 - Aria of Ersilia, "Sponde felici, addio" [a non-Metastasian text]
Act III, scene 5 - Aria of Valeria, "L'augellin dal visco uscito"
Act III, scene 6 - Chorus, "Serbate, o numi"
Act III, scene 6 - Cavatina of Romolo, "De' Numi clementi" [a non-Mestastasian text]
Act III, scene 9 - Aria of Curzio, "Ah, non più padre ti sono" [a non-Metastasian text]
Act III, scene 9 - Chorus, "Numi, che intenti siete"

== Score ==
The complete score of Romolo ed Ersilia is available for study online on the Italian website Internet Culturale in the form of a reproduction of a manuscript once in the possession of the Teatro San Carlo of Naples.

== Recordings ==
The overture to Mysliveček's Romolo ed Ersilia is included in a collection of symphonies and overtures by the composer recorded by the L'Orfeo Barockorchester, Michi Gaigg, conductor, CPO 777-050 (2004).

Two arias from the role of Ersilia ("Sorprender mi vorresti" and "Basta così, vincesti"), originally created for Anna de Amicis-Buonsolazzi, are included in the collection Arias for Anna de Amicis as sung by soprano Teodora Gheorghiu with Les Talens Lyriques, Christophe Rousset, conductor, Aperté AP021 (2011).
