= Elisabeth Wendling =

German operatic soprano

Elisabeth ("Lisl") Augusta Wendling, (née Sarselli; 20 February 1746 (baptised) – 10 January 1786) was a German soprano, for whom Mozart wrote the role of Electra in his opera Idomeneo, re di Creta.

Wendling was born in Mannheim. There were four musicians in the original Idomeneo from the Wendling family. She usually sang with her sister-in-law Dorothea Wendling, after her début in 1762 in Sofonisba by Tommaso Traetta. Later, she occasionally sang as the prima donna, most famously as Anna in Günther von Schwarzburg (1777) by Ignaz Holzbauer.

In a letter, Mozart says he has been introduced to her by Cannabich and that she was very good-looking, and a good musician. Wendling had been greatly praised by Mozart's father and thus was chosen for the role of Electra.

In 1785 she was engaged to sing in Alessio Prati's Armida abbandonata, but fell ill and had to hand the role to her niece "Gustl" Wendling; she never sang in public again. She died in Munich.
