= Jörg Schneider (tenor) =

Austrian tenor

Jörg Schneider (born 1969) is an Austrian operatic tenor.

== Life ==
Born in Wels, Schneider received his first musical training with the Vienna Boys' Choir and studied in Vienna with Elfriede Obrowsky. In 1995 he became an ensemble member at the Staatstheater Wiesbaden. For the years 1997 to 2000 he moved as an ensemble member to the Deutsche Oper am Rhein Düsseldorf. Since 2007 Jörg Schneider has been a member of the Vienna Volksoper. At the Theater an der Wien he made his debut in autumn 2012 as Iro in Il ritorno d'Ulisse in patria (production: Claus Guth). In 2012/13 he sang David in Die Meistersinger von Nürnberg at the Tokyo Bunka Kaikan and Belmonte in Mozart's Die Entführung aus dem Serail in Düsseldorf as well as Flamand in Capriccio at the Müpa Budapest. In 2014, Schneider sang Oskar in the world premiere of Tales from the Vienna Woods by HK Gruber (based on the same-named play by Ödön von Horváth) at the Bregenz Festival, a performance that was repeated at the Theater an der Wien. Schneider made his debut at the Gran Teatre del Liceu in Barcelona as Leukippos in Daphne, and at the Vienna State Opera he made his role debut as Narraboth in Salome. Since January 2016 he has been the director of the "Friends of Operetta" concert series in St. Pölten. Since September 2016, he has been a singing teacher at the Prayner Conservatory of Music and Dramatic Arts in Vienna. Since September 2017 he is a member of the Vienna State Opera. In summer 2018 he made his debut at the Salzburg Festival, in summer 2019 in Glyndebourne.

Guest engagements took Schneider primarily to Italy, namely to the Teatro Lirico di Cagliari, the Teatro Massimo Bellini, the Teatro Claudio Abbado, the Teatro Comunale di Firenze and the Maggio Musicale Fiorentino, the Teatro alla Scala di Milano, the Teatro Regio di Parma, the Teatro Massimo (Palermo), Teatro dell'Opera di Roma, the Teatro Regio di Torino, the Teatro Filarmonico di Verona, in Germany, among others, to the Festspielhaus Baden-Baden, the Deutsche Oper Berlin, the Semperoper Dresden, the Staatsoper Stuttgart, in Belgium to the La Monnaie Brussels, in Spain to the Teatro Real Madrid, in Switzerland to the Opernhaus Zürich, and in East Asia to Tokyo and Hong Kong.

Conductors with whom he has worked include Claudio Abbado, Bertrand de Billy, Semyon Bychkov, Dennis Russell Davies, Theodor Guschlbauer, Gustav Kuhn Zubin Mehta, Riccardo Muti, Christof Perick, Christophe Rousset, Peter Schneider, Pinchas Steinberg, Christian Thielemann, Edo de Waart.

== Concerts ==
Schneider's repertoire also includes the tenor parts in J. S. Bach's St John Passion', Joseph Haydn's The Creation, Mozart's Requiem, Mendelssohn Bartholdy's Die erste Walpurgisnacht, R. Schumann's Dichterliebe, Verdi's Messa da Requiem and Berlioz's Te Deum. Schneider has made guest appearances at venues including the Dresden Philharmonic, Royal Albert Hall London, the Carnegie Hall New York, the Wiener Musikverein, the Wiener Konzerthaus, the Brucknerhaus in Linz, Radio France and the Concertgebouw Amsterdam.

== Recordings ==
- Alfred – Die Fledermaus by Johann Strauss II (with Edita Gruberová) at Nightingale Classics
- Stanislaus – Der Vogelhändler by Carl Zeller Seefestspiele Mörbisch
- Marquese Sebastiani – Der lustige Krieg (Johann Strauss)
