= Pierre Audi =

English-Lebanese theatre director and artistic director (1957–2025)

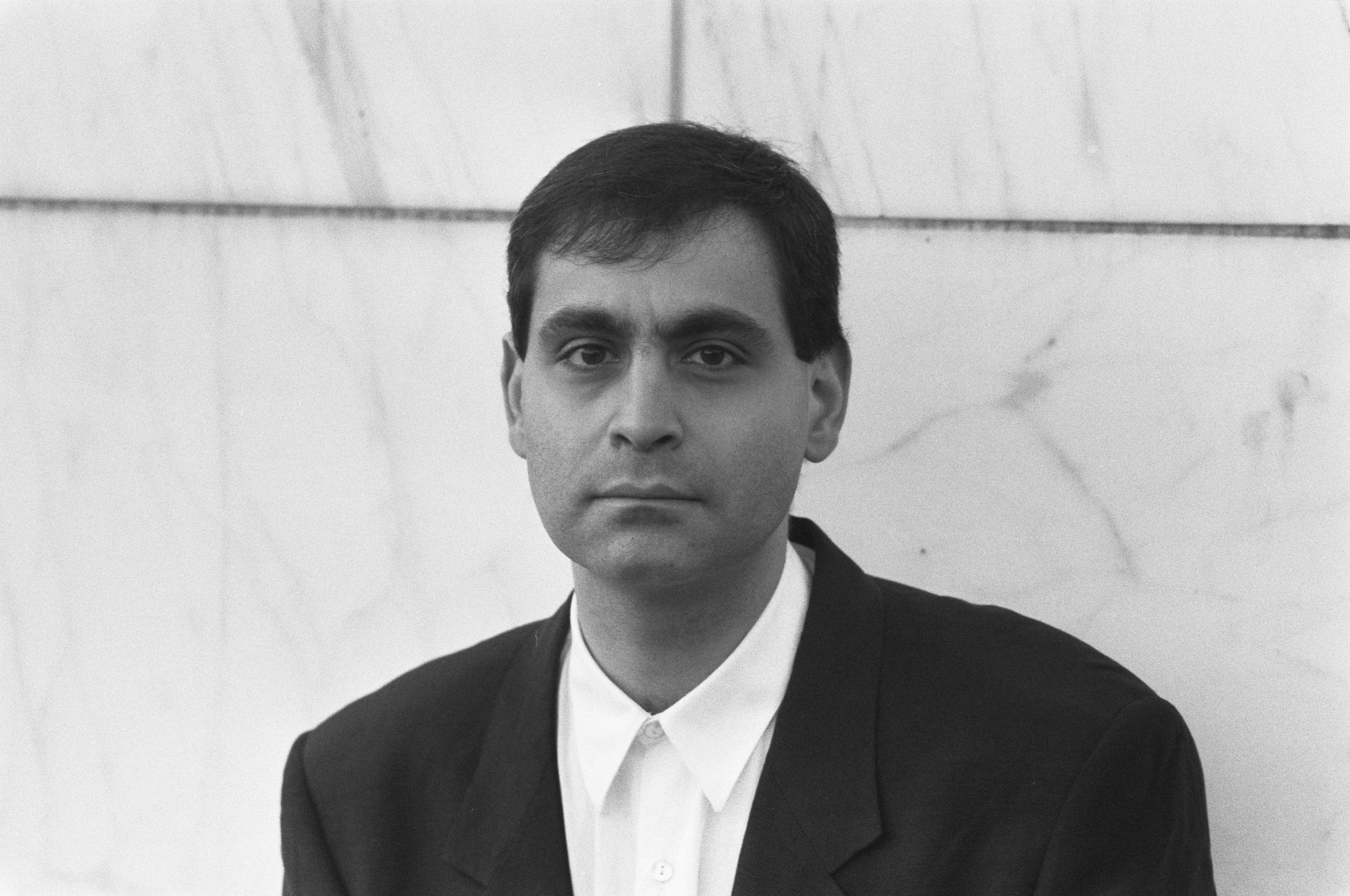
- Audi in 1988
- Born: 9 November 1957; Beirut, Lebanon
- Died: 3 May 2025 (aged 67); Beijing, China
- Occupations: Theatre director; opera director
- Years active: 1979–2025

Pierre Audi (9 November 1957 – 3 May 2025) was an English-Lebanese theatre director and artistic director.

== Early life ==
Audi was born on 9 November 1957, the eldest of three children born to Lebanese banker Raymond Audi and Andrée Michel Fattal. Audi's family were originally from Saida, but he attended the French Lycée in Beirut. While still at school, he initiated a cinema club and invited speakers including the film directors Pier Paolo Pasolini and Jacques Tati.

For family reasons, he moved to Paris in France and there attended the Collège Stanislas de Paris. At the age of 17, Audi together with his family moved to England. He studied history at Exeter College, Oxford. In his last year at Oxford during November 1977, he directed an Oxford University Dramatic Society production of Timon of Athens by William Shakespeare at the Oxford Playhouse.

== Almeida Theatre ==
In 1979, Audi founded the Almeida Theatre, an experimental theatre in Islington, North London based in a derelict former Salvation Army and toy factory building supported by university friends and vigorous fundraising. He directed many productions at the Almeida Theatre in the 1980s. His inspiration was Peter Brook’s Théâtre des Bouffes du Nord in Paris, and he invited that company to the Almeida in 1982; other alternative visiting companies included the Théâtre de Complicité, Shared Experience, and Cheek by Jowl.

His first mainstream opera production was the UK premiere of Verdi’s Jérusalem in March 1990, which also launched Paul Daniel's association with Opera North.

== Dutch National Opera and later functions ==
From London, Audi moved to Amsterdam, where he was the artistic director of the Dutch National Opera from 1988 to 2018. Audi's productions with the Dutch National Opera included the first complete performance of the Ring Cycle in the Netherlands, the Lorenzo Da Ponte operas by Mozart, Francis Poulenc's Dialogues des Carmélites, Peter Greenaway's and Louis Andriessen's Rosa – A Horse Drama and Writing to Vermeer, Alexander Knaifel's Alice in Wonderland, and Claude Vivier's Rêves d'un Marco Polo which was paired with the world premiere performances of RAAFF in 2004. RAAFF is an opera by Dutch composer Robin de Raaff who dedicated the opera to Pierre Audi. Audi directed RAAFF after commissioning the opera for DNO and the Holland Festival. A directorial registration is available on YouTube. Audi commissioned the opera Life with an Idiot by Alfred Schnittke.

From 2005 to 2014, Audi also was the artistic director of the Holland Festival. In October 2015, he became the artistic director of Park Avenue Armory, while continuing his work as artistic director of the Dutch National Opera. In September 2018, he left the Dutch National Opera after a thirty-year tenure, and became director of the Festival International d'Art Lyrique d'Aix-en-Provence.

Nicholas Payne described Audi’s opera productions as tending "towards the cerebral. He read widely and drew on a deep reservoir of cultural references". By contrast, his stagings were pared "back to the simplest elements, but also to add ambiguities which complicated them with questions".

== Death ==
Audi died suddenly on 3 May 2025 in Beijing, where he had been working on a production. He was 67.

== Distinctions ==
- Knight of the Order of the Dutch Lion (2000)
- Prince Bernhard Cultural Fund Award (2001)
- Johannes Vermeer Award (2009)
