= Anton Raaff =

German tenor

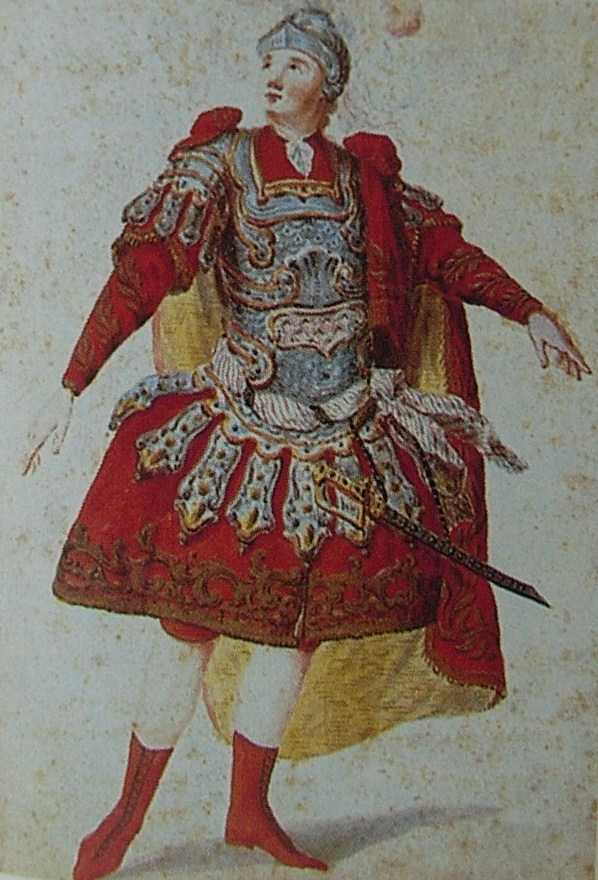
Anton Raaff in the title role of Idomeneo in Munich

Anton Raaff (6 May 1714 – 28 May 1797) was a German tenor from Gelsdorf near Bonn.

== Career ==
Raaff studied at the Jesuit school in Bonn where the Elector of Bavaria, Clement Augustus, heard him singing and paid for him to train professionally. Raaff was brought to the capital, Munich, where he was engaged on an annual salary of 2000 thalers. From Munich he was sent to Bologna to study the Italian style so he would be able to perform in the prevailing opera seria style.

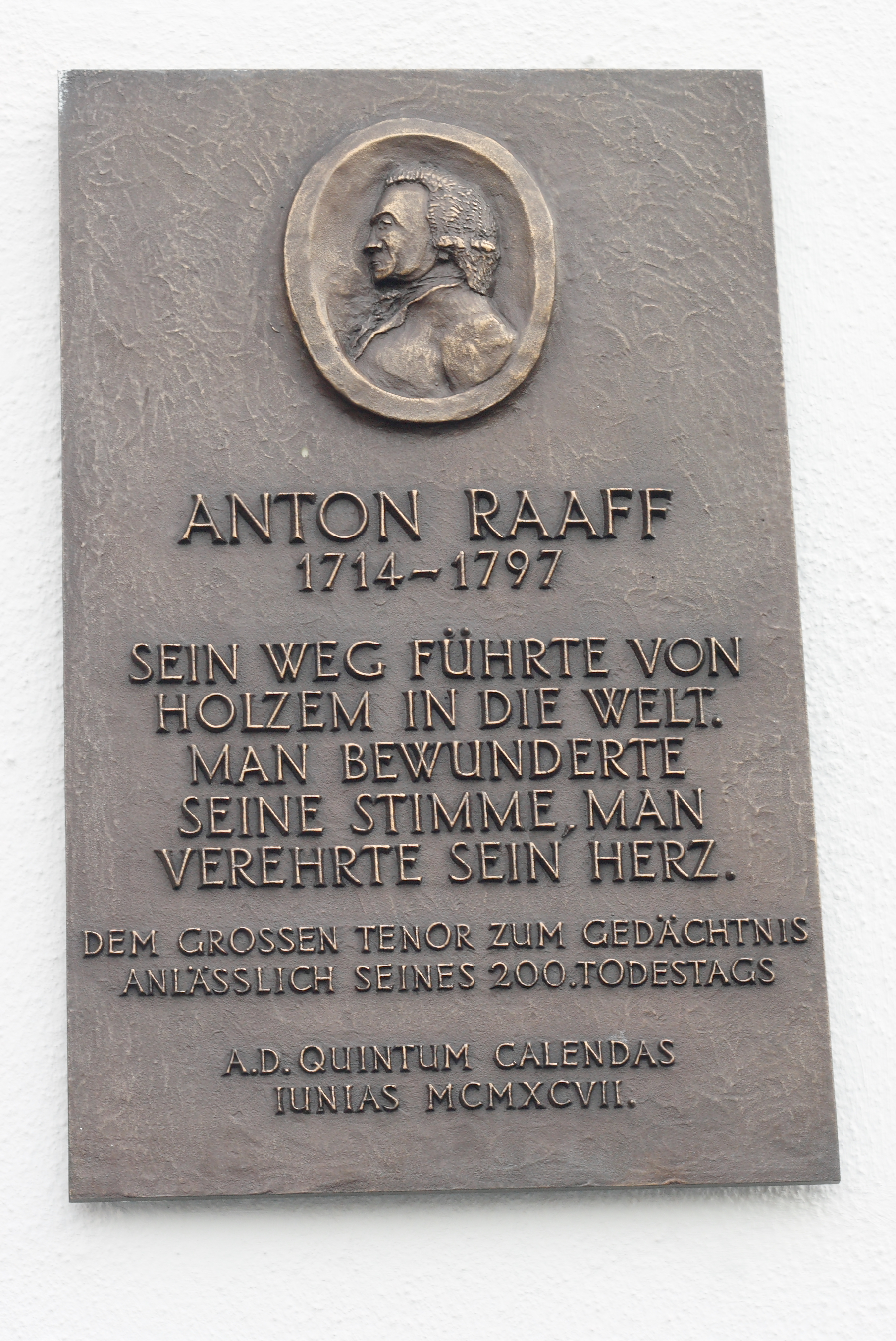
Memorial plaque for Raaff in Wachtberg

In 1738 he was sent to Vienna to sing at the wedding ceremonies for Empress Maria Theresa, after which he was sent on a long period of overseas travel, during which time his fame grew.

From 1752 to 1755 he was in Lisbon, and from 1755 to 1759 in Madrid, where he sang with Farinelli. He worked in Naples from 1759 to 1769, after which he returned to Germany. Raaff sang the title role in the premiere of Mozart's 1781 opera Idomeneo; this was his last stage role. He spent his remaining years teaching and died in Munich in 1797.

In the opinion of Schubart, his was the most beautiful male voice of all time, and his diction perfect in several languages. When Elector Charles Theodore asked him to return home, he said he was not sure the Elector would be happy with him any more; indeed, his talents had begun to wane and Schubart noticed that Raaff's vibrato had become extremely marked.

== An opera about Anton Raaff ==
Dutch composer Robin de Raaff wrote an opera about Anton Raaff and Mozart which centres around the problematic but creative relationship at the time of the world premiere of Mozart's opera Idomeneo at the court of Munich. The title of the opera is RAAFF and is scored for 6 singers, an actor, mixed choir, and symphony orchestra (including a fretless bass guitar, a Fender Rhodes and a drum kit). The opera was premiered in 2004 and was commissioned by the Dutch National Opera and the Holland Festival and performed in the Westergasfabriek in Amsterdam directed by Pierre Audi to whom the opera is dedicated. A directorial registration is available on YouTube.
