= Holland Festival =

Oldest and largest performing arts festival in the Netherlands

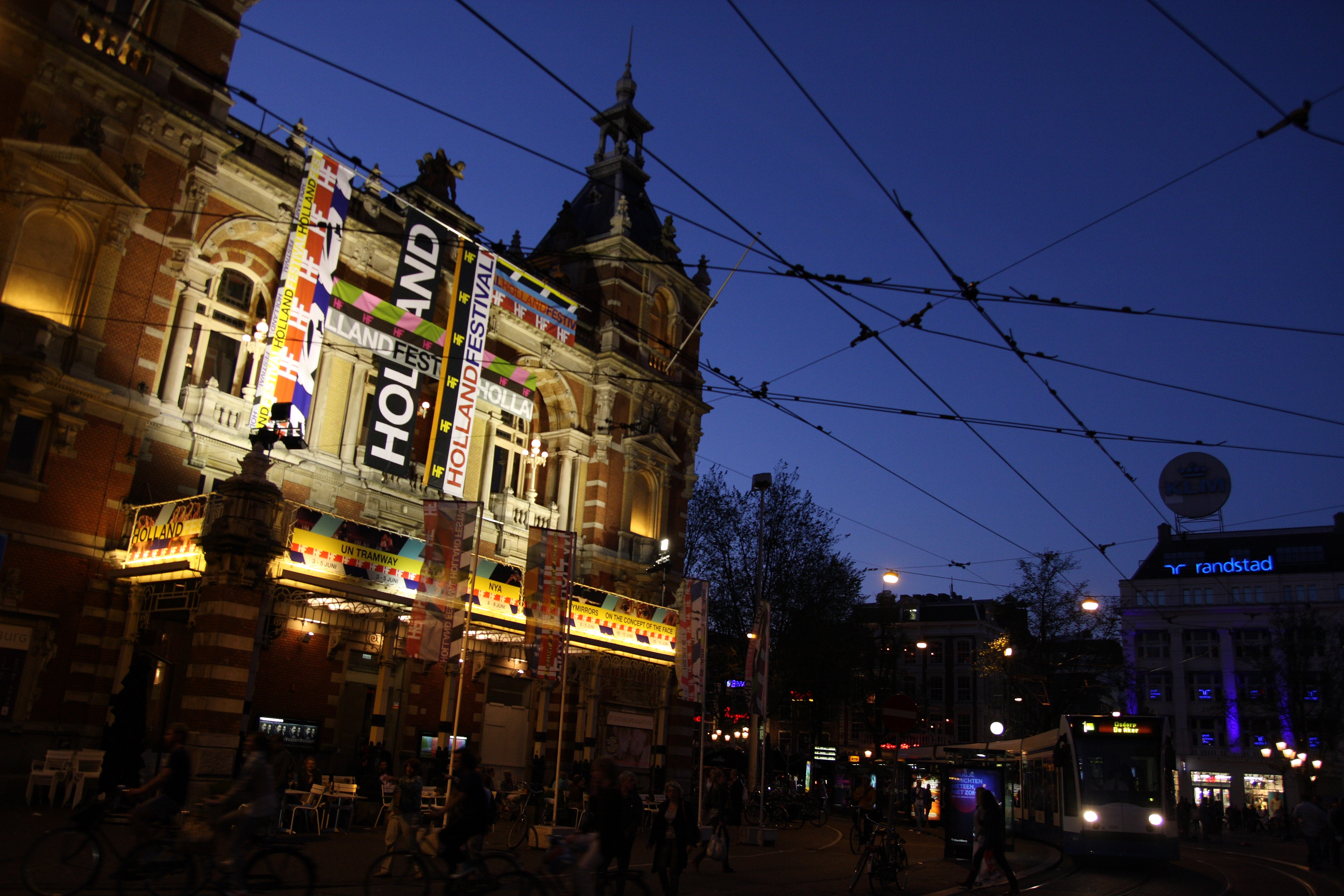
Stadsschouwburg with a banner of the Holland Festival in 2011

The Holland Festival (Dutch pronunciation: [ˈɦɔlɑnt ˈfɛstivɑl]) is the oldest and largest performing arts festival in the Netherlands. It takes place every June in Amsterdam. It comprises theatre, music, opera and modern dance. In recent years, multimedia, visual arts, film and architecture were added to the festival roster.

Performances take place in Amsterdam venues such as the city theatre, the opera, the Concertgebouw and Muziekgebouw concert halls and the Westergas factory site. Each edition is loosely themed, and the programme features both contemporary work and classical pieces presented with a modern edge.

== History ==
Newsreel of Willem van Otterloo conducting the Residentie Orchestra in a people's concert during the 1951 Holland Festival

The festival was founded in 1947 and features some of the world's top artists and performers, as well as lesser-known performers. Notable world premieres included Karlheinz Stockhausen's Helicopter String Quartet. The festival introduced Maria Callas in the Netherlands, and was also the first to successfully set up a large symphonic tribute to Frank Zappa with "200 motels-the suite" in 2000 (after failed attempts to have Zappa perform himself in the festival in 1981).

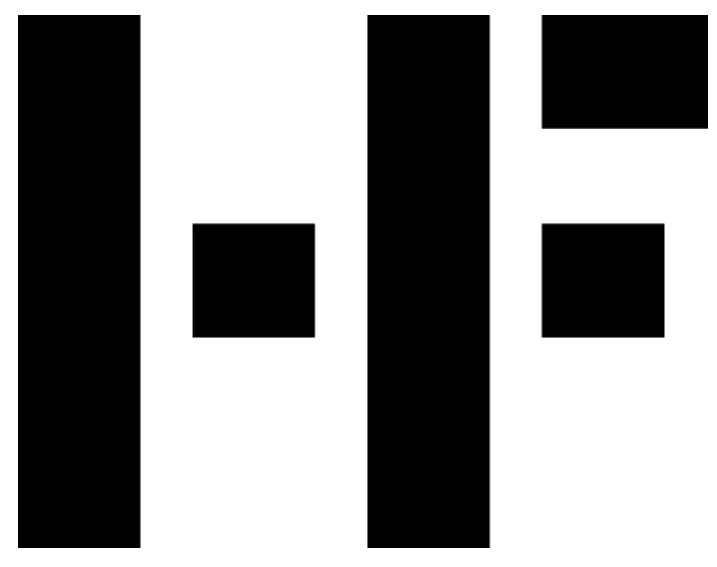
Logo of the Festival, launched in 2019

From 2005, the festival included off-series called EarFuel, EyeFuel and MindFuel. Outreach initiatives to new audiences include successful non-western concerts such as an Umm Kalsoum tribute by Egyptian star Amal Maher in 2010.

From 2005 to 2014 the Holland Festival was curated by artistic director Pierre Audi, followed by Ruth Mackenzie in 2014.
