= List of concerti grossi =

This list of concerti grossi contains work in the concerto grosso genre.

- Concerto Grosso (Gregori), a 1698 work by Giovanni Lorenzo Gregori
- Twelve concerti grossi, op.6 (Corelli), (probably 1680s, published 1714) work by Arcangelo Corelli
- Concerto Grosso (Torelli), 1709 work by Giuseppe Torelli
- 7 Concerto a Quattro Violini op. 7 (1710): 7 Concerto a Quattro Violini (Concerti grossi) Giuseppe Valentini
- Concerto Grosso (Manfredini), 1718 work by Francesco Manfredini
- Brandenburg Concertos, a set of 6 works, from 1721 or before, by Johann Sebastian Bach
- Concerto Grosso (Locatelli), 1721 work by Pietro Locatelli
- Three sets of concerti grossi, op.2 (1732), op.3 (1733) and op.7 (1746) by Francesco Geminiani
- Concerti Grossi dalle Sonate di Corelli, work by Giovanni Benedetto Platti (1697-1763)
- Handel concerti grossi Op.6, a 1739 work by George Frideric Handel
- Handel concerti grossi Op.3, a collection of various preexisting works by George Frideric Handel assembled by his publisher John Walsh in 1743
- Concerto Grosso No. 1 (Bloch), a 1925 work for string orchestra and piano by Ernest Bloch
- Concerto Grosso (Martinu) H.263 a 1937 work by Bohuslav Martinů (for woodwinds, 2 horns, 2 pianos and strings)
- Concerto in E-flat (Dumbarton Oaks), 1937-8 work by Igor Stravinsky
- Double Concerto for Two String Orchestras, Piano, and Timpani (Martinů), H. 271 (1938)
- Concerto Grosso (Giannini), a 1946 work by Vittorio Giannini for string orchestra
- Concerto Grosso (Vaughan Williams), a 1950 work by Ralph Vaughan Williams (the orchestra is split into three sections: Concertino, Tutti, and Ad Lib)
- Concerto Grosso No. 2 (Bloch), a 1952 work by Ernest Bloch
- Concerto Grosso (Tamberg), a 1956 work by Eino Tamberg
- Concerto Grosso (Villa-Lobos), a 1959 work by Heitor Villa-Lobos
- Concerto Grosso (Cowell), a 1963 work by Henry Cowell
- Concerto Grosso (Williamson), a 1965 work by Malcolm Williamson
- Concerto Grosso (Eshpai), a 1966 work by Andrei Eshpai
- Concerto Grosso (New Trolls), 1971 work by New Trolls
- Concerto Grosso (Françaix), a 1976 work by Jean Françaix
- Six concerti grossi dating from 1977-1993 by Alfred Schnittke
- Concerto Grosso, a 1985 work by Vladimír Godár
- Concerto Grosso, a 1985 work by Ellen Taaffe Zwilich
- Concerto Grosso (Gudmundsen-Holmgreen) a 1990 work by Pelle Gudmundsen-Holmgreen
- Concerto Grosso (Glass), a 1992 work by Philip Glass
- Palladio (Concerto Grosso for String Orchestra), suite from the 1996 album Diamond Music by Karl Jenkins
- Two concerti grossi by Krzysztof Penderecki, No. 1 for three cellos and orchestra (2000), No. 2 for five clarinets and orchestra (2004)
- Concerto Grosso No. 1 Op.28 (2011), work by Airat Ichmouratov
- Concerto Grosso, a 2013 work by Svitlana Azarova (for violin, viola solo and strings)
- Concerto Grosso No. 1, a 2017 work by Jordan Kabat (for 2 flutes, harpsichord, percussion and strings)

== See also ==
- Concerto grosso
- Concertino (composition)
- Double, Triple and Quadruple concertos
