= Karl Richter (conductor) =

German conductor (1926–1981)

- Karl Richter, in 1959
- Born: 15 October 1926; Plauen, Germany
- Died: 15 February 1981 (aged 54); Munich, West Germany
- Occupations: Orchestral and choral conductor; Organist and harpsichordist
- Spouse: Gladys Müller (m. 1952)
- Children: 2

Karl Richter (15 October 1926 – 15 February 1981) was a German conductor, choirmaster, organist, and harpsichordist.

== Early life and education ==
Karl Richter was born in Plauen to Christian Johannes Richter, a Protestant pastor, and Clara Hedwig Richter. He studied first in Dresden, where he was a member of the Dresdner Kreuzchor and later in Leipzig, where he received his degree in 1949. He studied with Günther Ramin (former teacher of another prominent Bach specialist, organist Helmut Walcha), Karl Straube and Rudolf Mauersberger.

== Career ==
In 1949, the year of his graduation, Richter became organist at St. Thomas Church, Leipzig, where Johann Sebastian Bach had been the music director for 27 years. During his tenure there, he was witness to the inauguration of Bach's new grave and prepared a special performance of Bach's "St. Anne" Prelude and Fugue in E-flat for the reception.

In 1952, after marrying Gladys Müller, with whom he had two children, Tobias and Simone, he moved to Munich, where he taught organ at the University of Music and Performing Arts Munich and was cantor and organist at St. Mark's Church.

In 1954, Richter founded the Münchener Bach-Chor (Munich Bach Choir), and soon after, the Münchener Bach-Orchester (Munich Bach Orchestra), which rapidly became established as a prominent international ensemble and noted for its interpretations of the works of J. S. Bach and other composers. In the 1960s and 1970s he recorded often and toured Japan, the United States, Canada, Latin America, Eastern Europe and the Soviet Union. Richter served as conductor of both ensembles from 1954 until 1981. In 1977, a recording of the First Movement from Bach's Brandenburg Concerto No. 2 in F by the Munich Bach Orchestra under Richter was selected by NASA to be included on the Voyager Golden Record, a gold-plated copper record that was sent into space on the Voyager space craft. The record contained sounds and images which had been selected as examples of the diversity of life and culture on Earth.

Richter played and conducted a wide range of music (sacred works from Heinrich Schütz to Max Reger, as well as the symphonic and concerto repertoire of the Classical and Romantic periods – even including Bruckner symphonies), but is best remembered for his interpretations of Johann Sebastian Bach and George Frideric Handel. Richter's performances were known for their soul-searching, intense and festive manner. He avoided the fluctuations in tempo that were previously characteristic of the prevailing Romantic manner of interpreting Bach, and devoted much attention to the woodwinds and to balance in general. His recordings from 1958 to 1970 are notable for "discipline, rhythmic tautness and expressive intensity".

Richter viewed Baroque music as fundamentally impromptu and subjective in nature, explaining in an interview that he had been told his performance of Bach's St. Matthew Passion sounded different from the one he had performed last year. He viewed this observation in a positive light, stating, "It's bad if you play a work with disdainful routine because you have to, and if you no longer have any thoughts or ideas about it." Musicians who played with him analogized that performing Baroque music with Richter was like playing ping-pong because the back and forth is what directed the piece.

As well as a conductor, Richter is also renowned as a virtuoso harpsichordist and organist. He undertook at least two American concert tours, the second in late 1958.

== Later years and death ==
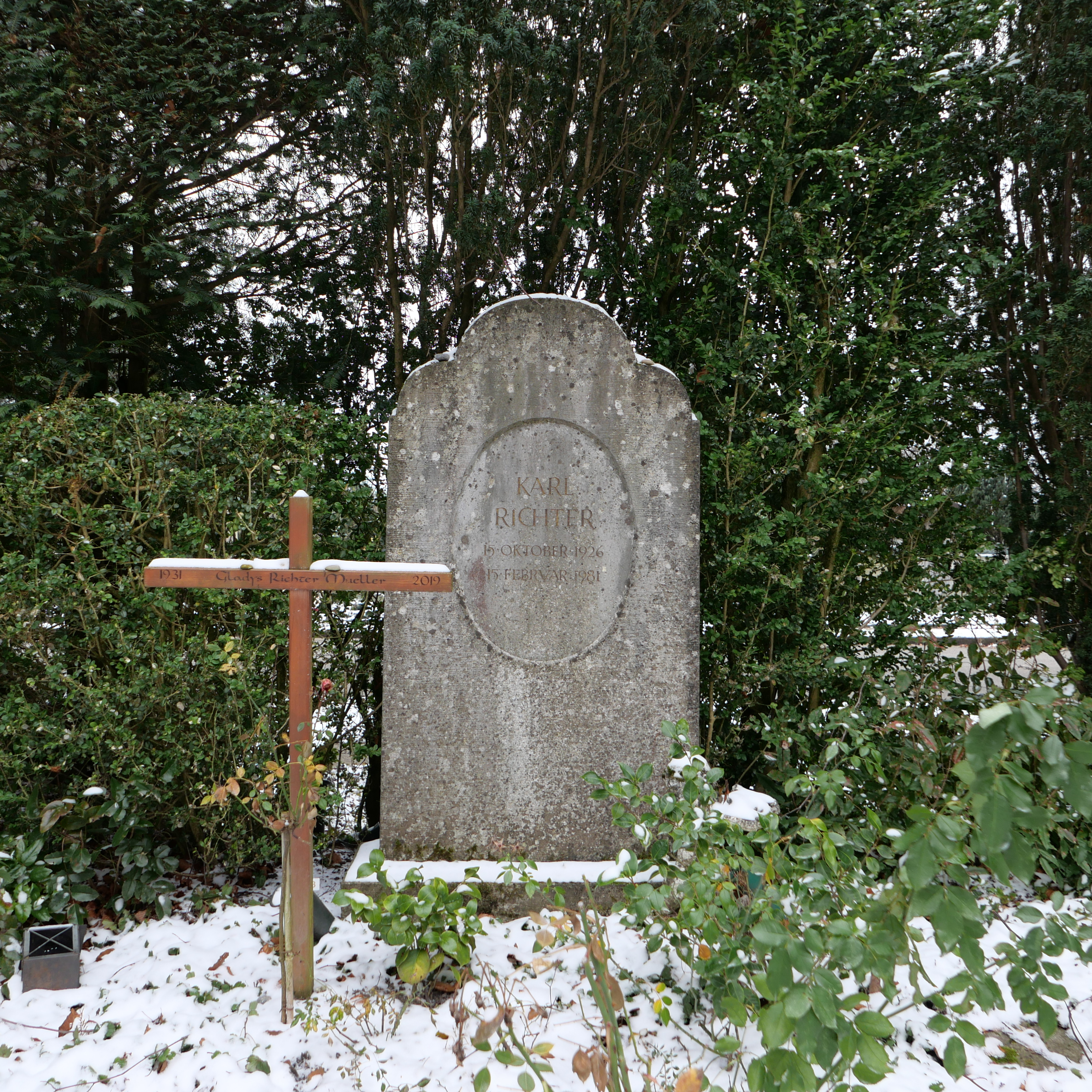
Richter's grave

In 1971, Richter suffered a heart attack and thereafter suffered increasing problems with his vision. Consequently, he began to memorize as many works as he could before he might lose his sight. Eventually he had eye surgery, of which he was initially skeptical, but it was effective.

When asked about the energy-draining self-imposed burden of work he set himself, he would reply "My time is now" and "We Richters don't grow old."

Richter suffered a fatal heart attack in a hotel in Munich in 1981. He was buried in the Enzenbühl cemetery in Zürich eight days later. His widow Gladys, born in 1931, died in 2019 and was buried in the same grave.

== Selected works ==
Although focusing mainly on the German Baroque period – and particularly on Johann Sebastian Bach's works, Richter recorded a wide amount of music. His discography includes works by Alessandro Scarlatti, Handel, Telemann, C. P. E. Bach and Joh. Chr. Bach (Johann Sebastian's sons), Haydn, Gluck, Mozart and Mendelssohn, and Beethoven's Mass in C major. He also recorded organ works by Liszt and Reger related to Bach, and Brahms' chorale preludes for organ.

=== Recordings ===
==== Works by J. S. Bach ====
A Bach specialist and renowned interpreter, in 1958 he recorded the full St Matthew Passion for Archiv Produktion, leading himself the Münchener Bach-Orchester, the Münchener Bach-Chor and the Münchener Chorknaben. He would record the work again in later years (1979, published 1980).

- Johann Sebastian Bach: Matthäuspassion. 4-LP set. Archiv Produktion (IX. Forschungsbereich: Das Schaffen Johann Sebastian Bachs, Serie D: Passionen und Oratorien), 1959, Catalog No. SAPM 198 009/012.
- J. S. Bach: Matthäus-Passion. 4-LP. Archiv Produktion, 1980, Catalog Nos. 2565 123 to 126 (single LPs); 2723 067 (box set).

In 1961, he recorded Bach's Mass in B minor, BWV 232, in a triple LP for Archiv Produktion, and the Magnificat, BWV 243 for the same label. His Magnificat was also released in another LP featuring BWV 78 on Side A.

- Johann Sebastian Bach: Missa [...] (Messe in h-moll), BWV 232. 3 LP. Archiv Produktion (IX. Forschungsbereich: Das Schaffen Johann Sebastian Bachs, Serie C: Messe und Magnificat), 1961, Catalog No. 198 190 to 192.
- Johann Sebastian Bach: Magnificat, BWV 243. LP. Archiv Produktion (IX. Forschungsbereich: Das Schaffen Johann Sebastian Bachs, Serie C: Messe und Magnificat), 1961, Catalog No. 13 078.
- Johann Sebastian Bach: Jesu, der du meine Seele (Kantate am 14. Sonntag nach Trinitatis), BWV 78; Magnificat fü Soli, Chor und Orchester D-dur, BWV 243. LP. Archiv Produktion (IX. Forschungsbereich: Das Schaffen Johann Sebastian Bachs, Serie A: Kantaten – Serie C: Messe und Magnificat), 1963, Catalog No. 198 197.

In 1963, he recorded the complete Musical Offering, BWV 1079 for Archiv:

- Johann Sebastian Bach: Musikalisches Opfer, BWV 1079. Archiv Produktion (IX. Forschungsbereich: Das Schaffen Johann Sebastian Bachs, Serie M: Musikalisches Opfer und Kunst der Fuge), 1963, Catalog No. 198 320. This recording includes two versions of the Canon a 2 "Quaerendo invenietis".

In the next two years, he and his orchestra and choir recorded other major vocal works by Bach: excerpts from St John Passion and the Christmas Oratorio; extracts of the former were also released the next year by Deutsche Grammophon.

- Johann Sebastian Bach: Johannes-Passion, Chöre und Arien. LP. Deutsche Grammophon, 1964, Catalog No. SLPEM 136 475.
- Johann Sebastian Bach: Weihnachts-Oratorium, BWV 248. 3-LP set. Archiv Produktion (IX. Forschungsbereich: Johann Sebastian Bach), 1965, Catalog Nos. 198 353 to 355.
- »Jauchzet, frohlocket!«. Auszüge aus dem Weihnachts-Oratorium (J. S. Bach). LP. Deutsche Grammophon, 1966, Catalog. No. SLPEM 136 498.

Regarding his activity as organist and harpsichordist, among his first recordings (in addition to Handel's concertos, see below) are two works by Bach at the organ of Holy Mary of the Ottobeuren Abbey (1958):

- Johann Sebastian Bach: Dorische Toccata und Fuge, BWV 538; Sei gegrüßet, Jesu gütig, BWV 768. LP. Telefunken, 1958, Catalog No. NT 847.
  - An alternative edition exists, but it bears no date (Cat. No. 6.41350 AH).

He then recorded four LPs with Deutsche Grammophon from 1964 to 1969, and another one in 1978 (for Archiv Produktion, published in 1980).

- Johann Sebastian Bach: Toccata und Fuge d-moll BWV 565; Triosonate No. 2 c-moll BWV 526; Präludium und Fuge D-dur BWV 532; Fantasie und Fuge BWV g-moll BWV 542. Karl Richter at the Marcussen & Søn organ of the Jægersborg Kirke, Copenhagen, Denmark. LP. Deutsche Grammophon, 1964, Catalog No. SLPM 138 907.
- Johann Sebastian Bach: Orgelwerke • Organ Works • Œuvres pour orgue, Vol. 1. Karl Richter at the Marcussen & Søn organ of the Jægersborg Kirke, Copenhagen, Denmark. LP. Deutsche Grammophon, 1967, Catalog No. SLPM 139 321. Includes BWV 529, 548, 552, 645, 650.
- Johann Sebastian Bach: Orgelwerke • Organ Works • Œuvres pour orgue, Vol. 2. Karl Richter at the Marcussen & Søn organ of the Jægersborg Kirke, Copenhagen, Denmark. LP. Deutsche Grammophon, 1967, Catalog No. SLPM 139 325. Includes BWV 540, 543, 544, 654.
- Johann Sebastian Bach: Orgelwerke • Organ Works • Œuvres pour orgue, Vol. 3. Karl Richter at the Marcussen & Søn organ of the Jægersborg Kirke, Copenhagen, Denmark. LP. Deutsche Grammophon, 1968, Catalog No. SLPM 139 387. Includes BWV 525, 546, 588, 767.
- Johann Sebastian Bach: Dorische Toccata und Fuge • Passacaglia. Karl Richter at the Große Silbermann-Orgel of the Freiburg Cathedral. LP. Archiv Produktion, 1980, Catalog No. 2533 441. Includes BWV 538 and 582.

In 1969, he recorded a selection of harpsichord works by Bach for Deutsche Grammophon, including the Pastorale in F major, BWV 590 (originally for organ).

- Johann Sebastian Bach: Italienisches Konzert, BWV 971; Fantasie, BWV 906; Chromatische Fantasie und Fuge, BWV 903; Toccata, BWV 915; Pastorale, BWV 590. Deutsche Grammophon, 1970, Catalog No. 2530 035.

In 1972 he recorded a split double album with organist Albert de Klerk for Telefunken, which included organ works by Bach and other Baroque composers.

- Karl Richter • Albert de Klerk: Norddeutsche Arp Schnitger-Orgeln. 2 LP. Telefunken, 1972, Catalog No. 11 521/1-2. Richter played the Schnitger organ in the Lutheran church of Norden, East Frisia and recorded Bach's Fantasy in G major, BWV 572; Trio sonatas no. 6 in G major, BWV 530 and no. 3 in D minor, BWV 527; and Pastorale in F major, BWV 590.

Record labels such as Decca or Deutsche Grammophon occasionally recorded his organ recitals. For example:

- Karl Richter: Bach Organ Recital. Karl Richter at the organ of Victoria Hall, Geneva, Switzerland. LP. Decca Records, 1960, Catalog No. SXL 2219.
- Karl Richter: Bach Organ Recital, Vol. 1. LP. Deutsche Grammophon, 1964, Catalog No. SLGM 1277.
- Karl Richter: Bach Organ Recital, Vol. 2. LP. Deutsche Grammophon, 1967, Catalog No. SMG 1425.
- Karl Richter: Bach Organ Recital, Vol. 3. LP. Deutsche Grammophon, 1967, Catalog No. SMG 1460.

==== Works by G. F. Handel ====
In 1952, he recorded Handel's Concerti grossi, op. 6 with the Bamberger Symphoniker directed by Fritz Lehmann, for Archiv Produktion:

- Georg Friedrich Händel: Concerti Grossi, op. 6 nr. 1 G-dur, nr. 2 F-dur, nr. 3 e-moll, nr. 4 a-moll. 2-LP set. Archiv Produktion (X. Forschungsbereich: Werke von Georg Friedrich Händel, Serie A: Orchesterkonzerte), 1952, Catalog No. APM 14 291. Soloists: Otto Büchner / 1st violin; Franz Berger / 2nd violin; Hans Melzer / cello; Karl Richter / harpsichord; director: Fritz Lehmann.
- Georg Friedrich Händel: Concerti Grossi, op. 6 nr. 5 D-dur, nr. 6 g-moll. LP. Archiv Produktion (X. Forschungsbereich: Werke von Georg Friedrich Händel, Serie A: Orchesterkonzerte), 1952, Catalog No. APM 14 013. Soloists: Otto Büchner / 1st violin; Franz Berger / 2nd violin; Hans Melzer / cello; Karl Richter / harpsichord; director: Fritz Lehmann.
- Georg Friedrich Händel: Concerti Grossi, op. 6 nr. 7 B-dur, nr. 8 c-moll. LP set. Archiv Produktion (X. Forschungsbereich: Werke von Georg Friedrich Händel, Serie A: Orchesterkonzerte), 1952, Catalog No. APM 14 014. Soloists: Otto Büchner / 1st violin; Franz Berger / 2nd violin; Hans Melzer / cello; Karl Richter / harpsichord; director: Fritz Lehmann.
- Georg Friedrich Händel: Concerti Grossi, op. 6 nr. 9 F-dur, nr. 10 d-moll. LP set. Archiv Produktion (X. Forschungsbereich: Werke von Georg Friedrich Händel, Serie A: Orchesterkonzerte), 1952, Catalog No. APM 14 015. Soloists: Otto Büchner / 1st violin; Franz Berger / 2nd violin; Hans Melzer / cello; Karl Richter / harpsichord; director: Fritz Lehmann.
- Georg Friedrich Händel: Concerti Grossi, op. 6 nr. 11 A-dur, nr. 12 H-dur. Archiv Produktion (X. Forschungsbereich: Werke von Georg Friedrich Händel, Serie A: Orchesterkonzerte), 1952, Catalog No. APM 14 016. Soloists: Otto Büchner / 1st violin; Franz Berger / 2nd violin; Hans Melzer / cello; Karl Richter / harpsichord; director: Fritz Lehmann.

Also regarding Handel's works, in 1959 he recorded the organ concertos for Decca Records, with the Karl Richter Chamber Orchestra. Richter lead the orchestra from the keyboard while playing the organ, which he also did in his Musical Offering recording (see above).

- Handel: Organ Concertos, Vol. 1, nos. 1 2 3 4. Karl Richter with the Karl Richter Chamber Orchestra. LP. Decca Records, 1959, Catalog No. SXL 2115.
- Handel: Organ Concertos, Vol. 2, nos. 5 6 7 8. Karl Richter with the Karl Richter Chamber Orchestra. LP. Decca Records, 1959, Catalog No. SXL 2187.
- Handel: Organ Concertos, Vol. 3, nos. 9 10 11 12. Karl Richter with the Karl Richter Chamber Orchestra. LP. Decca Records, 1959, Catalog No. SXL 2201.

==== Works by other composers ====
Richter recorded not only works by Johann Sebastian Bach, but also by some of his sons. Specifically, he recorded C. P. E. Bach's Symphony No. 1 in D major and Johann Christian Bach's Symphony in B major, Op. 18, No. 2 for Telefunken, leading the Munich Bach Orchestra. The recording also includes Mozart's Symphony in A major, KV 201.

- C. P. E. Bach • Joh. Chr. Bach • Mozart: Symphonien D-dur • B-dur • A-dur. Telefunken, 1965, Catalog No. SAWT 9420-B.

Also regarding C. P. E. Bach, he would later record his first four symphonies for Archiv:

- Carl Philipp Emanuel Bach: Vier Orchester-Symphonien, WQ 183 (1775–76). Archiv Produktion (XI. Forschungsbereich: Die deutsche Vorklassiker), 1970, Catalog No. 2533 050.

In 1964, he had recorded a selection of organ works by Mozart, Brahms and Liszt for Deutsche Grammophon:

- Wolfgang Amadeus Mozart • Johannes Brahms • Franz Liszt. Karl Richter an der Steinmeyer-Orgel im Herkules-Saal, München. LP. Deutsche Grammophon, 1964, Catalog. No. SLPM 138 906. Includes Mozart's Fantasy for organ in F minor KV 608, Brahms' Choral preludes op. 122 and Liszt's Prelude and Fugue on B–A–C–H S 260.

In 1971, he led the Munich Bach Orchestra and the Munich Bach Choir in Beethoven's Mass in C major, released by Deutsche Grammophon:

- Ludwig van Beethoven: Messe C-dur op. 86. LP. Deutsche Grammophon, 1971, Catalog No. 139 446.

=== Legacy, reissues and reprints ===
The whole set of Bach's organ works as recorded by Richter was reissued in 2005 by Deutsche Grammophon in a 3-CD box set:

- J. S. Bach • Karl Richter: Orgelwerke • Organ Works • Œuvres pour orgue. 3-CD box set. Deutsche Grammophon (series The Originals), 2005, Catalog No. 477 5337.

In 2020, Richter's 1958 Archiv recording of Bach's St Matthew Passion has been praised by Baroque specialist and harpsichordist Trevor Pinnock, in a videoblog interview for Deutsche Grammophon.

Also in 2020, Richter's complete recordings on Archiv Produktion and Deutsche Grammophon were reissued in a limited edition, 97-CD & 3 Blu-Ray Audio box set.

- Karl Richter. Complete Recordings on Archiv and Deutsche Grammophon. 97-CD + 3 Blu-Ray Audio set. Deutsche Grammophon, 2020, Ltd. Edition.
  - CD 1–64: Johann Sebastian Bach, including two recording for each of the Mass in B minor (1961 & 1969) and St Matthew Passion (1958 & 1979) and the rehearsals for the 1965 recording of the Christmas Oratorio; the St John Passion; the cantatas for all the Sundays and feast days; the Magnificat; the Brandenburg Concertos and his praised recording of the Musical Offering; and the 20 spiritual songs from Schemelli's Song-Book. Also a virtuoso organist and harpsichordist, he recorded major works by Bach for solo keyboard instruments, including the Goldberg Variations; the Chromatic Fantasia and Fugue in G minor, BWV 903; the Passacaglia and Fugue in C minor, BWV 582; the Toccata and Fugue in D minor, BWV 565; the "Dorian" Toccata and Fugue in D minor, BWV 538; the Canzona in D minor, BWV 588; the Pastorale in F major, BWV 590 (at the harpsichord); the chorale partitas O Gott, du frommer Gott, BWV 767 and Sei gegrüsset, Jesu gütig, BWV 768; the Great Fantasia and Fugue in G Minor, BWV 542.
  - CD 65: C. P. E. Bach's orchestral symphonies nos. 1 to 4.
  - CD 66: Ludwig van Beethoven's Mass in C major.
  - CD 67–68: Christoph Willibald Gluck's Orfeo ed Euridice.
  - CD 69–92: works by George Frideric Handel, including Messiah, HVW 56 (1964, in German and 1972, in English), Samson, HWV 57, Giulio Cesare in Egitto, HWV 17, and airs from Serse, HWV 40; several overtures and concerti, including the six concerti grossi, op. 3 and the twelve concerti grossi, op. 6 (two times, in 1952 and 1970); the Music for the Royal Fireworks HWV 351; the Chaconne with 21 variations HWV 435; and the second and third concerto a due cori HWV 333 and 334.
    - CD 88 also includes three concerti for solo instrument, strings and basso continuo (TWV 51:e1, Anh. 51:G1 and 51:c1) by Georg Philipp Telemann.
  - CD 93: Joseph Haydn's Symphony No. 94 in G major "Surprise", Hob. I:94 and No. 101 in D major "The Clock", Hob. I:101.
  - CD 94: Alessandro Scarlatti's cantata Su le Sponde del Tebro H. 705 + excerpts from J. S. Bach's St John and St Matthew Passion; from Handel's Messiah and Joshua, HWV 64; from Haydn's The Creation, Hob. XXI:2 and The Seasons, Hob. XXI:3; and from Felix Mendelssohn's Elias, op. 70.
  - CD 95: Wolfgang Amadeus Mozart's Fantasia in F minor K. 608, Johannes Brahms' 11 chorale preludes op. post. 122 and Franz Liszt's Prelude and Fugue on the name B–A–C–H S 260 (recorded in 1964).
  - CD 96: another recording of Liszt's Prelude and Fugue (1954) and Max Reger's Fantasia and Fugue on the name B–A–C–H.
  - CD 97: a collection of 18 European Christmas carols recorded in 1961.
  - CD 98 = BR Audio 1: J. S. Bach's St Matthew Passion (1958), St John Passion, Christmas Oratorio and Mass in B minor (1961).
  - CD 99 = BR Audio 2: J. S. Bach's Cantatas for all the Sundays and Feast Days in the Church, pt. 1 (Advent and Christmas; Easter; Ascension Day, Whitsun and Trinity, 1st part).
  - CD 100 = CR Audio 3: J. S. Bach's Cantatas for all the Sundays and Feast Days in the Church, pt. 2 (Ascension Day, Whitsun and Trinity, 2nd part; Sundays after Trinity, I & II).

== Sources ==
- Martin, Johannes (2005). Karl Richter in München, 1951–1981: Zeitzeugen erinnern sich: eine Dokumentation (in German). Dettelbach: Conventus Musicus. ISBN 978-3-00-016864-2. OCLC 70677090.
- Roland Wörner: Karl Richter – Musik mit dem Herzen. Eine Dokumentation aus Anlass seines 75. Geburtstags. Panisken Verlag, München 2001, ISBN 3-935965-01-X.
- Roland Wörner: Karl Richter: Musikalischer Brückenbauer: Eine Wirkungsgeschichte. edition baptisma, Heilbronn 2016, ISBN 978-3-00-053255-9.
- Roland Wörner: Karl Richter: Musical bridges into the transcendent: A history of his impact. English Edition. edition baptisma, 2023, ISBN 978-3-00-074457-0.
- External links
- J.S. Bach.org – Karl Richter Recordings
- Playing Bach, Was He a Pioneer or a Reactionary?
- Bach Cantatas Website – Karl Richter Biography
- New York Times – Karl Richter, conductor, dies at 54 leader of Münich Bach Orchestra
- Chronicle recordings & tours Karl Richter and MBC / MBO 1951–1959
- Chronicle recordings & tours Karl Richter and MBC / MBO 1960–1965
- Chronicle recordings & tours Karl Richter and MBC / MBO 1966–1969
- Chronicle recordings & tours Karl Richter and MBC / MBO 1970–1975
- Chronicle recordings & tours Karl Richter and MBC / MBO 1977–1981
- Weblog Karl Richter in Munich (1951–1981) – Artists and Bach-chorister remember his work and influence on their career
- "Karl Richter 1921–1981, His Life & Work", by Roland Wörner, from the DVD "Karl Richter in München 1951–1981, Part 1: Solisten • Konzerte • Tourneen", by Johannes Martin, 2006, ISBN 978-3-00-019277-7
- https://www.youtube.com/watch?v=vMSwVf_69Hc Brandenburg Concerto BWV 1050, the harpsichord solo.
