= Concerto grosso =

Form of baroque music

The concerto grosso (pronounced [konˈtʃɛrto ˈɡrɔsso]; Italian for big concert(o), plural concerti grossi [konˈtʃɛrti ˈɡrɔssi]) is a form of Baroque music in which the musical material is passed between a small group of soloists (the concertino) and full orchestra (the ripieno, tutti or concerto grosso). This is in contrast to the solo concerto which features a single solo instrument with the melody line, accompanied by the orchestra.

== History ==
The form developed in the late seventeenth century, although the name was not used at first. Alessandro Stradella seems to have written the first music in which two groups of different sizes are combined in the characteristic way. The name was first used by Giovanni Lorenzo Gregori in a set of ten compositions published in Lucca in 1698.

The first major composer to use the term concerto grosso was Arcangelo Corelli. After Corelli's death, a collection of twelve of his concerti grossi was published. Not long after, composers such as Francesco Geminiani, Pietro Locatelli, Giovanni Benedetto Platti and Giuseppe Torelli wrote concertos in the style of Corelli. He also had a strong influence on Antonio Vivaldi.

Corelli, Concerto Grosso Op. 6 No. 4 - 1. Adagio - Allegro
Performed by the Advent Chamber Orchestra

Two distinct forms of the concerto grosso exist:

1. the concerto da chiesa (church concert)
2. the concerto da camera (chamber concert)

The concerto da chiesa alternated slow and fast movements; the concerto da camera had the character of a suite, being introduced by a prelude and incorporating popular dance forms. (See also Sonata for a discussion about sonatas da camera and da chiesa.) These distinctions blurred over time. Corelli composed 48 trio sonatas, 12 violin and continuo sonatas, and 12 concerti grossi.

Six sets of twelve compositions, published between 1888 and 1891 by Friedrich Chrysander, are authentically ascribed to Corelli, together with a few other works.

- Opus 1: 12 sonate da chiesa (trio sonatas for 2 violins and continuo) (Rome 1681)
- Opus 2: 12 sonate da camera (trio sonatas for 2 violins and continuo) (Rome 1685)
- Opus 3: 12 sonate da chiesa (trio sonatas for 2 violins and continuo) (Rome 1689)
- Opus 4: 12 sonate da camera (trio sonatas for 2 violins and continuo) (Rome 1694)
- Opus 5: 12 Suonati a violino e violone o cimbalo (6 sonate da chiesa and 6 sonate da camera for violin and continuo) (Rome 1700) The last sonata is a set of variations on La Folia.
- Opus 6: 12 concerti grossi (8 concerti da chiesa and 4 concerti da camera for concertino of 2 violins and cello, string ripieno, and continuo) (Amsterdam 1714)

Corelli's concertino group consisted of two violins and a cello, with a string section as ripieno group. Both were accompanied by a basso continuo with some combination of harpsichord, organ, lute or theorbo. George Frideric Handel wrote several collections of concerti grossi (Op. 3 and Op. 6), and several of the Brandenburg Concertos by Johann Sebastian Bach also loosely follow the concerto grosso form.

The concerto grosso form was superseded by the solo concerto and the sinfonia concertante in the late eighteenth century, and new examples of the form did not appear for more than a century. In the twentieth century, the concerto grosso has been used by composers including Igor Stravinsky, Ernest Bloch, Ralph Vaughan Williams, Bohuslav Martinů, Malcolm Williamson, Henry Cowell, Alfred Schnittke, William Bolcom, Heitor Villa-Lobos, Andrei Eshpai, Eino Tamberg, Krzysztof Penderecki, Jean Françaix, Airat Ichmouratov, Philip Glass and Paul Ben-Haim. While Edward Elgar may be considered a modern composer, his romantic Introduction and Allegro strongly resembled the instrumentation setup of a concerto grosso.

== Concertino ==
A concertino, literally "little ensemble", is the group of soloists in a concerto grosso. This is opposed to the ripieno and tutti which is the larger group contrasting with the concertino.

Though the concertino is the smaller of the two groups, its material is generally more virtuosic than that of the ripieno. Further, the concertino does not share thematic material with the ripieno, but presents unique ideas. This contrast of small group to large group and one thematic group against another is very characteristic of Baroque ideology—similar to terraced dynamics where the idea is significant contrast.

== See also ==
- List of concerti grossi
