= Concerti grossi, Op. 3 (Handel) =

Compositions by George Frideric Handel

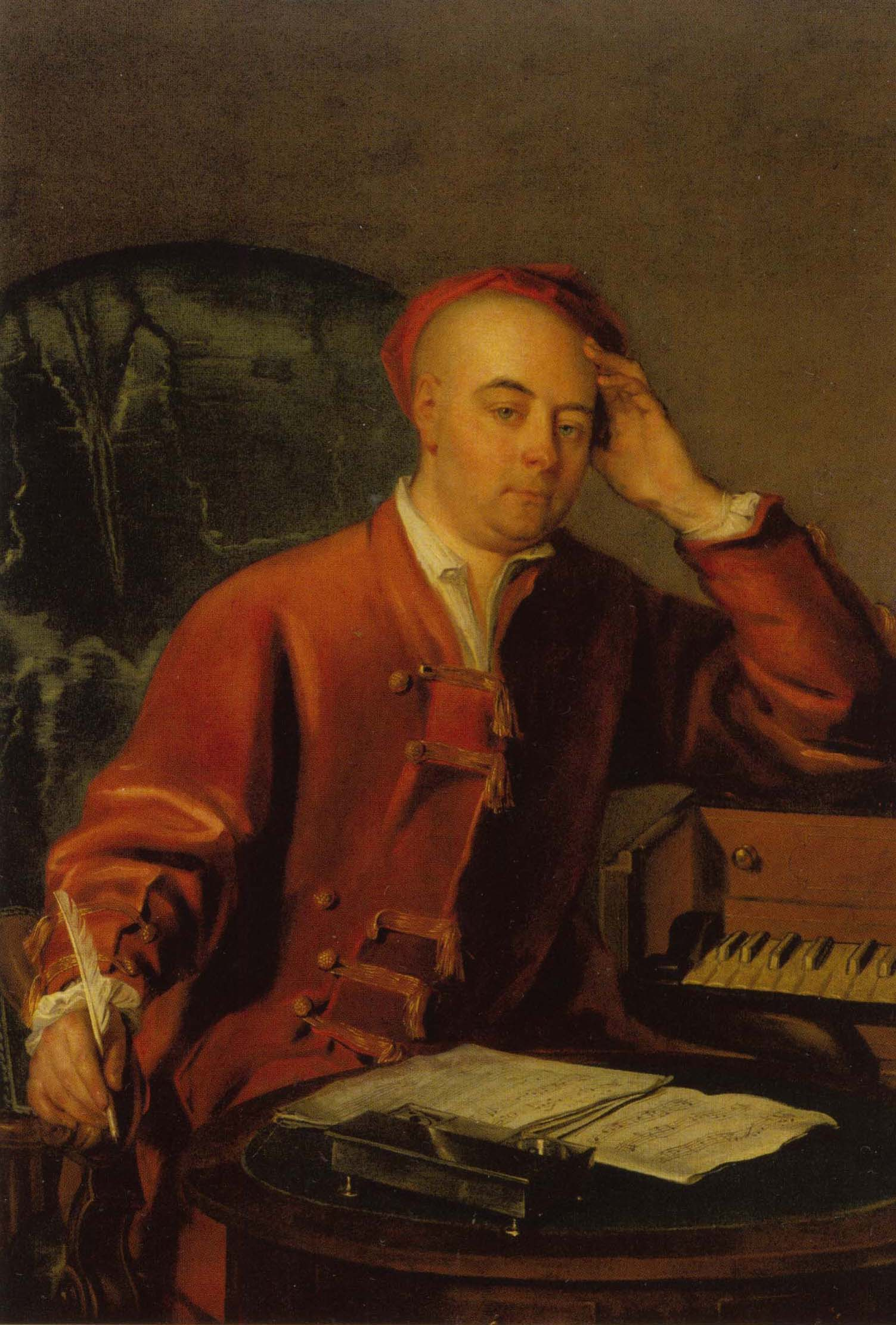
George Frideric Handel, by Philippe Mercier, c.1730

The Concerti grossi, Op. 3, HWV 312–317, are six concerti grossi by George Frideric Handel compiled into a set and published by John Walsh in 1734. Musicologists now agree that Handel had no initial knowledge of the publishing. Instead, Walsh, seeking to take advantage of the commercial success of Corelli's Concerti grossi, Op. 6, simply combined several of Handel's already existing works and grouped them into six "concertos".

== Concerti ==
No.	HWV	Key
1	312	B♭ major
2	313	B♭ major
3	314	G major
4	315	F major
5	316	D minor
6	317	D major

== Musical structure ==
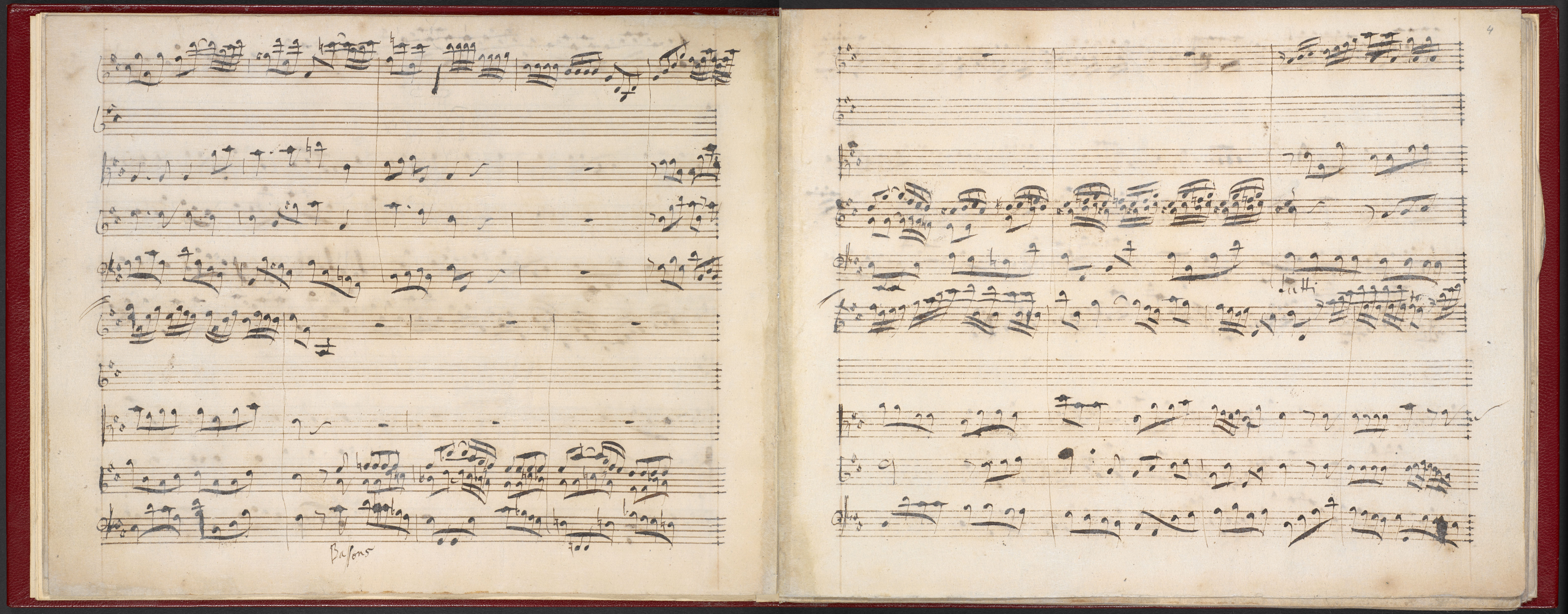
Autograph manuscript of pages 6–7 from the Vivace of HWV 317, British Library

The structure of Op. 3 is somewhat unusual. The six concertos have anything between two and five movements, but only one of them contains the usual four movements. Only occasionally are the instrumental forces set in the traditional concerto grosso manner: a tutti group and a contrasting, soloistic concertino group. However, the concertos are filled with virtuoso solo passages for both the strings and the woodwinds, thus maintaining the form of the concerto grosso despite the lack of traditional contrasting forces.

=== No. 1, HWV 312 ===
Concerto grosso in B♭ major, HWV 312
The London Baroque Orchestra, dir. Alexander Hamilton

The first and probably earliest concerto of the set is scored for two recorders, two oboes, two bassoons, strings (with divided viola), and continuo. It is unusual in that only its first movement is in the tonic key of B♭ major—the other two are in the relative minor, G minor.

1. Allegro
2. Largo
3. Allegro

=== No. 2, HWV 313 ===
Concerto grosso in B♭ major, HWV 313
The London Baroque Orchestra, dir. Alexander Hamilton

The second concerto contains four movements in B♭ major and one (the second) in G minor. The third movement of the concerto bears a close relationship to the overture to Handel's Brockes Passion of 1716. Unusually, two dance movements, a minuet, and a gavotte complete the concerto. The final gavotte consists of a statement and two variations. The concerto is scored for two oboes, one bassoon, strings, and continuo.

1. Vivace
2. Largo
3. Allegro
4. Moderato
5. Allegro

=== No. 3, HWV 314 ===
Concerto grosso in G major, HWV 314
The London Baroque Orchestra, dir. Alexander Hamilton

The third concerto in G major is again in three movements (the opening Largo is too brief to be counted as a movement). There is little doubt that this concerto was compiled by Walsh from a number of pieces by Handel. The concerto is scored for one oboe (can also be replaced by a transverse flute), one bassoon, strings, and continuo.

1. Largo, e staccato — Allegro
2. Andante
3. Allegro

=== No. 4, HWV 315 ===
Concerto grosso in F major, HWV 315
The London Baroque Orchestra, dir. Alexander Hamilton

The fourth concerto in F major is the only piece in the opus that follows a four movement framework. Although the layout of this work does not reflect the typical concerto grosso as the music was pulled straight from the 1716 overture to the 1715 opera Amadigi di Gaula, the piece uniquely displays many aspects of Handel's concerto grosso style. The piece is scored for two oboes, one bassoon, strings, and continuo.

1. Andante - Allegro
2. Andante
3. Allegro
4. Minuetto

Walsh also published a 'No. 4b' concerto erroneously under the name of Handel but it was withdrawn a few months later, possibly at Handel's request.

=== No. 5, HWV 316 ===
Concerto grosso in D minor, HWV 316
The London Baroque Orchestra, dir. Alexander Hamilton

Despite lack of division into tutti and concertino and the addition of an extra allegro movement at the very end, the fifth concerto in D minor follows the traditional Italian model most closely of all the Op. 3 works. Walsh at first only published the first two movements, but because the work had already been known in its entirety, it is probable that Handel requested it be published in full. The piece is scored for two oboes (originally one), one bassoon, strings, and continuo.

1. Largo
2. Fuga, allegro
3. Adagio
4. Allegro, ma non troppo
5. Allegro

=== No. 6, HWV 317 ===
Concerto grosso in D major, HWV 317
The London Baroque Orchestra, dir. Alexander Hamilton

The sixth and final concerto in D major has just two movements: a Vivace, the music of which is extracted from the 1723 opera Ottone; and an Allegro, which is also Handel's first published piece for organ and orchestra, and is taken from the overture to the 1712 opera Il pastor fido. The piece is scored for two oboes, one bassoon, strings, and continuo. The Allegro of the concerto was also announced 'commercially' by Walsh as part of the forthcoming edition of Handel's Op. 4: six concertos for chamber organ (or harpsichord).

1. Vivace
2. Allegro

== Selected discography ==
- Six Concerti Grossi, Op.3, The Boyd Neel Orchestra, dir. Boyd Neel, Decca Records, 1955.
- Concerti grossi, Op. 3, Concentus Musicus Wien, dir. Nikolaus Harnoncourt, Das Alte Werk, 1981.
- 6 Concerto Grossi, Op.3, The English Concert, dir. Trevor Pinnock, Archiv Produktion, 1984.
- Concerti grossi, Op. 3, Handel and Haydn Society, dir. Christopher Hogwood, L'Oiseau-Lyre, 1989.
- Concerti Grossi, Op. 3, 1–6, Tafelmusik, dir. Jeanne Lamon, Sony Classical, 1993.
- Concerti grossi, Op. 3, The Brandenburg Consort, dir. Roy Goodman, Hyperion Records, 2001.
- Concerti grossi, Op. 3, The Academy of Ancient Music, dir. Richard Egarr, Harmonia Mundi, 2007.
- Concerti grossi, Op. 3, Les Musiciens du Louvre, dir. Marc Minkowski, Erato Records, 2010.
- Concerti grossi, Op. 3, Berliner Barock Solisten, dir. Reinhard Goebel, Hänssler Classic, 2019.
- Concerti grossi, Op. 3, Accademia Bizantina, dir. Ottavio Dantone, HDB Sonus, 2022.

== See also ==
- Concerti grossi, Op. 6 (Handel)
