= Boyd Neel =

British conductor

Louis Boyd Neel O.C. (19 July 1905 – 30 September 1981) was an English, and later Canadian conductor and academic. He was Dean of the Royal Conservatory of Music at the University of Toronto. Neel founded and conducted chamber orchestras, and contributed to the revival of interest in baroque music and in the 19th and 20th Century string orchestra repertoire.

== Career ==
Neel was born in Blackheath, London, and wanted to be a pianist as a child. His mother, Ruby Le Couteur, was a professional accompanist, and his father was an engineer.

Neel attended the Royal Navy's colleges at Osborne and then Dartmouth, but left the navy before going to sea in order to study medicine at Caius College, Cambridge. He qualified in 1930, and became House Surgeon and Physician at Saint George's Hospital, London, and Resident Doctor at King Edward VII's Hospital, London.

In 1930, while practising medicine, Neel studied music theory and orchestration at the Guildhall School of Music.

=== The Boyd Neel Orchestra ===
For Neel, at this stage, music was still a hobby. He conducted amateur groups and formed an orchestra of young professionals, whom he recruited in 1932 from the Royal Academy of Music and the Royal College of Music. The Boyd Neel London String Orchestra (later the Boyd Neel Orchestra) made its debut at the Aeolian Hall, London, on 22 June 1933. The programme included the first performance in England of Respighi's Suite of Ancient Airs and Dances and the premiere of a new suite by occasional composer Julian Herbage. After the concert, Neel returned to his surgery and delivered a baby. The second concert, at the same venue, took place on 24 November 1933, and included the first performance in England of the Serenade for Strings by Wolf-Ferrari. On 18 December 1933 the orchestra was invited to broadcast by the BBC for the first time. When Decca offered Neel and the orchestra a contract, he left medicine to devote himself full-time to music.

On 16 February 1934 the orchestra performed a concert of chamber works by Ernest Bloch at the Aeolian Hall, conducted by the composer. Neel conducted the first music heard in the new Glyndebourne opera house in 1934, in private performances, at John Christie's invitation. Among the Boyd Neel Orchestra's early releases in 1936 were the first recordings of Vaughan Williams's Fantasia on a Theme by Thomas Tallis and Britten's Simple Symphony. The following year, Neel and his orchestra were invited to the Salzburg Festival, for which Neel commissioned Britten's Variations on a Theme of Frank Bridge. In 1939 Boyd Neel commissioned John Ireland's three movement Concertino Pastorale for string orchestra, first played at the Canterbury Festival on 14 June 1939. It was subsequently recorded in February 1940. The orchestra toured Great Britain and Europe until the outbreak of war.

=== World War II to 1952 ===
During World War II, Neel returned to medical work and the Navy, while continuing to conduct when time permitted. Britten wrote his Prelude and Fugue for 18 string instruments as a 10th birthday present to the Boyd Neel Orchestra in 1943. The same year Gordon Jacob wrote his austere Symphony for Strings for them to perform. It shares much the same emotional terrain as Honegger's Symphony No.2 for trumpet and strings, which the orchestra was also playing at the time. Mátyás Seiber's Besardo Suite No.2, composed in 1942, was premiered by the Boyd Neel Orchestra at the Wigmore Hall on 3 December 1945.

After the war, Neel resumed his musical career, conducting for Sadler's Wells Opera ('50 Rigolettos' he recalled) from 1944 to 1946 and the D'Oyly Carte Opera Company for its 1947 and 1948 London seasons at Sadler's Wells, performing the Gilbert and Sullivan operas.

Beginning in 1947, with the Boyd Neel Orchestra, he embarked on a series of world tours, playing in Australia, New Zealand, Canada and the United States, and appearing in festivals such as Edinburgh and Aix-en-Provence. Neel published a book about these experiences called The Story of an Orchestra in 1950. As well as modern works, the orchestra revived then seldom heard Baroque works by J S Bach, J C Bach, Handel, Vivaldi, Torelli and Geminiani, including the first ever recording of Handel's Concerti Grossi, Op. 6.

=== Toronto and later years ===
In 1952 Neel accepted the post of Dean of the Royal Conservatory of Music at Toronto, Ontario. He served in this post for 18 years, reorganising and rebuilding the Faculty of Music at the University of Toronto. Soon after his appointment he formed the Hart House Orchestra in Toronto and toured with it extensively, at, among other events, the Brussels World's Fair in 1958, the Aldeburgh Festival in 1966 and Expo '67. After this, he became Artistic Director of the Sarnia Festival Opera House on Lake Huron.

After Neel's departure to Canada, the Boyd Neel Orchestra was renamed the Philomusica of London. Neel was awarded the C.B.E. in 1953 and was an honorary member of the Royal Academy of Music. He became a naturalized Canadian citizen in 1961.

During the years of 1956, 1962, 1965, 1967–1972, and 1973–1974, he conducted in the Naumburg Orchestral Concerts, in the Naumburg Bandshell, Central Park, in the summer series.

In 1972, Neel was appointed an officer of the Order of Canada, "For his contribution to music education in Canada and his achievements as an artist and conductor."

After his retirement, Neel worked on his memoirs, which were edited and published posthumously by his friend, J. David Finch. The book also includes an extensive discography of recordings of the Boyd Neel Orchestra and the National Symphony Orchestra conducted by Neel for Decca Records between 1934 and 1979. Neel died in Toronto at the age of 76.

== Publications ==
=== Books ===
- Neel, Boyd. The Story of an Orchestra, Vox Mundi, London, 1950. with an introduction by Benjamin Britten.
- Mitchell, Donald and Keller, Hans, (ed.) Benjamin Britten: a Commentary, Rockcliff, 1952. (Neel contributed the chapter on string music)
- Neel, Boyd, and J David Finch. My orchestras and other adventures: the memoirs of Boyd Neel University of Toronto Press, Toronto, 1985. ISBN 0-8020-5674-1

=== Sound recordings ===
- Boyd Neel Orchestra; George Frideric Handel; Boyd Neel (1973). The water music [sound recording]. Ace of Diamonds, SDD 2191 (EAL.2296-2297).
