= Twelve concerti grossi, Op. 6 (Corelli) =

Compositions by Arcangelo Corelli

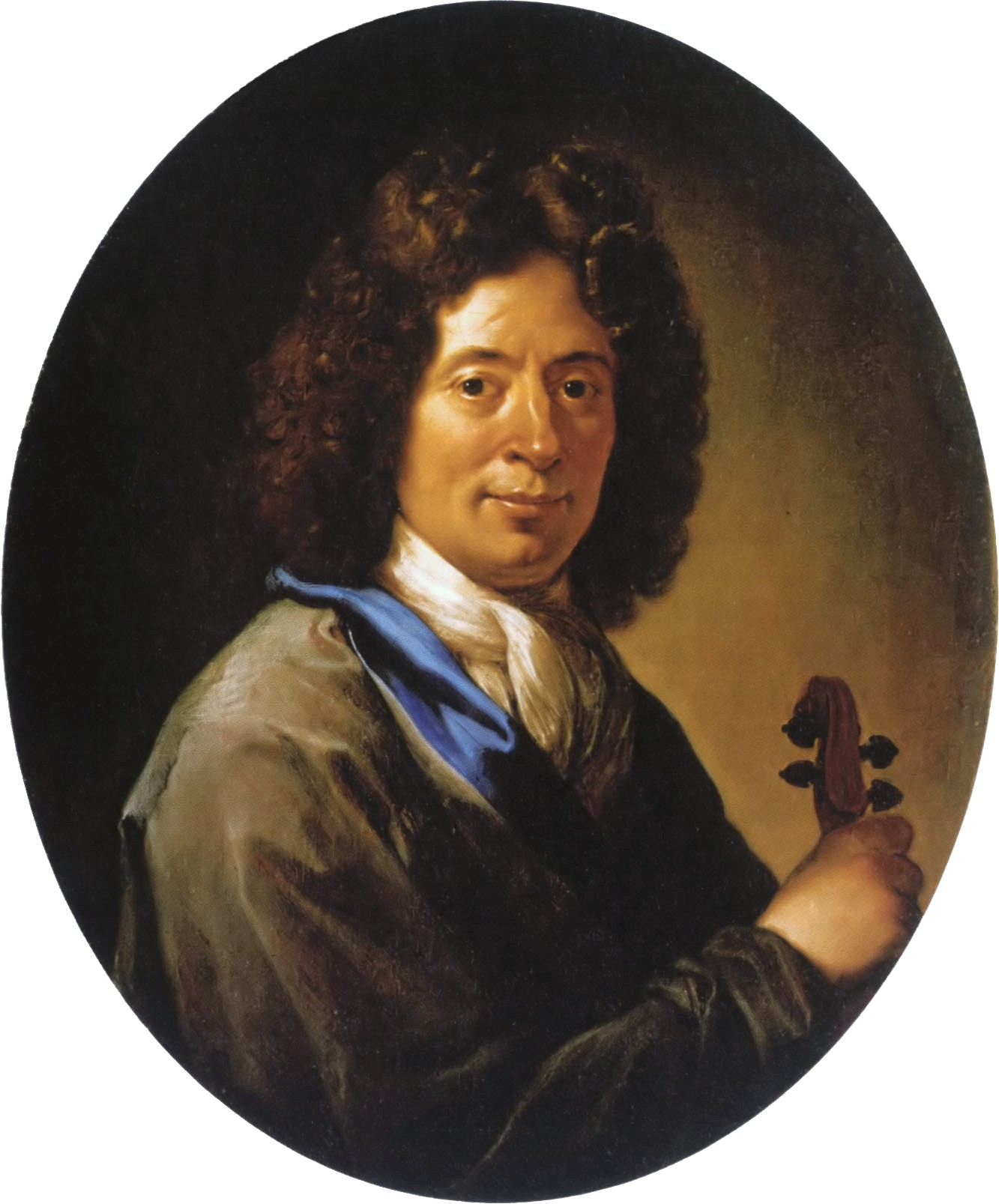
Arcangelo Corelli

Twelve concerti grossi, Op. 6, is a collection of twelve concerti written by Arcangelo Corelli probably in the 1680s but not prepared for publication until 1714. They are among the finest and first examples of concerti grossi: concertos for a concertino group (here a 1st violin, a 2nd violin and a cello) and a ripieno group of strings with continuo. Their publication – decades after their composition and after Italian composers had moved to favor the ritornello concerto form associated with Antonio Vivaldi – caused waves of concerto grosso writing in Germany and England, where in 1739 George Frideric Handel honored Corelli directly with his own "Opus 6" collection of twelve.

== Details ==
The first eight are concerti da chiesa while the last four are concerti da camera.

=== No. 1 in D major ===
1. Largo
2. Allegro
3. Largo – Allegro
4. Largo – Allegro
5. Allegro

c. 12 minutes

=== No. 2 in F major ===
1. Vivace – Allegro – Adagio
2. Allegro
3. Grave – Largo
4. Allegro

c. 10 minutes

=== No. 3 in C minor ===
1. Largo
2. Allegro – Adagio
3. Grave
4. Vivace
5. Allegro

c. 10 minutes

=== No. 4, in D major ===
Concerto Grosso Op. 6, No. 4
I. Adagio – Allegro
Performed by the Advent Chamber Orchestra

1. Adagio – Allegro
2. Adagio
3. Vivace
4. Allegro – Giga: Presto

c. 10 minutes

=== No. 5, in B♭ major ===
1. Adagio – Allegro – Adagio
2. Adagio
3. Allegro – Adagio
4. Largo
5. Allegro

c. 11 minutes

=== No. 6, in F major ===
1. Adagio
2. Allegro
3. Largo
4. Vivace
5. Allegro

c. 12 minutes

=== No. 7, in D major ===
1. Vivace – Allegro – Adagio
2. Allegro
3. Andante largo
4. Allegro
5. Vivace

c. 9 minutes

=== No. 8, in G minor ===
Concerto Grosso Op. 6, No. 8
Movements 1 and 2

Movements 4 to 6
Performed by the Advent Chamber Orchestra

Also known as the Christmas Concerto as it was written for Christmas Eve and has a pastorale in the last movement.

1. Vivace – Grave
2. Allegro
3. Adagio – Allegro – Adagio
4. Vivace
5. Allegro
6. Largo - Pastorale ad libitum

c. 14 minutes

=== No. 9, in F major ===
1. Preludio: Largo
2. Allemanda: Allegro
3. Corrente: Vivace
4. Gavotta: Allegro
5. Adagio
6. Minuetto: Vivace

c. 9 minutes

=== No. 10, in C major ===
1. Preludio: Largo
2. Allemanda: Allegro
3. Adagio
4. Corrente: Vivace
5. Allegro
6. Minuetto: Vivace

c. 13 minutes

=== No. 11, in B♭ major ===
1. Preludio: Largo
2. Allemanda: Allegro
3. Adagio
4. Largo
5. Sarabanda: Largo
6. Giga: Vivace

c. 10 minutes

=== No. 12, in F major ===
1. Preludio: Adagio
2. Allegro
3. Adagio
4. Sarabanda: Vivace
5. Giga: Allegro

c. 10 minutes

Length estimates are drawn from the recording by The English Concert.

== Discography ==
- Pavlo Beznosiuk (conductor and violin), The Avison Ensemble, 2 discs, Linn Records (2012)
- The English Concert (on authentic instruments) directed from the harpsichord by Trevor Pinnock, with Simon Standage, Micaela Comberti (concertino violins) & Jaap ter Linden (concertino violoncello). 2 discs, Archiv Produktion, 1988.
- I Musici, rev. Vittorio Negri, with Felix Ayo, Arnaldo Apostoli, Guy Bovet, Maria Teresa Garatti, Marijke Smit Sibinga, 2 discs, Philips Classics, (1966)

== See also ==
- Publications by Friedrich Chrysander
