= Giovanni Lorenzo Gregori =

Italian violinist and composer

Giovanni Lorenzo Gregori (1663 – January 1745 in Lucca) was an Italian violinist, composer, and music theorist.

== Life and career ==
Giovanni Lorenzo Gregori was born in Lucca, Republic of Lucca in 1663. On 13 April 1688, at the age of 25, he was appointed violinist to the Cappella di Palazzo in his native city; a position he served in for more than 50 years. His tenure at the Cappella di Palazzo ended in January 1742, when bad health forced him to retire. His son, Angelo Paolino Gregori, succeeded him in his violin post.

Gregori's brother, Bartolomeo Gregori, was a music publisher in Lucca, and Giovanni assisted his brother in this enterprise. He was also a music educator and theorist of note; publishing the music theory texts Il canto fermo in pratica (1697) and Il principianti di musica (1735). He was the first to use the term Concerto grosso in a set of 10 compositions published in Lucca in 1698.

== Works ==
- (34) Arie in stile francese a 1 e 2 voci, Op. 1 (Lucca, 1695)
- (10) Concerti grossi per due violini concertati con i ripieni se piace, alto viola, arcileuto o violoncello, con il basso per l’organo, Op. 2 (Lucca, 1698)
- Cantate da Camera a voce sola, Op. 3 (Lucca, 1698)
- Oratorio per Santa Cecilia (Lucca, 1701, lost)
- I trionfi della fede nel martirio del gloriosissimo S. Paolino primo vescovo di Lucca (Lucca, 1703, lost)
- Concerti sacri a 1 o 2 voci con strumenti (Lucca, 1705)
- La Passione di Nostro Signore Gesù Cristo (Lucca, 1735)
- La Natività di Nostro Signor Gesù Cristo (Lucca, 1735 or 1737, lost)
- Le glorie di S. Anna (Lucca, 1739, lost)
