= Sonata da chiesa =

17th-century genre of musical composition

Sonata da chiesa (Italian: "church sonata") is a 17th-century genre of musical composition for one or more melody instruments and is regarded as an antecedent of later forms of 18th-century instrumental music. It generally comprises four movements, typically a largo prelude followed by a fugal allegro, an expressive slow movement, and an allegro finale, although there are also many variations of this pattern.

During the 17th century, church services were increasingly accompanied by music for ensembles rather than solo organ, with canzonas and sonatas regularly substituted for the Proper during Mass and Vespers. Many of these works, however, were not written explicitly as liturgical music and were often performed as concert pieces for entertainment. The term sonata da chiesa was originally used in its literal meaning of "church music", but later came to be used figuratively to contrast this genre of composition with the sonata da camera, which literally meant "chamber music", but generally comprised a suite of dances.

The exemplary works in this form are by Arcangelo Corelli, whose Op. 1 (1681) and Op. 3 (1689) each consist of 12 trio sonatas with alternating slow-fast-slow-fast movements (the first 8 of the Twelve concerti grossi, Op. 6, follow this pattern as well). This four movement scheme is followed in J. S. Bach's three sonatas for unaccompanied violin, in the first five of his six sonatas for violin and obbligato harpsichord and in the first two of his three sonatas for viola da gamba and obbligato harpsichord.

By the mid-18th century, however, this style of music was increasingly out of date, although Joseph Haydn, for example, did compose a few early symphonies that followed the largo–allegro–minuet–allegro pattern.

Wolfgang Amadeus Mozart also composed 17 works that are called "church sonatas", but these consisted of but a single movement for organ and strings to be played between the Epistle and the Gospel of the Mass.
