= Ripieno =

Musical performance grouping

The ripieno (Italian pronunciation: [riˈpjɛːno], Italian for "stuffing" or "padding") is the bulk of instrumental parts of a musical ensemble who do not play as soloists, especially in Baroque music. These are the players who would play in sections marked tutti, as opposed to soloist sections. An individual member of the ripieno is called a ripienista.

In the concerto grosso, it refers to the larger of the two ensembles as opposed to the group of soloists called the concertino. In a ripieno concerto, there are no solo parts. The term can also refer to the main body of an orchestra in early orchestral music, although this use is today often disregarded.

In band music, the term (or its variant spellings repiano and ripiano) is used similarly to designate the players not at the leading desk, especially the clarinet and cornet players in military bands.

The expression senza ripieni is an instruction to play without the ripienistas; this instruction is frequently found in works by Handel.

The term can also be used to designate a pipe organ mixture stop.
