= Academy of Ancient Music =

British period-instrument orchestra

- Orchestra
- Short name: AAM
- Former name: Academy of Vocal Music
- Founded: 1726 (revived 1973)
- Location: Cambridge
- Concert hall: Barbican Centre
- Music director: Laurence Cummings
- Website: www.aam.co.uk

The Academy of Ancient Music (AAM) is a British period-instrument orchestra based in Cambridge, England. Founded by harpsichordist Christopher Hogwood in 1973, it was named after an 18th-century organisation of the same name (originally the Academy of Vocal Music). The musicians play on either original instruments from the period when the music was composed or modern copies of such instruments. They generally play Baroque, Classical, and sometimes Romantic music, although they have also played some new compositions for baroque orchestra in recent years.

== Original organisation ==
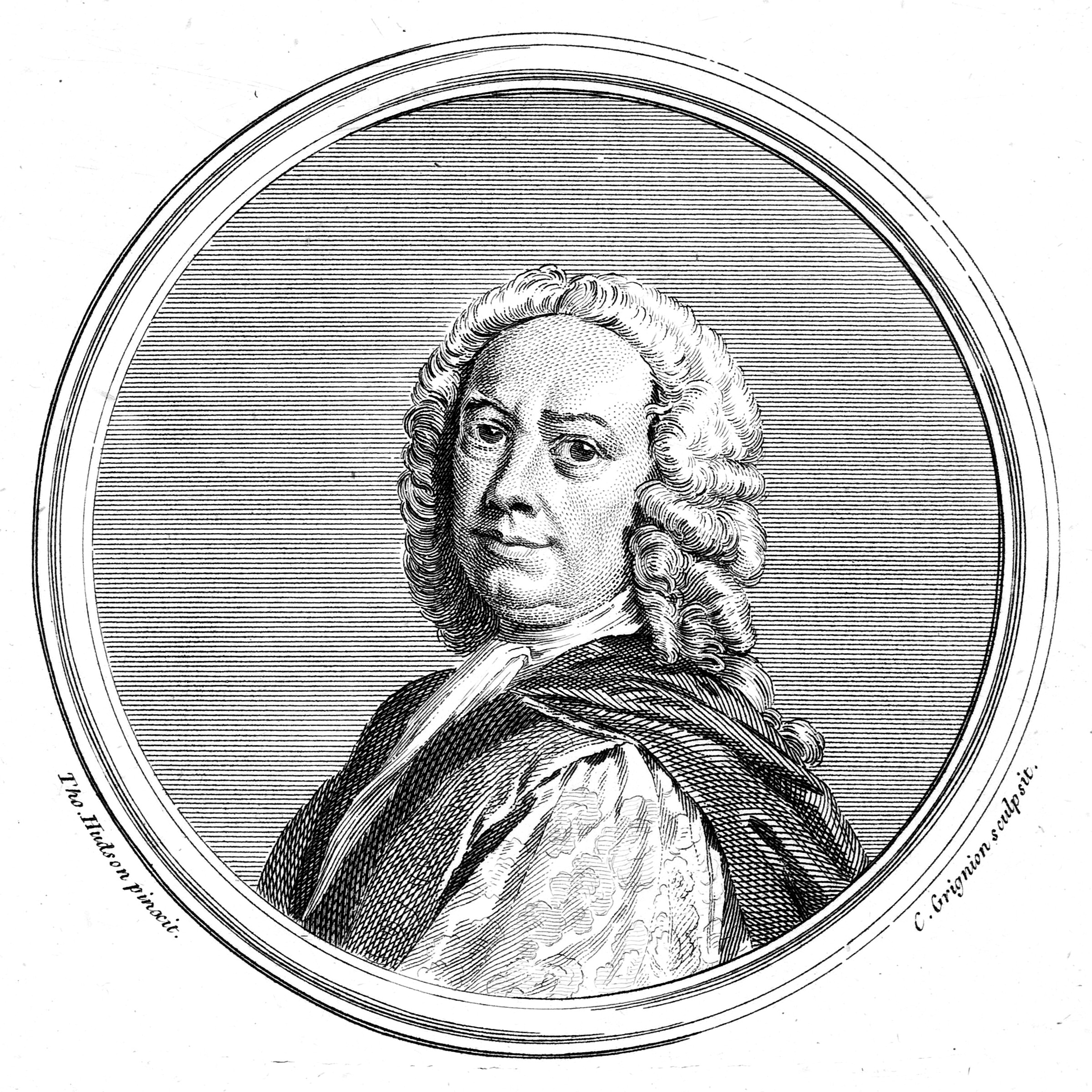
Maurice Greene, one of the original members of the 18th-century society

The original Academy of Vocal Music was founded in London, England in 1725/26 (the Gregorian date of the inaugural meeting was 1 February 1726). Records of the purpose of the academy no longer exist, but according to John Hawkins in 1770, it was intended to "promote the study and practice of vocal and instrumental harmony". From the beginning, Agostino Steffani was elected honorary president for life.

In 1731 it was renamed the Academy of Ancient Music, and continued to grow in membership, including the composers William Croft, Michael Christian Festing, Maurice Greene, Bernard Gates, Giovanni Bononcini, Senesino, Nicola Haym, Francesco Geminiani, Pier Francesco Tosi, John Ernest Galliard, Charles Dieupart, Jean-Baptiste Loeillet and Giuseppe Riva. George Frideric Handel was never a member, although the society studied and performed his music as well as their own, and that of other composers of the day. Directors of the organisation included Johann Christoph Pepusch (from 1735 onwards), Benjamin Cooke and Samuel Arnold (from 1789 onwards).

H. D. Johnstone called the Academy of Ancient Music "the most famous and influential institution of its kind in eighteenth-century London".

== Modern revival ==
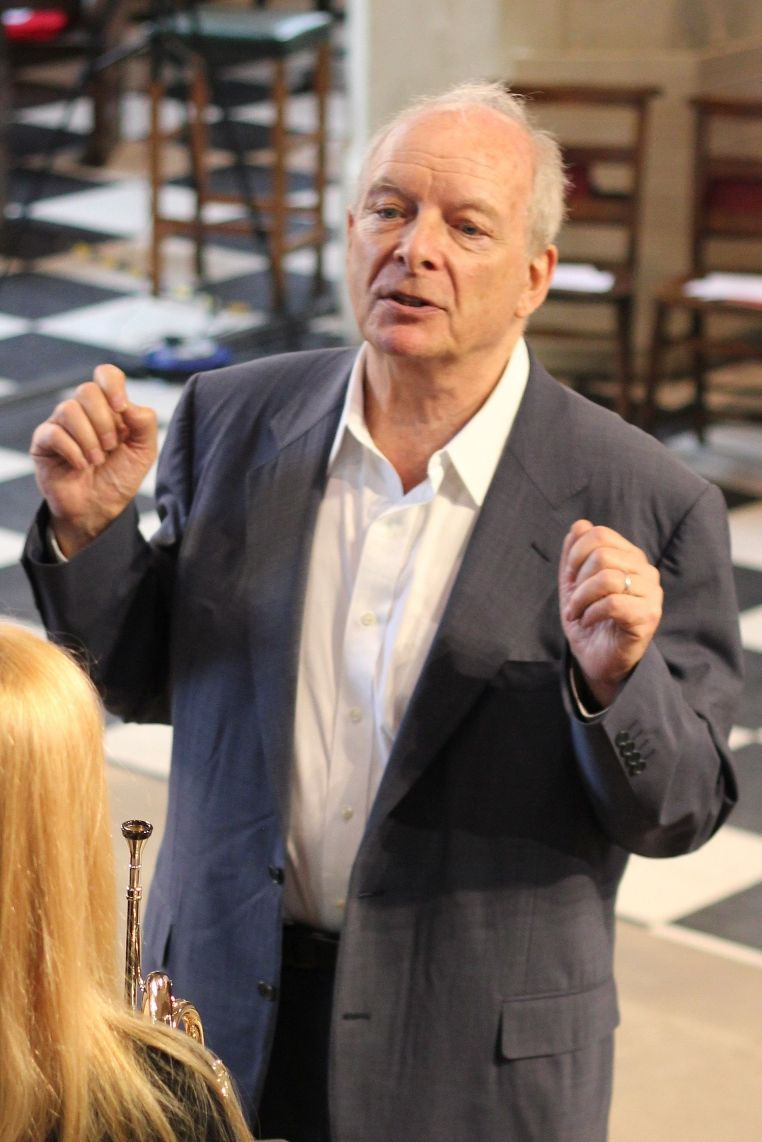
Christopher Hogwood, who revived AAM in 1973

In 1973, the Academy of Ancient Music was revived by the British conductor and harpsichordist, Christopher Hogwood, for the purpose of playing 18th- and early 19th-century music on period instruments. For choral works, it is joined by the Academy of Ancient Music Chorus or by other external choruses.

The AAM was the first orchestra to record all of Mozart's symphonies on period instruments. The AAM has since recorded the complete Mozart's piano concertos, with fortepianist Robert Levin, the complete Beethoven's piano concertos, with fortepianist Steven Lubin, and symphonies, and has recorded numerous Haydn's symphonies. The AAM has also recorded Purcell's Dido and Aeneas, Handel's Orlando and Rinaldo, Mozart's La clemenza di Tito, Haydn's L'anima del filosofo and over 200 other recordings for a range of different labels.

The commissioning of new works under Paul Goodwin represented a new development for the AAM. The first commission and recording, John Tavener's Eternity's Sunrise, met with enthusiastic critical acclaim and led to a second new Tavener work and recording, Total Eclipse/Agraphon. David Bedford's Like a Strand of Scarlet followed in 2001 and, in 2003, the AAM premiered John Woolrich's Arcangelo, written to mark the 350th anniversary of the birth of Arcangelo Corelli. The next commission in 2006 celebrated the 250th anniversary of Mozart's birth with a work from the Scottish-American composer Thea Musgrave, Journey into Light, which was written as a companion piece to Mozart's Exsultate, jubilate. Recently, this trend has been revived with commissioning the harpsichordist, conductor, and scholar Mahan Esfahani to write a new orchestration of Bach's The Art of Fugue, which was premiered at the BBC Proms in July 2012.

Both Tavener recordings are on Harmonia Mundi (France), for whom the AAM has made a large number of CDs: Mozart's Zaïde and Christmas music by Schütz and his contemporaries (conducted by Paul Goodwin); violin concertos by J.S. Bach and Vivaldi and concerti grossi by Handel and Geminiani (directed by Andrew Manze). Choral recordings include works by Bach, Handel, Purcell and Vivaldi, with King's College Choir under Stephen Cleobury, and several recordings with New College Choir under Edward Higginbottom, including Pergolesi's Marian Vespers and Handel's coronation anthems, a collection of music from 17th and 18th-century English coronations. With Richard Egarr, the orchestra has released Handel's instrumental music Opp. 1–7, as well as Bach's six Brandenburg Concertos, four orchestral suites, seven single harpsichord concertos and his St Matthew and St John Passions.

In 2013, the orchestra announced the opening of its own record label, the AAM Records, whose first album was released in October of the same year.

The AAM is Orchestra-in-Residence at the University of Cambridge. In January 2020, the Teatro San Cassiano announced that the AAM is to become its first associate ensemble.

== Leadership ==
In 1996, the AAM appointed Paul Goodwin as associate conductor and Andrew Manze as associate director under Hogwood. In 2003, Manze resigned as associate director, to be replaced in 2005 by Richard Egarr. On 1 September 2006, Egarr succeeded Hogwood as music director of the AAM and Hogwood received the title of emeritus director. Egarr concluded his tenure as AAM music director at the close of the 2020–2021 season. In November 2020, the AAM announced the appointment of Laurence Cummings as its next music director, effective with the 2021–2022 season.

Past general managers and chief executives of the AAM have included Heather Jarman, Paul Hughes, Christopher Lawrence, Peter Ansell, Michael Garvey, Jonathan Manners, Ed Hossack and Alexander Van Ingen. In June 2020, the AAM announced the appointment of John McMunn as its next chief executive, effective 1 September 2020.

== Music directors ==
- Christopher Hogwood (1973–2006)
- Richard Egarr (2006–2021)
- Laurence Cummings (2021–present)
