= James Nares (composer) =

English composer

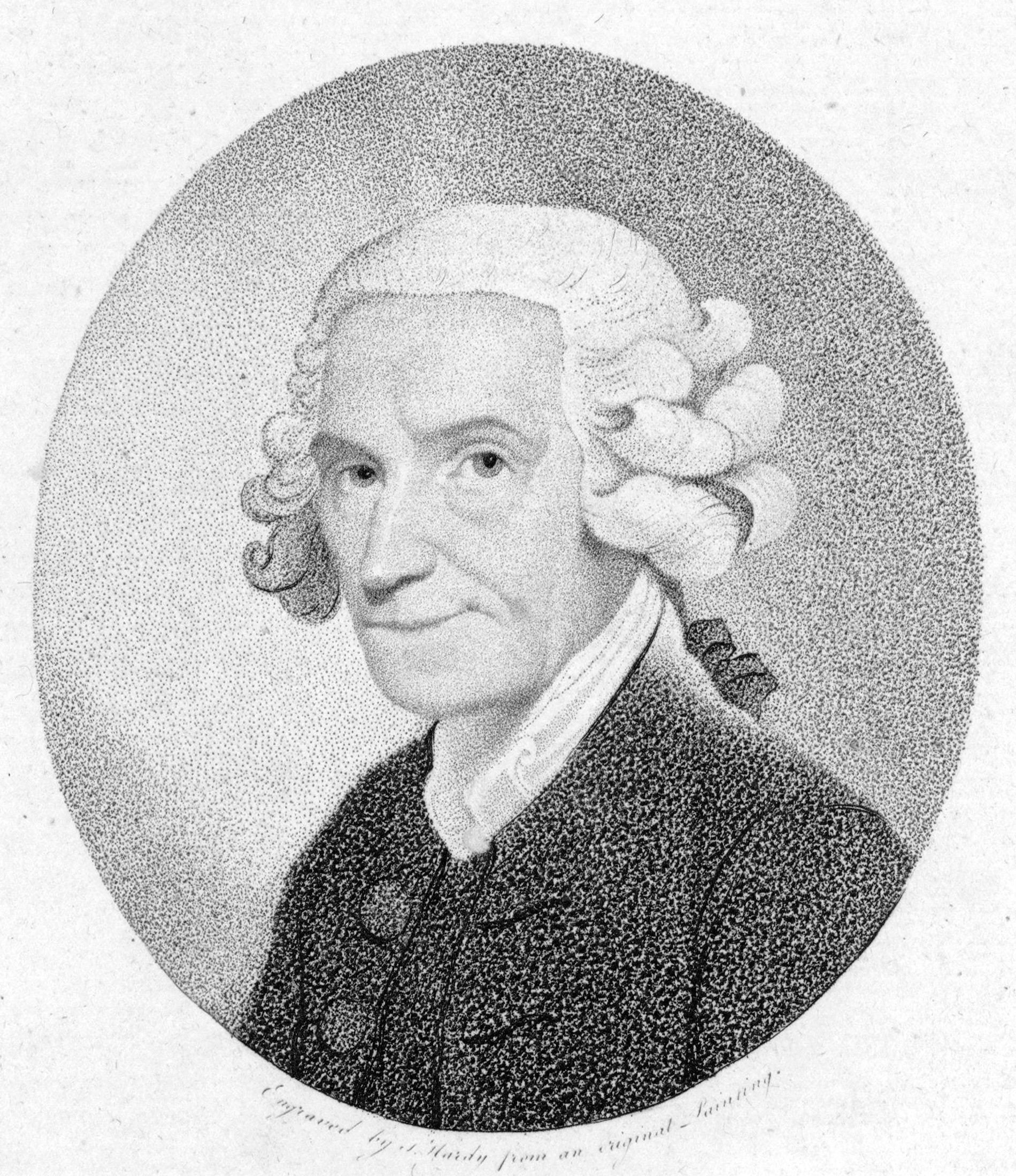
- James Nares by Thomas Hardy

Background information
- Born: 19 April 1715; Stanwell
- Origin: Norwich
- Died: 10 February 1783 (aged 67)
- Genres: Classical
- Occupations: Composer, musician
- Instruments: Organ, harpsichord

James Nares (19 April 1715 – 10 February 1783) was an English composer of mostly sacred vocal works, though he also composed for the harpsichord and organ.

== Life ==
Nares was born in Stanwell, although soon after his family moved to Oxfordshire. His brother was a justice, Sir George Nares.

He began his career as Deputy Organist of St. George's Chapel in Windsor Castle, and was later appointed Organist of York Minster in 1735. He married soon after that. Nares was a pupil of Bernard Gates (Master of the King's Choristers), Johann Christoph Pepusch and William Croft. His patron and friend was John Fountayne, the Dean of York.

He replaced his tutor, Gates, as chorister at the Chapel Royal in 1756. At this time the University of Cambridge bestowed the degree Doctor of Music upon him.

He was assistant organist at St George's Chapel in Windsor, then succeeded Salisbury at York Minster, before returning to the Chapel Royal in 1756 to become organist and composer to George III, succeeding Maurice Greene.

Nares resigned his duties in July 1781 due to declining health and died 10 February 1783.

Nares is buried in St. Margaret's, Westminster. His service in F and many of his anthems are still used in cathedrals.

He was the father of Revd Robert Nares (1753–1829), the philologist and author.

== Compositions ==
- The Souls of the Righteous, 1734
- Set of eight Harpsichord Lessons, 1747
- Five Harpsichord lessons, Op. 2, 1759
- Elegy on Mr. Handel, 1759
- Il Principio or a Regular Introduction to playing on the Harpsichord or Organ, 1760, reissued in facsimile by Oxford University Press in 1981.
- Six Fugues for Organ, 1772
- Three Easy Harpsichord Lessons, 1778
- A Treatise on Singing, 1778
- The Royal Pastoral, 1778
- Collection of Catches, Canons and Glees, 1778
- Six Organ Fugues, 1778
- Second Treatise on Singing, with a set of English duets, 1778
- Twenty Anthems, 1778 (Note: Part of 53 anthems, 20 were published in 1778 by the composer, 6 were published in 1788 by an editor Dr. Ayrton, and gotten a new edition and publication by John Larkin Hopkins in 1847. The rest (27) were published by separately in different time periods, the latest ("Wherewithall a young man") being published in 1834.)
- A Morning and Evening Service and Six Anthems, 1788

== Sources ==
- James Nares. Il Principio or a Regular Introduction to playing on the Harpsichord or Organ, a Facsimile of the Original Edition of 1760 with Introduction Notes by Robin Langley, London, Oxford University Press, 1981.

== Notes ==
Cultural offices
Preceded by Maurice Green	First Organist of the Chapel Royal; 1756–1783	Succeeded by Samuel Arnold
Preceded by Bernard Gates	Master of the Children of the Chapel Royal; 1757–1780	Succeeded by Edmund Ayrton
