= Sarah Walmsley =

18th century actress and long-term partner of actor John Edwin

- Died: 8 January 1794; London
- Other names: Mrs. Edwin (stage name)
- Occupations: Actress; milliner
- Years active: 1777–1793
- Organization(s): Theatre Royal Haymarket; Theatre Royal, Drury Lane
- Partner: John Edwin
- Children: 5, including John Edwin

Sarah Walmsley (d. 8 January 1794) was an English stage actress and milliner, and long-time partner of actor John Edwin.

== Biography ==
=== Hatmaking and meeting John Edwin ===
Walmsley had acquired a reputation for being a "respectable milliner" based in Horse Street, Bath by 1768. At this time, she held shares in her millinery amounting to £1,000 (equivalent to £158,857 in 2024).

Walmsley met Edwin at some point in 1768, shortly after he joined the Bath acting company. Walmsley's financial position exceeded him, as Edwin's acting career was not particularly successful, nor was he financially stable. Edwin convinced Walmsley to sell her shares, amounting to £1,000 (equivalent to £158,857 in 2024); he used the money to finance his career, but also to satisfy his personal whims.

Though Walmsley went by the name Sarah Edwin, and later performed under the name Mrs. Edwin when she began acting, they were never formally married. Their relationship lasted for around twenty years, and they would have five children:

- John Edwin the Younger (c. 1769 – 1805), who became a successful stage actor in his own right and married Elizabeth Rebecca Edwin, an actress popular in Ireland and Britain
- Richard (c. 1774)
- David (1776–1841), who briefly followed his parents into acting
- Sarah (d. 1793), briefly an actress; died young
- An unnamed son

=== Acting career ===
Before meeting Edwin, Walmsley had no acting experience. With his encouragement, she began participating in occasional performances with the Bath company by 1777. Writing to friend George Colman in March of that year, Edwin described Walmsley as modest about her ability, though he felt she was a "very good study" and "might upon an emergency supply the place of a better actress."

Soon afterwards, Walmsley relocated to London with Edwin; the family maintained a residence on Bedford Street. Edwin earned a permanent contract to perform at Covent Garden in 1779, establishing him in the city's theatre circles. The first record of Walmsley participating in a London play was a July 1781 production of The Baron Kinkvervankotsdorsprakingatchdern, a comedic opera.

Walmsley performed intermittently, though the annual frequency of her appearances increased throughout the 1780s. According to one biography, theatre producers may have offered Walmsley more roles to ensure she was in a better position to provide for her children, as Edwin's behaviour was growing increasingly erratic.

=== Separation from Edwin ===
Edwin was not faithful to Walmsley throughout their relationship. In 1789, he rekindled a particularly intense affair with a former partner, to the upset of Walmsley and the disgust of their eldest son, John the Younger. Edwin retaliated by evicting Walmsley and their children from their home; he also demanded that Walmsley cease acting at any theatre where Edwin himself performed.

Edwin's actions resulted in a media circus focused on his apparent neglect of his first family. His son, John the Younger, published an article claiming that he was his mother's primary source of financial support, and had been for some time. This article elicited a lengthy response from Edwin the Elder. London's theatre-goers perceived the elder Edwin's actions poorly, partly because it was understood that Walmsley had effectively financed his career, and partly because Walmsley herself was "highly respected." Though Walmsley acquiesced to her partner's demands, the public effectively "drove Edwin... from the stage," as audiences occasionally "hissed" when he appeared.

In June 1790, Edwin married a woman named Mary Hubbard. Edwin died in October 1790, after what the Ipswich Journal described as a period of "gradual decay." Walmsley and her daughter did not attend the funeral, though her sons did.

=== Later career ===
Walmsley continued to act intermittently under the name 'Mrs. Edwin,' starring in tertiary comedic and singing roles. She died 8 January 1794, shortly after the death of her daughter, who had died suddenly in September 1793.

== Notable roles ==
As 'Mrs. Edwin' at the Haymarket and Drury Lane theatres:

- Mistress Quickly in The Merry Wives of Windsor by William Shakespeare
- Garnet in The Good-Natur'd Man by Oliver Goldsmith
- Lady Pedigree in The Young Quaker by John O'Keeffe
- Ursula in The Widow's Vow by Elizabeth Inchbald
- Mrs. Cheshire in The Agreeable Surprise by Samuel Arnold
- Dorcas in Richard Coeur de Lion by John Burgoyne
- Mrs. Cloggit in The Confederacy by John Vanbrugh
