= Thomas Sanders Dupuis =

English composer and organist

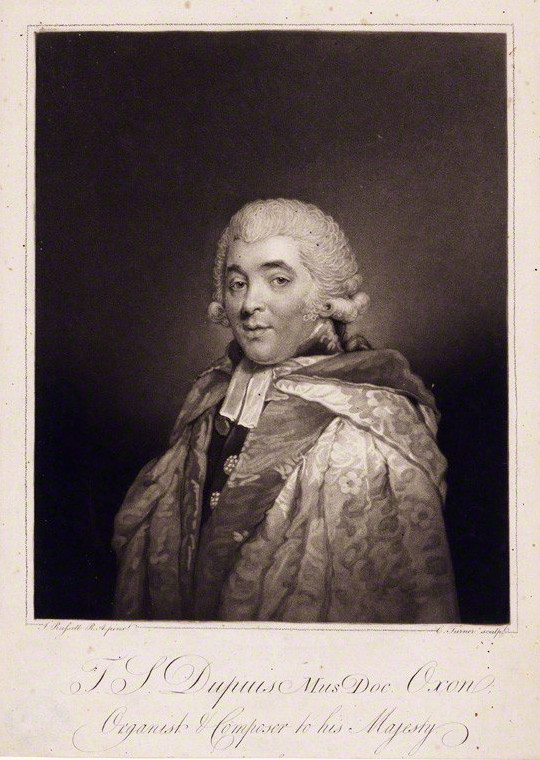
Thomas Sanders Dupuis

Thomas Sanders Dupuis, Mus. Doc. (5 November, 1733–17 July, 1796) was a composer and organist of French extraction, born in London. He succeeded William Boyce at the Chapel Royal, and was regarded as one of the best organists of his day. In his diaries, Haydn referred to Dupuis as ‘a great organist’ after hearing his improvised fugues at St James’s Church in 1792.

== Life ==
He was the third son of John Dupuis, a member of a Huguenot family who is said to have held an appointment at court, and his wife Susannah. Dupuis was brought up as a chorister in the Chapel Royal under Bernard Gates and John Travers. While there he established lifelong connections with two younger choristers, Philip Hayes and Samuel Arnold. On 3 December 1758 he was elected a member of the Royal Society of Musicians.

In 1760 Dupuis was a contributor to the London operatic production of Antigona at the King’s Theatre, Haymarket, staged under the musical direction of Felice Giardini. By 1773 he was organist of the Charlotte Street Chapel (later St. Peter's Chapel, now demolished) near Buckingham Palace, and on the death of William Boyce he was elected (24 March 1779) organist and composer to the Chapel Royal. On 26 June 1790 Dupuis accumulated the degrees of Mus.Bac. and Mus.Doc. at Oxford. In the same year he originated a sort of musical club, known as the Graduates' Meeting.

As a prominent organist, he was often called upon to design or 'open' newly installed instruments, and is said to have supervised the rebuilding of the Chapel Royal organ. He was one of the directors of the Handel Commemoration in 1784.

Dupuis died from an overdose of opium at King's Row, Park Lane, 17 July 1796, and was buried in the west cloister of Westminster Abbey on the 24th. There is a white marble tablet with an urn in his memory. Charles Burney (in Rees's Cyclopædia) described him as "a correct harmonist in his compositions and a good performer on the organ, with a fancy not very rich or original; but his finger was lively and he knew his instrument well". In the obituary notice in the Gentleman’s Magazine he was praised as "distinguished for good sense, knowledge of mankind, integrity and benevolence".

== Music ==
Subscriptions were invited for his op. 1 Concertos on 11 October 1760. The op. 2 Sonatas of 1768 (for keyboard accompanied by violin), like many of his keyboard works, were didactic pieces for his students: others include the Eight Easy Keyboard Lessons, op. 4, six more Sonatas with violin (op. 7, 1788), and two sets of pieces "for the use of Young Organists", op. 8. His degree piece of 1790 was titled Ode to the Genius of Britain for soloists, chorus and orchestra. His published work includes Nine Voluntaries for the Organ, performed before their Majesties at the Chapel Royal, St. Paul's Cathedral, etc. A collection of secular songs, Eight Songs and Six Glees was published in 1784. The Ode on the Late Providential Escape of His Majesty (1786) for solo voices and continuo, used a text by his son Thomas. Three volumes of his cathedral music were published after his death in 1797 by his pupil John Spencer, including four services and 14 anthems, with an engraved portrait.

== Family ==
Dupuis married Martha Skelton of Fulham on 16 July 1765. They had three sons, Thomas Skelton (1766–1795, librettist), George (died an infant), and Charles (1770–1824). His wife predeceased him.
