= John Wilson Croker =

19th-century Anglo-Irish politician and statesman

The Right Honourable John Wilson Croker
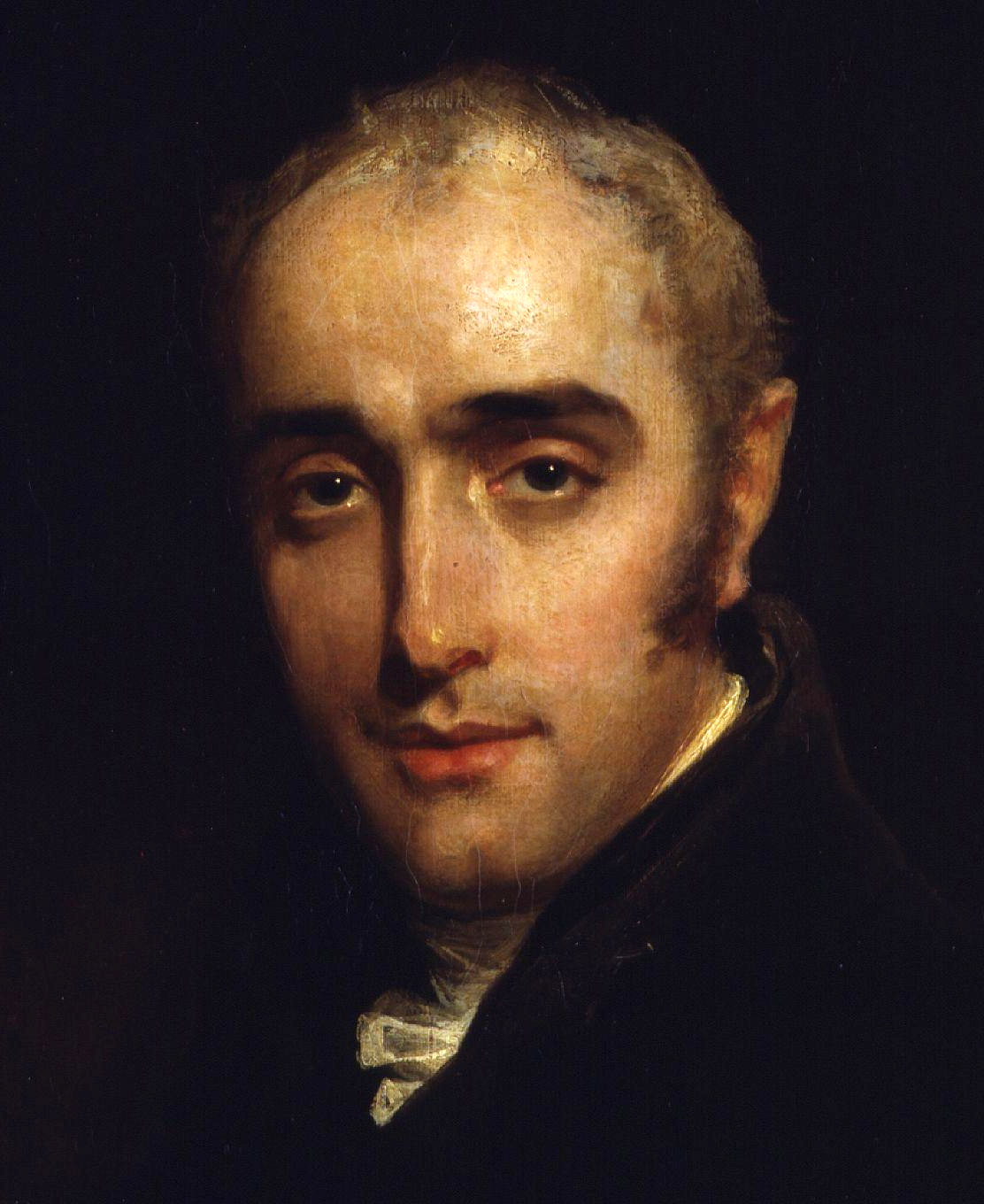
- John Wilson Croker, by William Owen

First Secretary to the Admiralty
- In office 12 October 1809 – 2 May 1827
- Prime Minister: Spencer Perceval; The Earl of Liverpool
- Preceded by: William Wellesley Pole
- Succeeded by: George Elliot

Member of Parliament
- In office 22 June 1807 – 3 December 1832
- Constituency: Aldeburgh (1830–1832); Dublin University (1827–1830); Aldeburgh (1826–1827); Bodmin (1820–1826); Yarmouth (1819–1820); Athlone (1812–1818); Downpatrick (1807–1812)

Personal details
- Born: 20 December 1780 Galway, Ireland
- Died: 10 August 1857 (aged 76)
- Party: Tory
- Education: Trinity College Dublin

John Wilson Croker (20 December 1780 – 10 August 1857) was an Anglo-Irish statesman and author. Educated in Dublin, he became a Member of Parliament before being appointed to government posts in Whitehall. He is remembered mostly for his time in office during the late Napoleonic Wars as first secretary to the Admiralty.

== Life ==
He was born in Galway, the only son of John Croker, the surveyor-general of customs and excise in Ireland. He was educated at Trinity College Dublin, where he graduated in 1800. Immediately afterwards he entered Lincoln's Inn, and in 1802 he was called to the Irish bar.

He married Rosamond Pennell, daughter of William Pennell and Elizabeth Pennell (née Carrington))on 22 May 1806, in Waterford, Ireland.

None of his children with Rosamond Pennell survived past 3 years old. He and Rosamond adopted Rosamond's younger sister (who was the 18th child of Rosamond's parents) and she was also (confusingly) named Rosamond Hester Elizabeth Pennell. The younger Rosamond was born in January 1810 in Waterford, Ireland (christened with the surname Pennell). Sometime between birth and 1814, she became part of the Croker family. The name she was better known by was the nickname "Nony" Croker. Nony's portrait by Sir Thomas Lawrence (commissioned by John Croker) is in the collection of the Albright-Knox Art Gallery in Buffalo, New York.

His interest in the French Revolution led him to collect a large number of valuable documents on the subject, which are now in the British Museum. In 1804 he published anonymously Familiar Epistles to J. F. Jones, Esquire, on the State of the Irish Stage, a series of caustic criticisms in verse on the management of the Dublin theatres. The book ran through five editions in one year. Equally successful was the Intercepted Letter from Canton (1805), also anonymous, a satire on Dublin society in the guise of a report on the manners of the Chinese at Quang-tchen on the "Li-fee". During this period a rather scathing poem attributed to Croker led to the suicide of actor John Edwin, husband of Elizabeth Rebecca Edwin. In 1807 he published a pamphlet on The State of Ireland, Past and Present, in which he advocated Catholic emancipation.

He was a distant relation of Thomas Crofton Croker, Irish writer and antiquarian, who served under him in the Admiralty.

== Parliamentary career ==
The following year (1808) Croker entered parliament as member for Downpatrick, obtaining the seat on petition, though he had been unsuccessful at the poll. The acumen displayed in his Irish pamphlet led Spencer Perceval to recommend him to the Duke of Wellington, who had just been appointed to the command of British forces in the Iberian Peninsula, as his deputy in the office of chief secretary for Ireland. This connection led to a friendship which remained unbroken till Wellington's death.

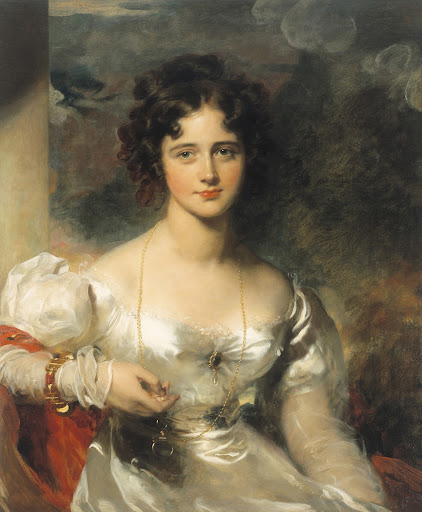
Rosamond Hester Elizabeth Pennell, Croker's adopted daughter. Portrait of Rosamond Croker by Thomas Lawrence, 1827.

The notorious case of the Duke of York in connexion with his abuse of military patronage furnished Croker with an opportunity for distinguishing himself. The speech which he delivered on 14 March 1809, in answer to the charges of Colonel Wardle, was regarded as able; and Croker was appointed to the office of first secretary to the Admiralty on 12 October 1809. He held without interruption under various administrations for more than twenty years. Among the first acts of his official career was the exposure of George Villiers, a fellow official who had misappropriated public funds to the extent of £280,000; Villiers was well regarded at court, and action was taken against him only after Croker threatened resignation. It was soon noted by a First Lord that although Croker described himself as the servant of the Board, in reality, the reverse was true. The second secretary to the Admiralty John Barrow became a close personal friend, and Barrow's eldest son Sir George Barrow, 2nd Baronet married Croker's adopted daughter Nony.

In 1816 he reduced the size of the Royal Navy, and over 1,000 ships were decommissioned and placed in the Reserve Fleet (United Kingdom) or "laid up in ordinary" at various British naval bases. In 1824 he helped found the Athenaeum Club, and when the members voted £2000 for an icehouse, instead he commissioned from sculptor John Henning a full-scale replica in Bath stone of sculptures from the Parthenon, occasioning the widely circulated squib "I'm John Wilson Croker, I do as I please. They ask for an Ice House, I give them—a Frieze".

In 1827 he became the Member of Parliament for Dublin University, having previously sat successively for the boroughs of Athlone, Yarmouth, Bodmin and Aldeburgh. He was made a Privy Councillor in June 1828 and, having secured a pension of £1500 a year, retired from his post at the admiralty in 1830. He was a determined opponent of the Reform Bill, and vowed that he would never sit in a reformed parliament; he left parliament when the Act was passed in 1832. Many of his political speeches were published in pamphlet form, and they show him to have been a vigorous and effective, though somewhat unscrupulous and often virulently personal, party debater. Yet he could on occasion be magnanimous to his opponents: when Lord Althorp during a debate in the Commons, said that while he had figures which refuted Croker's argument he had mislaid them, Croker replied that he would never doubt Althorp's word. Croker had been an ardent supporter of Robert Peel, but finally broke with him when he began to advocate the repeal of the Corn Laws.

== Literary career ==
Croker was for many years one of the leading contributors on literary and historical subjects to the Quarterly Review, with which he had been associated from its foundation. The rancorous spirit in which many of his articles were written did much to embitter party feeling. It also reacted unfavourably on Croker's reputation as a worker in the department of pure literature by bringing political animosities into literary criticism.

He had no sympathy with the younger school of poets who were in revolt against the artificial methods of the 18th century. In April 1833 he savagely criticised Poems, published the previous December by Alfred Tennyson—an attack which, coupled with the death of his friend Arthur Hallam, discouraged the aspiring poet from seeking to publish anything more for nine years. He was also responsible for the famous Quarterly article on John Keats's Endymion. Shelley and Byron blamed this article for bringing about the death of the poet, 'snuffed out', in Byron's phrase, 'by an article' (they, however, attributed the article to William Gifford).

His magnum opus, an edition of Boswell's Life of Johnson (1831) was the subject of an unfavourable review by Macaulay in the Edinburgh Review (a Whig rival/opponent of the Quarterly Review) The main grounds of criticism were echoed by Thomas Carlyle in a less famous review in Fraser's Magazine

- that Croker had added extensive notes which were to little point, being superfluous or declaring Croker's inability to grasp Johnson's point on matters where the reviewers had no difficulty. Macaulay also complained (with numerous examples) of factual errors in the notes; Carlyle of their carping attitude to Johnson's motives (Carlyle, whose father was a stonemason, and who (like Johnson) had scraped a living as a schoolmaster, before writing encyclopedia articles for bread-and-butter wages, also took great exception to one note which took for granted that when Johnson spoke of having lived on 4½ d a day he was disclosing something of which he should have been ashamed to speak)
- that Croker had not preserved the integrity of Boswell's text, but had interpolated text from four other accounts of Johnson (Hawkins, Mrs Thrale etc.), distinguished only from genuine Boswell by being inside brackets, so that "You begin a sentence under Boswell's guidance, thinking to be carried happily through it by the same: but no; in the middle, perhaps after your semi-colon, and some consequent 'for' – starts up one of these Bracket-ligatures, and stitches you in half a page to twenty or thirty pages of a Hawkins, Tyers, Murphy, Piozzi; so that often one must make the old sad reflection, Where we are, we know; whither we are going no man knoweth"

Croker made no immediate reply to Macaulay's attack, but when the first two volumes of Macaulay's History appeared he took the opportunity of pointing out the inaccuracies in the work.

George Birkbeck Hill in his preface to his 1887 edition of Boswell endorses much of Macaulay's criticism of Croker, but adds, "I should be wanting in justice were I not to acknowledge that I owe much to the labours of Mr Croker". Hill observed that Croker was "not deeply versed in books", was "shallow in himself", did not understand Johnson's strong character, seemed inadequately acquainted with Johnson's writings, failed to grasp Boswell's flair as a biographer, and "is careless in small matters, and his blunders are numerous":

Yet he has added considerably to our knowledge of Johnson. He knew men who had intimately known both the hero and his biographer, and he gathered much that but for his care would have been lost for ever. He was diligent and successful in his search after Johnson's letters, of so many of which Boswell with all his persevering and pushing diligence had not been able to get a sight.

Croker was occupied for several years on an annotated edition of Alexander Pope's works. It was left unfinished at the time of his death, but it was afterwards completed by Whitwell Elwin and William John Courthope. He died at St Albans Bank, Hampton.

Croker was generally supposed to be the original from which Benjamin Disraeli drew the character of "Rigby" in Coningsby, because he had for many years had the sole management of the estates of the Marquess of Hertford, the "Lord Monmouth" of the story. Hostile portrayals of Croker can also be found in the novels Florence Macarthy by Lady Morgan (a political opponent whom Croker subjected to notoriously savage reviews in the Quarterly) and The Anglo-Irish of the Nineteenth Century (1828) by John Banim.

The chief works of Croker not already mentioned were:

- Stories for Children from the History of England (1817), which provided the model for Scott's Tales of a Grandfather
- Letters on the Naval War with America
- A Reply to the Letters of Malachi Malagrowther (1826)
- Military Events of the French Revolution of 1830 (1831)
- a translation of Bassompierre's Embassy to England (1819)

He also wrote several lyrical pieces of some merit, such as the Songs of Trafalgar (1806) and The Battles of Talavera (1809). He edited the Suffolk Papers (1823), Hervey's Memoirs of the Court of George II (1817), the Letters of Mary Lepel, Lady Hervey (1821–1822), and Walpole's Letters to Lord Hertford (1824). His memoirs, diaries and correspondence were edited by Louis J. Jennings in 1884 under the title of The Croker Papers (3 vols.).

== Legacy ==
Croker Bay, named by Sir William Edward Parry.

Cape Croker on Ontario's Bruce Peninsula is also named after him by Henry Wolsey Bayfield.

== Books and articles about Croker ==
- Bates, William (1883). "Right Hon. John Wilson Croker" . The Maclise Portrait-Gallery of "Illustrious Literary Characters" . Illustrated by Daniel Maclise (1 ed.). London: Chatto and Windus. pp. 72–74 – via Wikisource.
- C. I. Hamilton (2000). "John Wilson Croker: Patronage and Clientage at the Admiralty, 1809–1857". Historical Journal. 43: 49–77. doi:10.1017/S0018246X99008936. S2CID 153657357.
- Portsmouth, Robert (2010). John Wilson Croker: Irish Ideas and the Invention of Modern Conservatism. Dublin: Irish Academic Press.
- Thomas, William (2000). The Quarrel of Macaulay and Croker: Politics and History in the Age of Reform. Oxford University Press, Oxford. ISBN 978-0-19-820864-8.
- Harris, Nigel (2015). Footnotes to History: The Personal Realm of John Wilson Croker, Secretary to the Admiralty (1809–1830), a "Group Family", ISBN 978-1-84519-746-9. Sussex Academic Press, Brighton & Eastbourne.

Political offices
Preceded by William Wellesley-Pole	Secretary to the Admiralty; 1809–1830	Succeeded by George Elliot
Parliament of the United Kingdom
Preceded by Edward Southwell Ruthven	Member of Parliament for Downpatrick; 1807–1812	Succeeded by Charles Stewart Hawthorne
Preceded by John Frewen-Turner	Member of Parliament for Athlone; 1812–1818	Succeeded by John Gordon
Preceded by John Taylor; William Mount	Member of Parliament for Yarmouth; 1819–1820; With: Sir Peter Pole, Bt	Succeeded by Sir Peter Pole, Bt; Theodore Henry Broadhead
Preceded by Davies Gilbert; Thomas Bradyll	Member of Parliament for Bodmin; 1820–1826; With: Davies Gilbert	Succeeded by Davies Gilbert; Horace Seymour
Preceded by Joshua Walker; James Blair	Member of Parliament for Aldeburgh; 1826–1827; With: Joshua Walker	Succeeded by Joshua Walker; Wyndham Lewis
Preceded by William Plunket	Member of Parliament for Dublin University; 1827–1830	Succeeded by Thomas Lefroy
Preceded by Marquess of Douro; Spencer Kilderbee	Member of Parliament for Aldeburgh; 1830–1832; With: Marquess of Douro	(Constituency abolished)
