= John Edwin =

John Edwin may refer to:

- John Edwin (1749–1790), English actor
- John Edwin (1768–1805), his son, English actor
