= Robert Cooke (organist) =

English organist and composer

Robert Cooke (1768 – 22/23 August 1814) was an English organist and composer, from 1802 organist of Westminster Abbey.

== Life ==
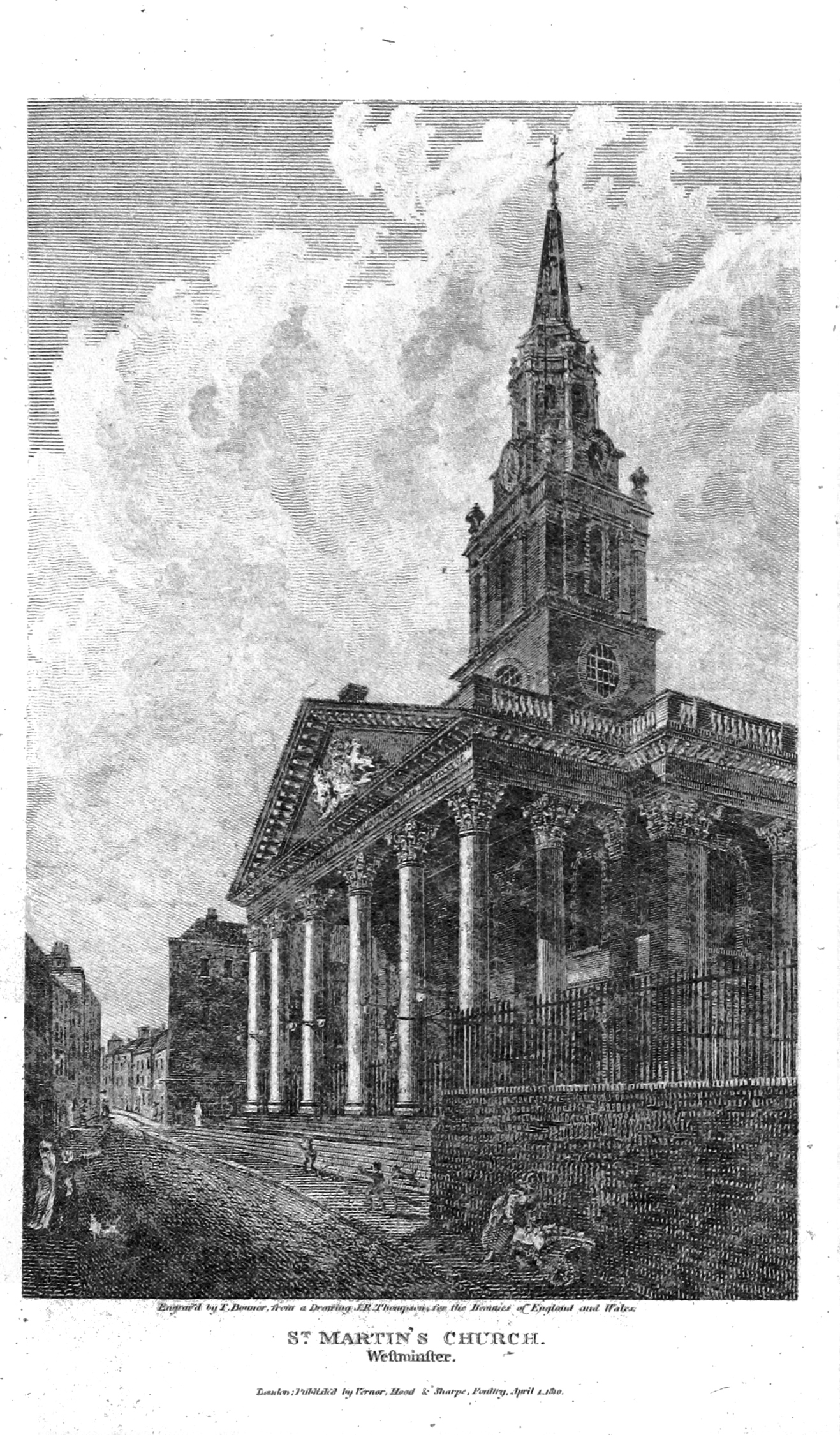
St Martin-in-the-Fields, from an 1820 publication

Cooke was born in Westminster, London, son of the organist and composer Benjamin Cooke; he succeeded his father as organist of the church of St Martin-in-the-Fields in 1793. He was appointed organist at Westminster Abbey on the death of Samuel Arnold in 1802, and was master of the choristers of the Abbey by 1805.

On 22 or 23 August 1814 he drowned in the River Thames near Millbank; it was assumed to be suicide. He was buried in the west cloister of Westminster Abbey.

== Compositions ==
Cooke wrote an Evening Service in C (1806), and a collection of chants for the choir of the Abbey. He also wrote an "Ode to Friendship", and several songs and glees, of which a collection of eight was published in 1805.

Cultural offices
Preceded by Samuel Arnold	Organist and Master of the Choristers of Westminster Abbey; 1803–1814	Succeeded by George Ebenezer Williams
