= John Reeves (activist) =

British judge and public official (1752–1829)

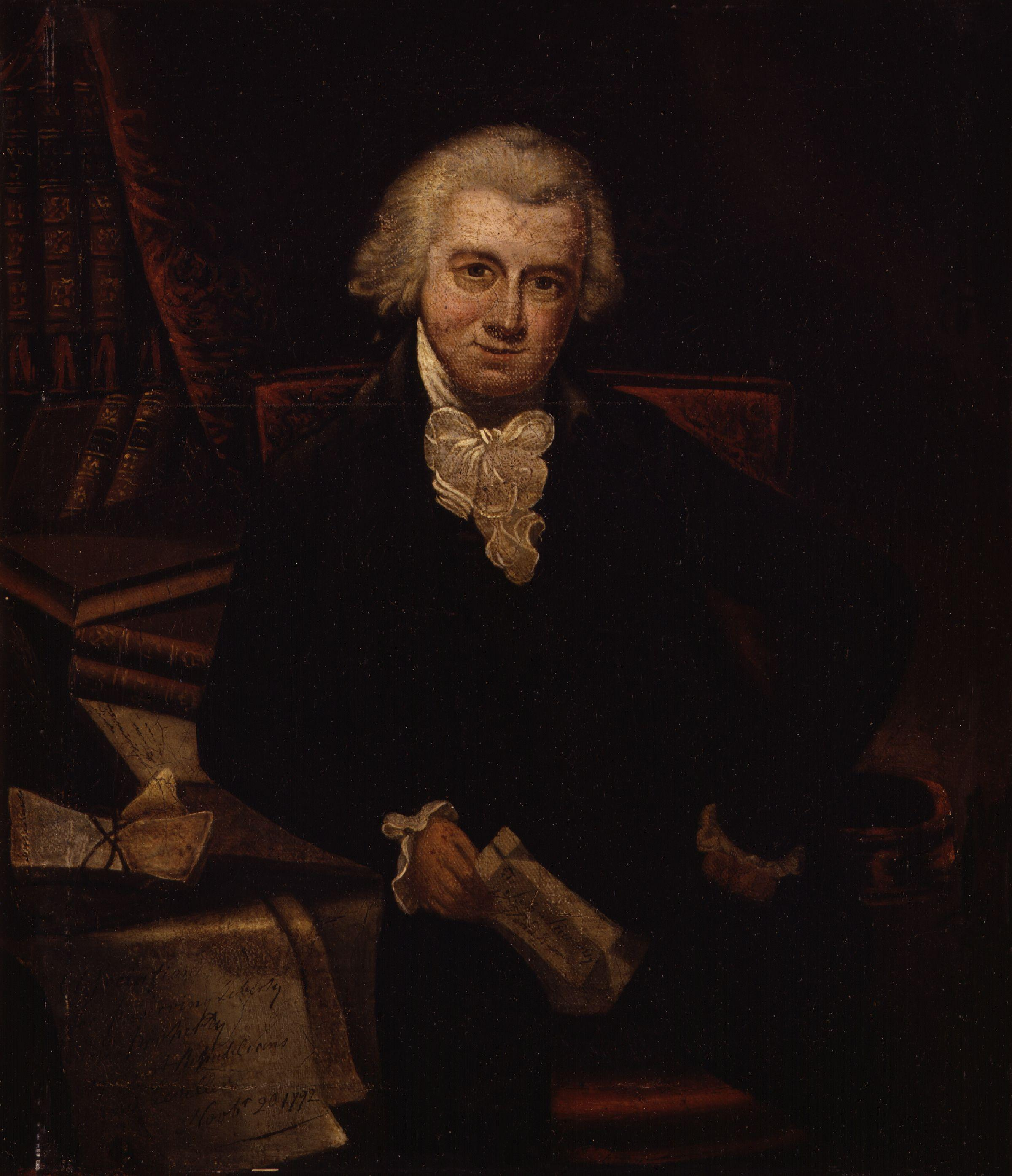
- Portrait of John Reeves by Thomas Hardy

1st Chief Justice of Newfoundland
- In office 1791–1792
- Preceded by: Position established
- Succeeded by: D'Ewes Coke

Personal details
- Born: November 20, 1752 London, England, Great Britain
- Died: August 7, 1829 (aged 76) London, England, U.K.
- Party: Tory
- Education: Eton College; Merton College, Oxford; Queen's College, Oxford
- Occupation: Magistrate

John Reeves (20 November 1752 – 7 August 1829) was a legal historian, civil servant, British magistrate, conservative activist, and the first Chief Justice of Newfoundland. In 1792 he founded the Association for Preserving Liberty and Property against Republicans and Levellers, for the purpose suppressing the "seditious publications" authored by British supporters of the French Revolution—most famously, Thomas Paine's Rights of Man. Because of his counter-revolutionary actions he was regarded by many of his contemporaries as "the saviour of the British state"; in the years after his death, he was warmly remembered as the saviour of ultra-Toryism.

== Life ==
Reeves was educated at Eton College and Merton College, Oxford, being elected in 1778 as a Fellow of The Queen's College, Oxford. In 1779 he was called to the bar and held the public offices counsel to the Royal Mint; law clerk to the Board of Trade; and superintendent of Aliens. Following the Gordon Riots of 1780, he drafted London and Westminster Police Bill 1785 at the request of Home Secretary Lord Sydney, which was defeated in British Parliament as too oppressive and resembling French police of the time, but passed in Ireland despite the opposition of local Whigs as the Dublin Police Act 1786, founding the first modern police force on the British Isles and providing inspiration for Robert Peel when he established later police forces in the UK).

Reeves served two terms as Chief Justice of Newfoundland in 1791 and 1792. In his 1793 book History of the Government of Newfoundland, Reeves largely blamed the fish merchants for the economic issues impacting local administration, an attitude which inspired political activist William Carson and historian D. W. Prowse. In 1793, Reeves returned to England to accept the post of Receiver of Public Offices—paymaster to the stipendiary magistrates that had been created under the Middlesex Justices Act 1792 (32 Geo. 3. c. 53).

Reeves had been elected as a Fellow of the Society of Antiquaries in 1789 and the next year was elected a Fellow of the Royal Society. In 1793 he was appointed as high steward of the Manor and Liberty of Savoy and the King's Printer in 1800.

=== The Association ===
Reeves campaigned against Jacobinism by founding at the Crown and Anchor tavern on 20 November 1792 the Association for Preserving Liberty and Property against Republicans and Levellers. According to Boyd Hilton, the Association was "staggeringly successful, outstripping even the Constitutional societies", with more than 2,000 local branches established before long. They disrupted radical meetings, attacked printers of Thomas Paine's works, initiated prosecutions for sedition and published loyalist pamphlets. The Crown and Anchor association met for the final time on 21 June 1793. These loyalist associations mostly disappeared within a year "after successfully suppressing the organizations of their opponents". The leading opposition Whig Charles James Fox denounced the Association's publications and claimed that had they been printed earlier in the century they would have been prosecuted as treasonable Jacobite tracts due to their advocacy of the divine right of kings. In a speech on 10 December 1795, Fox described the association as a system designed to run the country through "the infamy of spies and intrigues".

Reeves was upset that he had received "not one single mark of civility" from William Pitt the Younger's government for his loyalist activities. Thereafter, Reeves held an animosity towards Pitt and was a supporter of the Addington administration in the early 19th century. William Cobbett claimed in 1830 that Reeves had told him that he hated the Pitt administration and its principles and that bitter experience had taught him that one must either kiss or kick the government's arse.

=== Thoughts on the English government ===
In 1795 Reeves published anonymously the first of his Thoughts on the English Government, addressed to the quiet good sense of the People of England in a series of Letters. Reeves claimed that "I am not a Citizen of the World...I am an Englishman". In a controversial passage Reeves likened the monarchy to a tree:

...the Government of England is a Monarchy; the Monarch is the antient stock from which have sprung those goodly branches of the Legislature, the Lords and Commons, that at the same time give ornament to the Tree, and afford shelter to those who seek protection under it. But these are still only branches, and derive their origin and their nutriment from their common parent; they may be lopped off, and the Tree is a Tree still; shorn indeed of its honours, but not, like them, cast into the fire. The Kingly Government may go on, in all its functions, without Lords or Commons...

In 1795 a group of Whigs, Fox among them, persuaded the Attorney General to prosecute Reeves for "libel on the British Constitution" due to his tree metaphor. A parliamentary committee was set up to determine the authorship of the Thoughts. Edmund Burke claimed that the prosecution of Reeves was a pretext for the spread of Foxite views. He considered the tree metaphor "slovenly" and wrote that he should not have criticised 18th century Whigs. However, he added that Reeves was still a person of "considerable Abilities" whose argument in the Thoughts, "with a commonly fair allowance, is perfectly true" and was "neither more nor less than the Law of the Land". In a letter to William Windham in November 1795, Burke wrote that he considered the Reeves case ironic because Reeves was being criticised by people whose views endangered all three parts of the British constitution:

Heraldry of the constitution! Whether the Lords and Commons or the King should walk first in the procession! Which is the Root, which the Branches! In good faith, they cut up the Root and the Branches! A fine Business of Law Grammar, which is the Substantive, which the adjective. – When an author lays down the whole as to be revered and adhered to, – at any former time would any one have made it a cause of quarrel, that he had given the priority to any part? especially to that part which was attacked and exposed? My opinion is, that, if you do not kick this business out with Scorn, Reeves ought to Petition and to desire to be heard by himself and his Council.

Reeves was acquitted of libel, although the jury censured him for writing a "very improper publication". Reeves published anonymously the Second Letter in 1799 and in 1800 the Third and Fourth Letters of his Thoughts.

In 1801 Reeves published Considerations on the coronation oath where he supported the king's opinion that the coronation oath prohibited Roman Catholics from Parliament. He also supported his dismissal of the Pitt government. Reeves further claimed that presbyterianism rather than popery was the greatest threat to Church and state.

== Publications ==
- An Enquiry into the Nature of Property and Estates as defined by the Laws of England (1779).
- History of English Law (five volumes, 1783 to 1829).
- A Chart of Penal Laws, exhibiting by lines and colours an historical view of crimes and punishments, according to the law of England (1779).
- Legal Considerations on the Regency, as far as it regards Ireland (1789).
- A History of the Law of Shipping and Navigation (1792) A handbook for the Board of Trade
- History of the Government of the Island of Newfoundland (1793).
- The Malecontent: A Letter from an Associator to Francis Plowden, Esq. (1794).
- Thoughts on the English Government (four letters, 1795 to 1800).
- A Collation of the Hebrew and Greek Texts of the Psalms (1800).
- Considerations on the Coronation Oath to maintain the Protestant Reformed Religion, and the Settlement of the Church of England (1801).
- Discussions on the question of whether inhabitants of the United States, born there before the Independence, are, on coming to this Kingdom, to be considered as natural born [British] subjects, written in 1809 and 1810, circulated privately, then reprinted in George Chalmers's Opinions of Eminent Lawyers on various point of English Jurisprudence (London 1814) vol. 2, page 422 et seq., then reprinted as a separate tract (London 1816), then published in the American Law Journal, edited by Hall, vol. 6, page 30 et seq. (1817).

== Notes ==
Legal offices
Preceded by	Chief Justice of Newfoundland; 1791–1793	Succeeded by D'Ewes Coke
