= In vino veritas =

Latin phrase about speaking truth while drunk

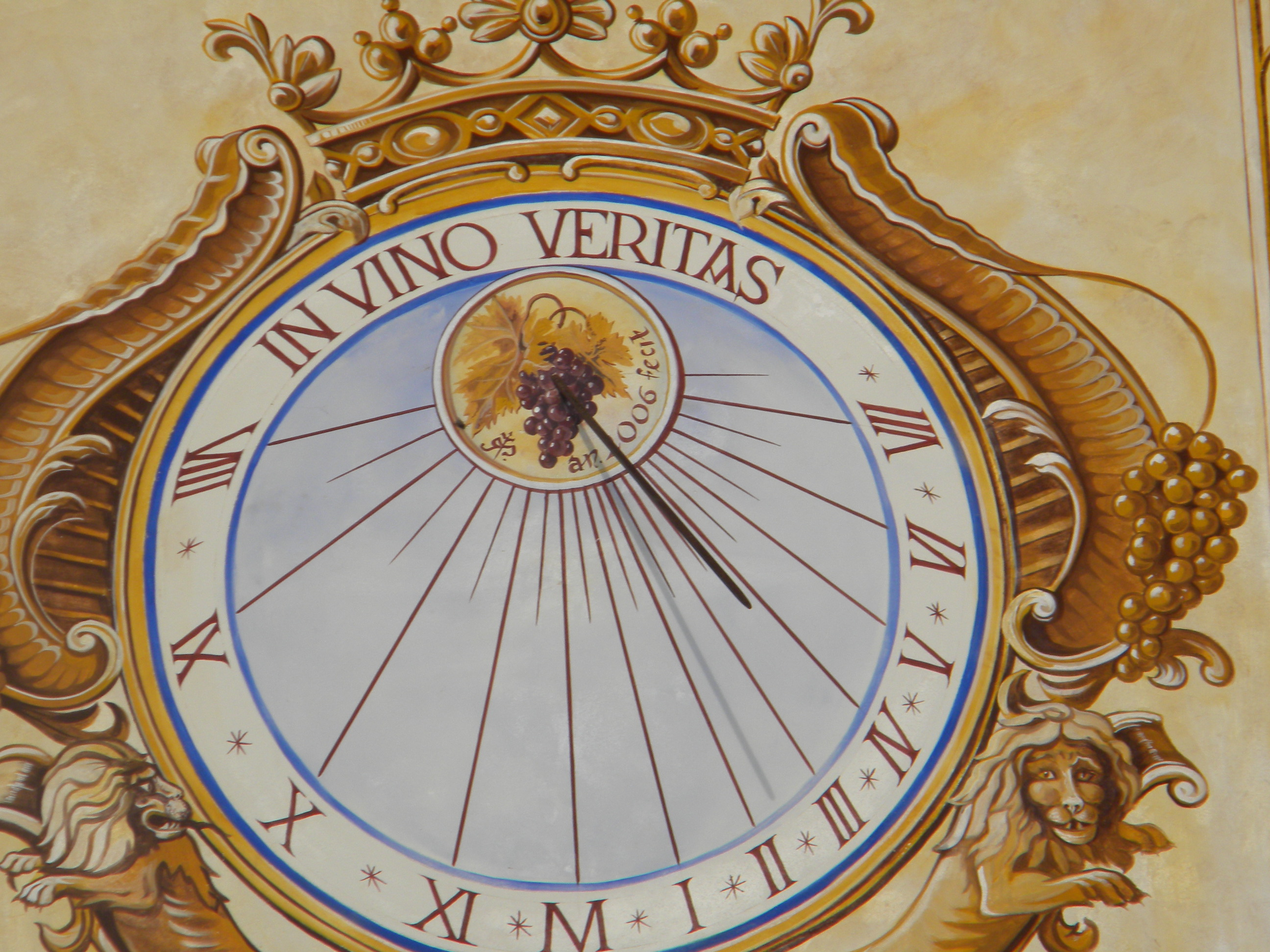
Sun dial in the Chateau de Pommard, France

In vino veritas is a Latin phrase that means 'in wine, there is truth', suggesting a person under the influence of alcohol is more likely to speak their hidden thoughts and desires. The phrase is sometimes continued as, in vīnō vēritās, in aquā sānitās, 'in wine there is truth, in water there is (good) health'. Similar phrases exist across cultures and languages.

The expression, together with its counterpart in Ancient Greek: Ἐν οἴνῳ ἀλήθεια, romanized: En oinō alētheia, is found in Erasmus' Adagia, I.vii.17. Pliny the Elder's Naturalis historia contains an early allusion to the phrase. The Greek expression is quoted by Athenaeus of Naucratis in his Deipnosophistae; it is now traced back to a poem by Alcaeus.

Herodotus asserts that if the Persians decided something while drunk, they made a rule to reconsider it when sober. Authors after Herodotus have added that if the Persians made a decision while sober, they made a rule to reconsider it when they were drunk (Histories, book 1, section 133). The Roman historian Tacitus described how the Germanic peoples kept counsel at feasts, where they believed that drunkenness prevented the participants from dissembling.

== Western Europe ==
In Western European countries the same idea has been incorporated in local language versions.

- Danish: Fra børn og fulde folk skal man høre sandheden, 'from children and drunk people, you will hear the truth'.
- Dutch, similarly: Kinderen en dronkaards spreken de waarheid, 'children and drunk people speak the truth'; De wijn in het lijf, het hart in de mond, 'wine in the body, heart in the mouth'; and Een dronken mond spreekt 's harten grond, 'A drunken mouth speaks from the bottom of the heart'.
- English: 'what soberness conceals, drunkenness reveals'; 'he speaks in his drink what he thought in his drouth'; and 'a drunk man's words are a sober man's thoughts'.
- Finnish: Kännisen suusta totuus tulee 'the truth comes from the mouth of a drunkard'.
- French: ce que le sobre tient au cœur est sur la langue du buveur, 'what the sober hold in their heart is on the drinker's tongue'.
- German: Trunkner Mund verrät des Herzens Grund, 'a drunken mouth reveals the heart's meaning'; and Trunkener Mund tut Wahrheit kund, 'a drunken mouth proclaims the truth'.
- Icelandic: Öl er innri maður, 'ale reveals the inner man'.
- Spanish: despues de beber cada uno dice su parecer, 'after drinking everyone speaks their opinion'; cuando el vino entra, echa el secreto afuera, 'when the wine enters, it throws the secret out'; and los niños y los borrachos dicen la verdad, 'children and drunk people speak the truth'.

== Central Europe ==
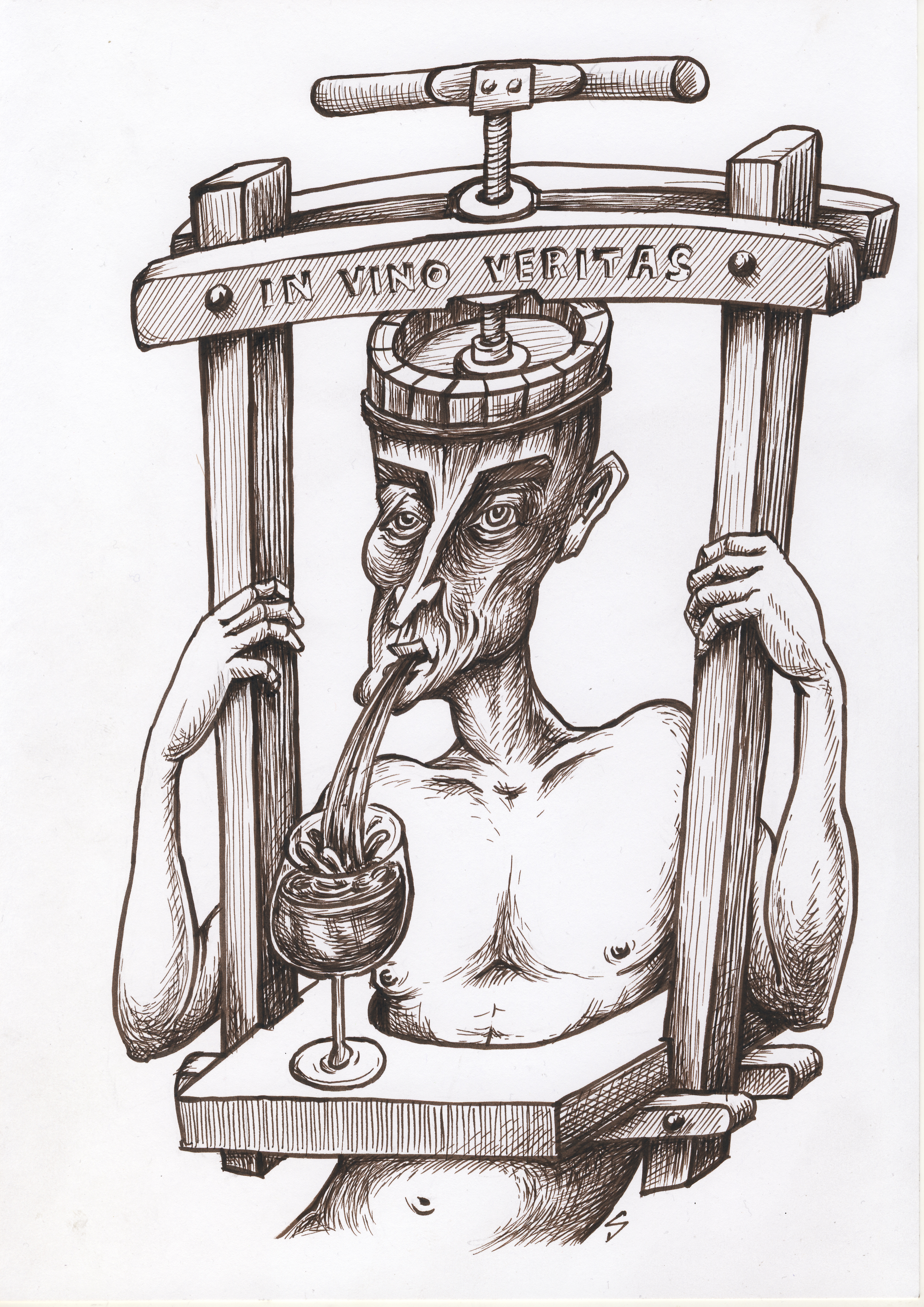

- Czech: Ve víně je pravda.
- Hungarian: Borban az igazság.
- Latvian: Vīnā ir taisnība.
- Lithuanian: Vyne tiesa.
- Polish: W winie prawda.
- Romanian: în vin este adevărul.
- Russian: Что у трезвого на уме, то у пьяного на языке, 'what a sober man has in his mind, the drunk one has on his tongue'; and Истина в вине.
- Serbian: Пијан говори што трезан мисли.
- Slovak: Vo víne je pravda.
- Slovene: V vinu je resnica.

== Asia ==
- Chinese: 酒後吐真言, 'after wine blurts truthful speech'.
- Japanese: 酒は本心を表す, Sake wa honshin o arawasu, 'alcohol reveals true feelings'.
- Persian: مستی و راستی, 'drunkenness and truthfulness'.
- Tagalog: Nasa Inuman ang Katotohanan, 'truth is in drinking'.

=== Talmud ===
The Babylonian Talmud (תלמוד בבלי) contains the passage, "נכנס יין יצא סוד", 'wine enters, secret goes out'. It continues, "בשלשה דברים אדם ניכר בכוסו ובכיסו ובכעסו", 'in three things is a man revealed: in his wine goblet, in his purse, and in his wrath'. (In the original Hebrew, the words for 'his goblet' (koso), 'his purse' (keeso, lit. 'his pocket'), and 'his wrath' (ka'aso) rhyme, and there is a further play on words, as they all use the similar set of consonants 'כ(ע)ס'.)

In Hebrew Gematria, the value of the word sod, 'secret', is equal to the value of the word yain, 'wine', making it another play on words: something of value enters, and something of equal value exits.

There is a similar saying in Yiddish: וואס בײַ א ניכטערן אויף די לינג, איז בײַ א שיכור'ן אויף די צינג, lit. 'what a sober one has on its lung a drunken has on its tongue'.

== Africa ==
- Chibemba: Ubwalwa nisokolola twebo, 'beer makes one reveal secrets'.
- Chichewa: Phika mowa unve chinapha amako, 'brew beer and you will hear what killed your mother'.
- Ewe: Gnatepe le kopo'a me, 'truth lies in the cup'.
- Tetela: Olamba háté kashi, 'alcohol does not lie'.

== Music ==
In the 1770s, Benjamin Cooke wrote a glee by the title of "In Vino Veritas". His lyrics (with modern punctuation):

Round, round with the glass, boys, as fast as you can,
Since he who don't drink cannot be a true man.
For if truth is in wine, then 'tis all but a whim
To think a man's true when the wine's not in him.
Drink, drink, then, and hold it a maxim divine
That there's virtue in truth, and there's truth in good wine!

— Benjamin Cooke, "In Vino Veritas"

== See also ==
- List of Latin phrases
- Never have I ever
- Truth serum
- Sub rosa
