= Association for Preserving Liberty and Property against Republicans and Levellers =

18th-century English loyalist group

The Association for Preserving Liberty and Property against Republicans and Levellers, also known as the Crown and Anchor Society or Crown and Anchor Association, was an English loyalist, anti-Jacobin, anti-Radical society active between late 1792 and June 1793.

The Association was founded on 20 November 1792 by John Reeves at the Crown and Anchor tavern in the Strand, London. It proved to be "staggeringly successful, outstripping even the Constitutional societies", with more than 2,000 local branches established before long. They disrupted Radicals' meetings, attacked printers of Thomas Paine's works, initiated prosecutions for sedition and published loyalist pamphlets. A letter to Reeves of 1792 proposed the use of ballads for propaganda:

It occurred to me, that anything written in voice [?verse] & especially to an Old English tune … made a more fixed Impression on the minds of the Younger and Lower Class of People, than any written prose, which was often forgotten as soon as Read … By printing copies of the enclosed, as Common Ballads, and putting them in the hands of individuals, or by twenties in the hands of Ballad Singers who might sing them for the sake of selling them, I own I shall not be displeased to hear Re-echoed by Every Little Boy in the Streets during the Christmas Holidays – Long May Old England, Possess Good Cheer and Jollity Liberty, and Property and no Equality.

The Crown and Anchor association met for the final time on 21 June 1793. These loyalist associations mostly disappeared within a year "after successfully suppressing the organizations of their opponents".

== Effects outside England ==
In 1792–93 Welsh towns established local associations on Reeves’s model; elites and clergy translated and adapted English legal‑moral texts into Welsh to reinforce order. This made the Welsh language a medium of loyalist propaganda for church and state, a fact used by historian Hywel Davies to argue against Wales having oriented itself away from the Crown and towards Revolutionary France during the tumultuous 1790s.

== See also ==
- Republicanism in the United Kingdom
- Levellers
