= John Gordon (Athlone MP) =

Irish Member of Parliament

Member of the House of Commons of the United Kingdom for Athlone
- In office 30 June 1818 – 24 March 1820
- Preceded by: John Wilson Croker
- Succeeded by: John McClintock

Personal details
- Born: 20 October 1794
- Died: 7 May 1843 (aged 48)

John Gordon (20 October 1794 – 7 May 1843) was an Irish politician who served as a Member of Parliament (MP) for Athlone. He was a son of the Bishop George Gordon.

== See also ==
- List of MPs elected in the 1818 United Kingdom general election
