= The Baron Kinkvervankotsdorsprakingatchdern =

1781 opera by Samuel Arnold and Miles Peter Andrews

- Pasticcio by Samuel Arnold
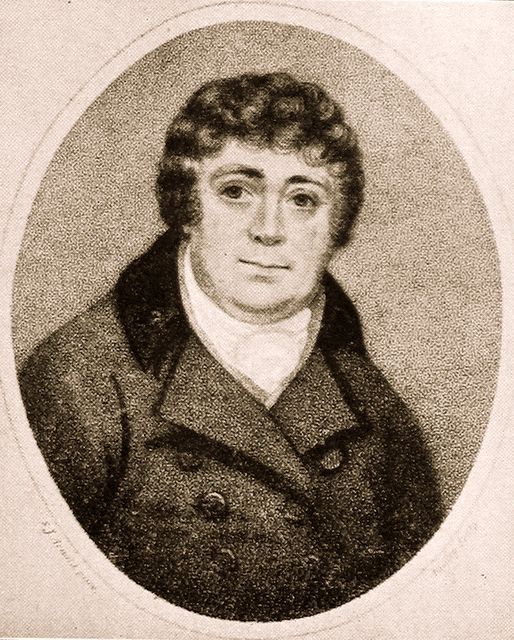
- Samuel Arnold
- Librettist: Miles Peter Andrews
- Language: English
- Based on: Modern Anecdote of the Ancient Family of the Kinkvervankotsdarsprakengotchderns: A Tale for Christmas 1779 by Elizabeth Craven (1779)
- Premiere: 9 July 1781; Little Theatre in the Haymarket, London

The Baron Kinkvervankotsdorsprakingatchdern is an 18th-century English language comic opera pasticcio with music by Samuel Arnold and a libretto by Miles Peter Andrews. The opera consists of a prologue by Frederick Pilon, three acts, and an epilogue by Edward Topham. The first performance was at the Little Theatre in Haymarket, London, in July 1781. Baron "played during three nights of tumultuous disapprobation, and [was] then withdrawn".

The opera was based on a novel by Elizabeth Craven, Modern Anecdote of the Ancient Family of the Kinkvervankotsdarsprakengotchderns: A Tale for Christmas 1779. Craven's novel, published in 1779, was dedicated to Horace Walpole.

== Synopsis ==
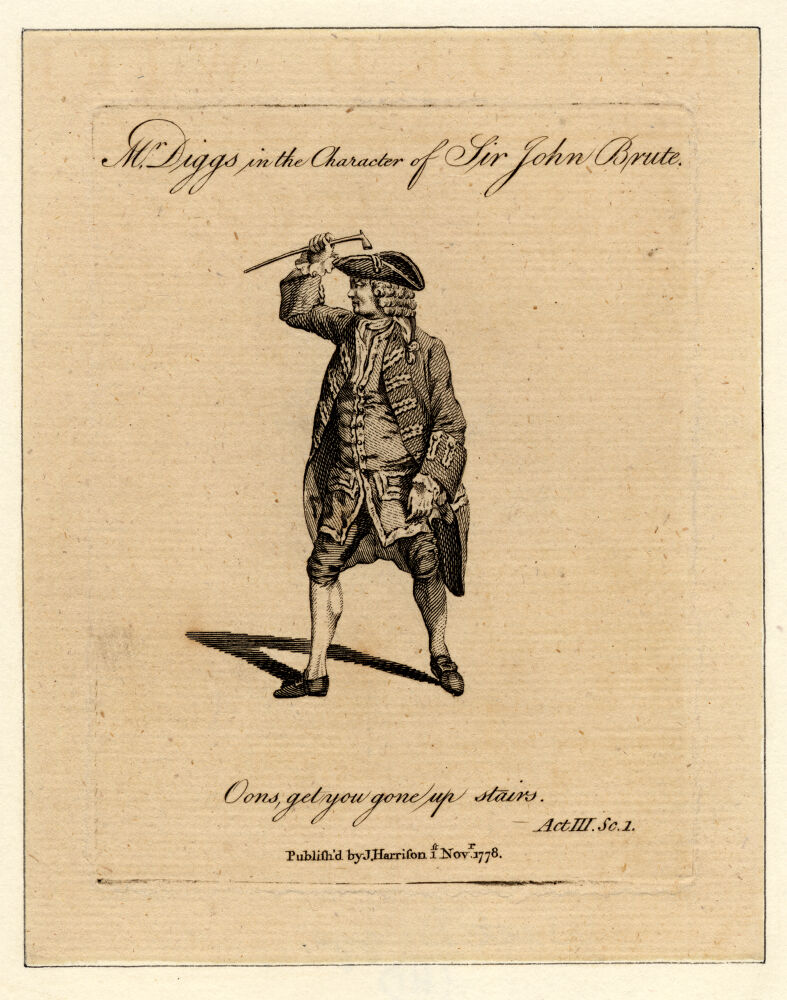
West Digges, who played the title role in Baron

Setting: The castle of Baron Kinkvervankotsdorsprakingatchdern, near Göttingen.

The Baron, whose name is not mentioned in the opera, has a daughter named Cecil. She is in love with a Dutch soldier, Franzel Van Botherham. Franzel's father, Mynheer Van Botherham, arrives with his wife to foreclose the mortgage on the Baron's castle. The Baron speaks constantly of his ancestors, whose pictures fill the walls of his home.

Both the Baron and Mynheer disapprove of the match. The Baron wants Cecil to marry Captain Hogrestan, an old and braggardly soldier. Mynheer wants Franzel to marry an heiress. The Baron "locks his daughter in a castle chamber, whence she escapes by piling the family pictures in a heap".

When Franzel and Cecil are wed, the Baron says he will never forgive her for dishonoring the family name by marrying beneath her. Mynheer and his family welcome Cecil and discourage her from trying to convince her father to accept the union.

== Roles ==
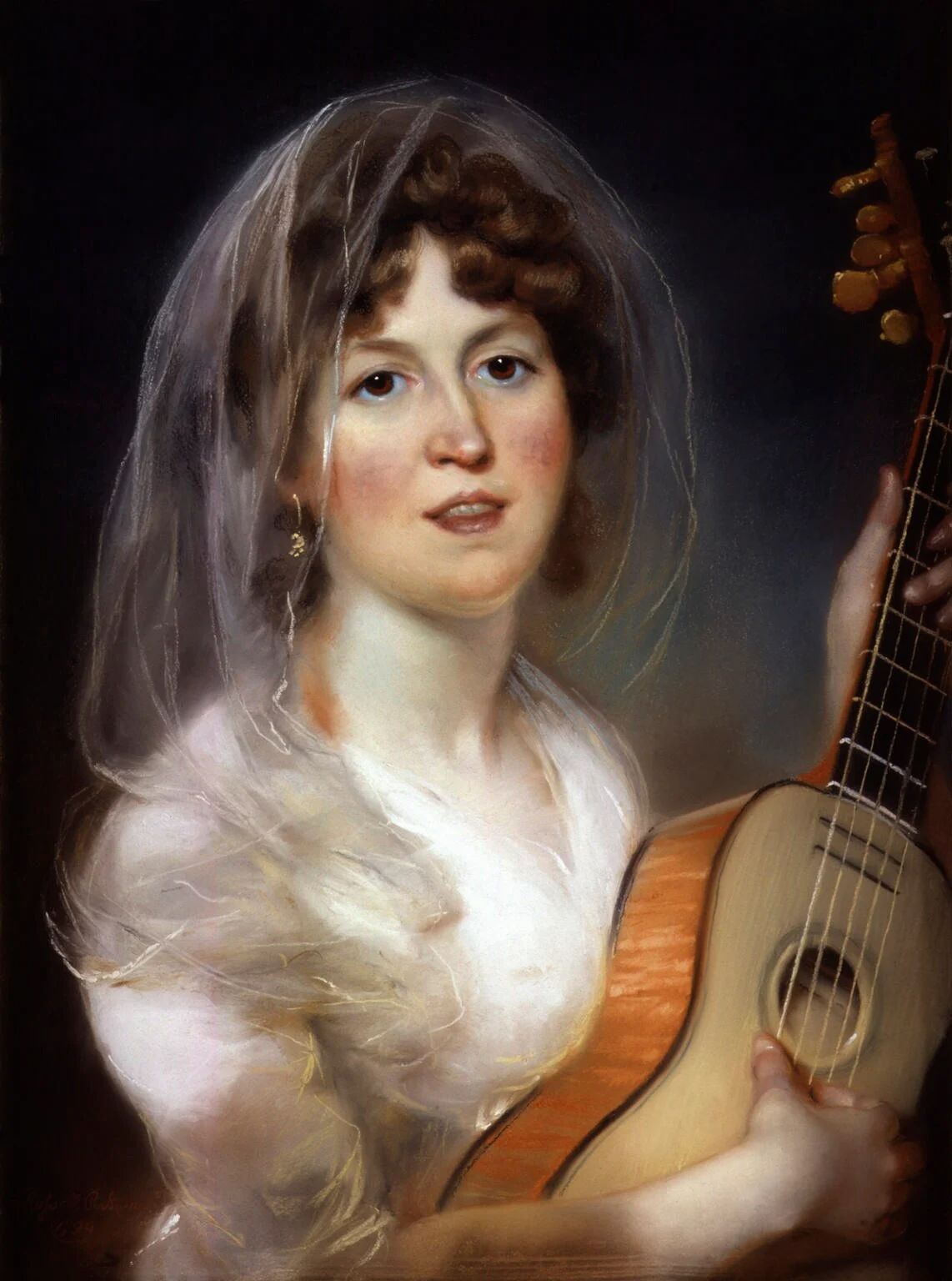
Miss Harper, who played Cecil, the Baron's daughter

Roles, voice types, cast of the 1781 premiere
Role	Voice type	Little Theatre, Haymarket, 1781 (Note: The cast lists in both the published libretto and the songbook give only surnames with honorifics, e.g., "Mr. Digges". Where given names can be identified, they are inserted as parentheses, e.g., "Mr. (West) Digges".)
The Baron		Mr. (West) Digges
Cecil, the Baron's daughter		Miss (Elizabeth) Harper
Captain Hogrestan		Mr. (John) Palmer
Pangloss		Mr. (John) Edwin
Mynheer Van Botherham		Mr. (Richard) Wilson
Mefrow Van Botherham		Mrs. (Richard) Webb (née Lydia Child)
German Doctor		Mr. (Robert) Baddeley
Franzel Van Botherham		Mr. (Charles) Wood
Rubrick		Mr. R. (Robert) Palmer (Note: Robert Palmer was the brother of John Palmer, who played Hogrestan.)
Dagram		Mr. (Ralph) Wewitzer
Serjeant		Mr. Stanton
Grootrump		Mrs. Edwin (Sarah Walmsley) (Note: Walmsley was the long-term partner of John Edwin, who played Pangloss.)

== Performances ==
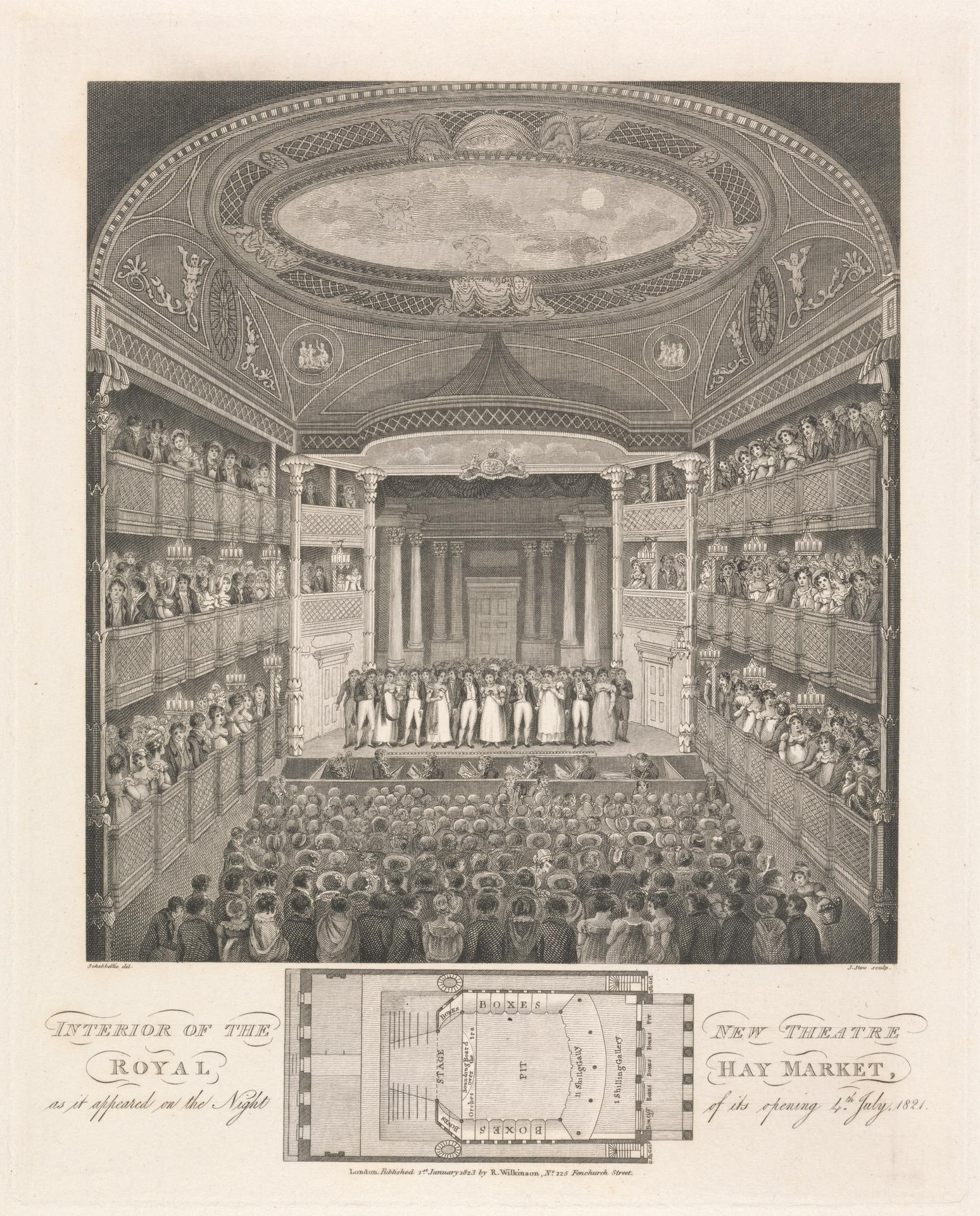
Interior of the Theatre Royal, Haymarket

The first performance was 9 July 1781 at the Little Theatre in the Haymarket. It was presented on a double bill with Arthur Murphy's 1756 play The Apprentice following Baron. The second performance was 10 July and the third and final on 11 July. Nine days after the premiere of Baron, a second collaboration by Arnold and Craven, The Silver Tankard, or, The Point at Portsmouth, was given at the same theatre.

West Digges, well regarded as Thomas Wolsey in Henry VIII, Caratach in Fletcher's Bonduca, and Macheath in Gay's The Beggar's Opera, was the Baron. Mynheer Van Botherham was played by Richard Wilson, who created the part of Don Jerome, the lead in the hit 1775 opera The Duenna. Frenzel was Charles Wood, who had appeared in the opera The Flitch of Bacon. The Baron's daughter, Cecil, was Elizabeth Harper—later billed as "Mrs. Bannister" after her marriage—who had played an acclaimed Polly Peachum in 1778 and Rosina in a version of Beaumarchais's The Barber of Seville called The Spanish Barber. John Palmer, who created the role of Sir Joseph Surface in Sheridan's The School for Scandal, was Hogrestan. The rotund comedienne Mrs Webb, long associated with the theatre in Haymarket, played the role of Mefrow Van Botherham. The character actor Ralph Wewitzer, who excelled in low comedy parts, was Dagran. The comedian John Edwin the Elder was Pangloss. Edwin's long-term partner, Sarah Walmsley—billed as "Mrs. Edwin"—made her debut on the London stage as Grootrump.

The Biographia Dramatica states Baron was performed in full only once and the two subsequent performances had to be "forced on the public". A contemporary account in the Edinburgh Magazine reported:

Tuesday evening this comedy was attempted to be performed a second time; but there being a party against its representation, it could not be said to be by any means allowed a fair hearing, as the house was a scene of noise and confusion from the beginning of the second act. [The audience] had recourse to missiles, instantly attacking the performers with apples, halfpence, canes, and lighted candles.

The third performance ended early because the audience rioted. The Edinburgh Magazine continued:

The first act went off pretty smoothly, but on commencement of the second the opposition became so violent that the author was induced to send Mr. Palmer on to inform the audience that since they made so strenuous and opposition (the actor, when he spoke these words, pointed to an apple on the stage, which created a temporary good humour), it was the desire of the author that the piece be withdrawn. The curtain dropped at the beginning of the third act.

Andrews noted in the preface to the published libretto that "the very extraordinary circumstances that attended the hearing, or rather the not hearing, of this piece with the subsequent contentions which it occasioned would seem to call sufficiently for its publication; these circumstances, however, the Author would certainly have foregone," and wrote at length about the criticisms of his work.

== Critical analysis ==
The Monthly Review observed "the dialogue of this piece ... is not very chaste. A certain pruriency of the imagination seems to keep the Author in perpetual pursuit of double entendre, which sometimes he effects adroitly enough, and often but clumsily." The Critical Review passed over the libretto in two sentences: "This piece would afford ample material for the severity of criticism but 'We war not with the dead!' It has been tried, condemned, and executed; and peace be to its manes!"

A modern scholar of Andrews, Laura Morrow, calls Baron the least successful of Andrews's stage works. Morrow says "The Baron probably failed because of its weak plot and generally unsympathetic characters" and the show's comedy was "largely predictable and repetitious". The theatre historian W. J. Macqueen-Pope in his book on the Haymarket said

That handy little title to the musical show, The Baron Kinkvervankotsdorsprakingatchdern, met the fate it deserved. How could a play with a name like that succeed! It ran for three nights, each a stormy disapproving one. It was an adaptation from a novel by ... Lady Craven ... She may have been a good Margravine, but she was no good as a dramatist. The audience appears to have thought the play vulgar and suggestive, at one and the same time and would have none of it. Miles Peter Andrews, who is responsible for the stage version, drew a complete blank.

== Publication ==
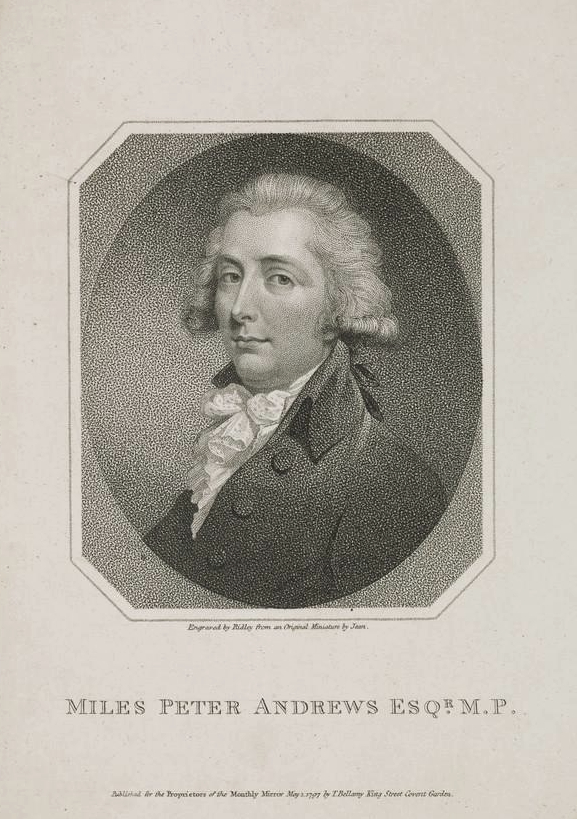
Miles Peter Andrews

The libretto was published in London in 1781. Andrews dedicated it to George Colman the Elder, the playwright who bought the Haymarket Theatre in 1777 and owned it until his death in 1794.

The manuscript of the libretto is in the Huntington Library in California as part of the collection assembled by John Larpent during his service as the official Examiner of Plays. The manuscript contains a number of scenes and lines that were not included in the printed version. The score has not survived.

The opera contains the longest single word in the title of any British musical publication.
