= Bernard Gates =

English composer and singer (1686-1773)

Bernard Gates (23 April 1686 in The Hague – 15 November 1773 in North Aston) was an English composer, and a bass singer employed by Handel in his oratorios. He was director of the choir at Westminster Abbey from 1740 to 1757. Surviving music, in a conservative style, includes six anthems and a morning service.

== Life ==
He was the second son of Bernard Gates, gentleman, of St. Margaret's, Westminster. His name appears in the list of children of the Chapel Royal in 1702. At the end of 1708 he was sworn a gentleman of the Chapel Royal in the place of J. Howell, who died on 15 July in that year. He held the sinecure office of tuner of the regals at court, and was a member of the choir of Westminster Abbey.

At some time before 1732 Gates was made master of the children of the Chapel Royal. On 23 February 1732 Handel's Esther was performed at Gates's house in James Street, Westminster, by the children of the chapel. The same singers sang the work at a subscription concert at the Crown and Anchor Tavern, and again at the room in Villiers Street, York Buildings.

In 1734 Gates seceded from the Academy of Vocal Music, taking the children of the chapel with him. He had been a prominent member of the society from its inauguration. Gates sang one of the airs in the first performance of the "Dettingen Te Deum" in 1743. John Hawkins states that says that Gates introduced into the Chapel the system of solmisation by hexachords.

== Death ==
On 10 March 1737, Mrs. Gates died, and in 1758 Gates moved to North Aston, Oxfordshire. He died there on 15 November 1773, and was buried in the north cloister of Westminster Abbey on the 23rd of the month. The inscription on his monument, a source for his family information, gives his age as eighty-eight. A tablet to his memory was put up in the church of North Aston, at the expense of his pupil, Thomas Sanders Dupuis.

== Family ==
Gates married before 1717, since on 6 June of that year his eldest child, a daughter named Atkinson, was buried in the north cloister of Westminster Abbey. This unusual Christian name, which was borne by another daughter of Gates (buried 1736), was derived from a Mrs. Atkinson, who had been laundress to Queen Anne, and who had brought up Mrs. Gates, and made her Mrs. Atkinson's heiress.
