= Johann Ernst Galliard =

German composer

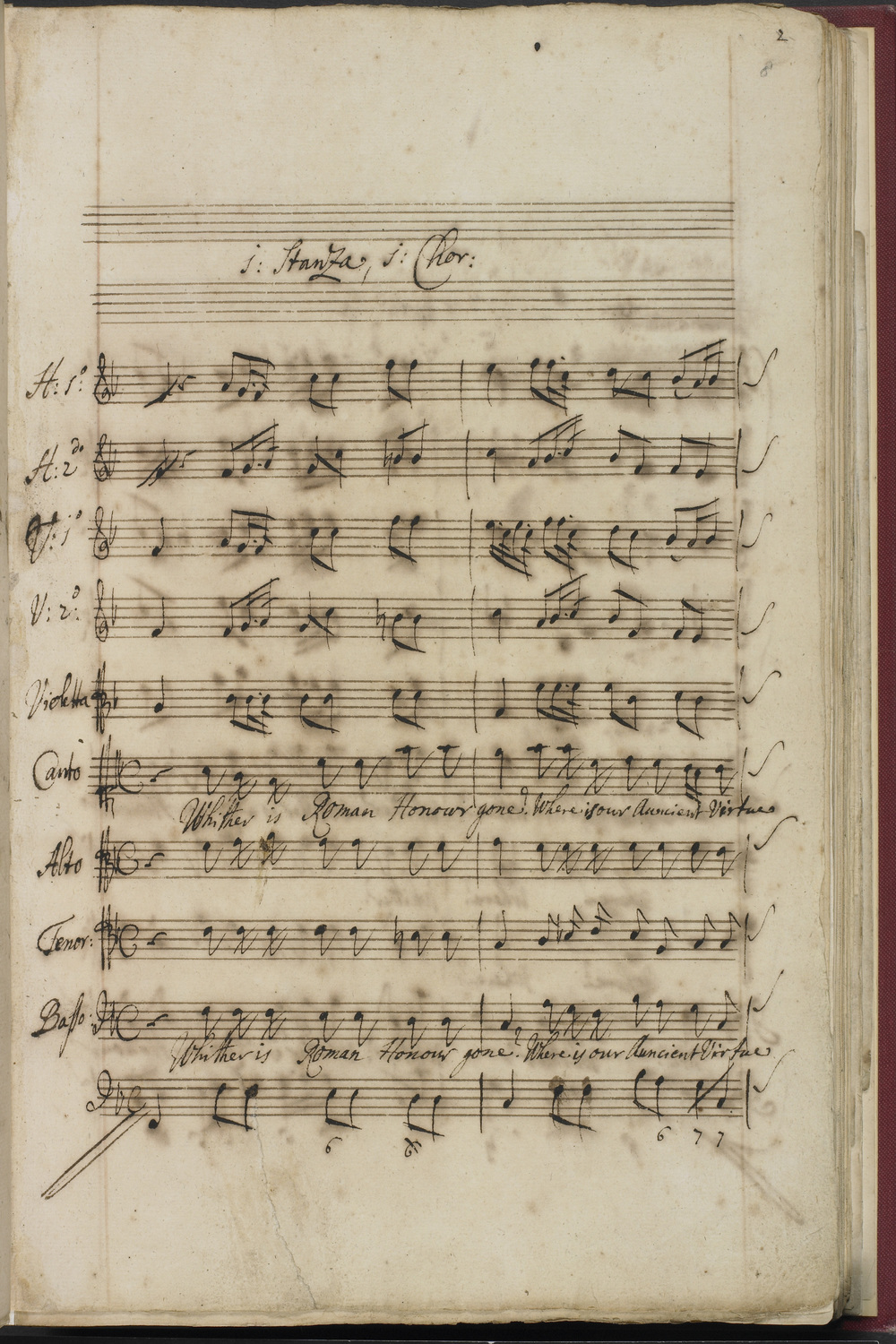
Original manuscript of "Whither is Roman honour gone", a chorus from Julius Caesar (BL Add MS 25484)

Johann Ernst Galliard (?1666/?1687–1747 ) was a composer from the Holy Roman Empire.

Galliard was born in Celle, Holy Roman Empire to a French wig-maker. His first composition instruction began at age 15. Galliard studied composition under Jean-Baptiste Farinel, the director of music at the Court of Hanover, and Abbate Steffani. In addition to his compositional ability, he was also a capable oboe and recorder player. Galliard made a step forward in his musical career when he performed one of his original compositions. This Sonata for oboe and two bassoons debuted at one of Farinel’s concerts. Galliard earned an esteemed seat in the chamber music of George, Prince of Denmark. Later, he moved to England where he became chapel-master of Somerset House. Galliard became a familiar face in high society due to his proximity to and frequenting of the royal residence. In response to war victories, Galliard composed a Te Deum, Jubilate, and three additional anthems.

Bigger and better things seemed promising following his participation in the founding of the Academy of Ancient Music. However, in the kingdom-wide competition for directorial status, Galliard could not match Handel and Bononcini. He wrote the music to the opera Calypso and Telemachus upon the request of a friend, the poet John Hughes. Despite approval from his peers, musical politics caused its failure. As a result, he refocused on his oboe performance and joined Handel’s Italian Opera in 1713 as a soloist. Galliard composed several more cantatas to texts by Hughes and Congreve. He published an opera, music to the Morning Hymn of Adam and Eve taken from John Milton’s Paradise Lost, and a large number of pantomimes which he devised under contract to Rich, the enterprising manager of the Lincoln’s-Inn-Fields Theatre. His published instrumental music includes the following: Six Sonatas for a Flute and a Thorough Bass, Six Solos for the Violoncello, and Six Sonatas for the Bassoon or Violoncello with a Thorough Bass for the Harpsichord.
