= Academy of Ancient Music (1726-1802) =

Group of musicians in London during the 18th century

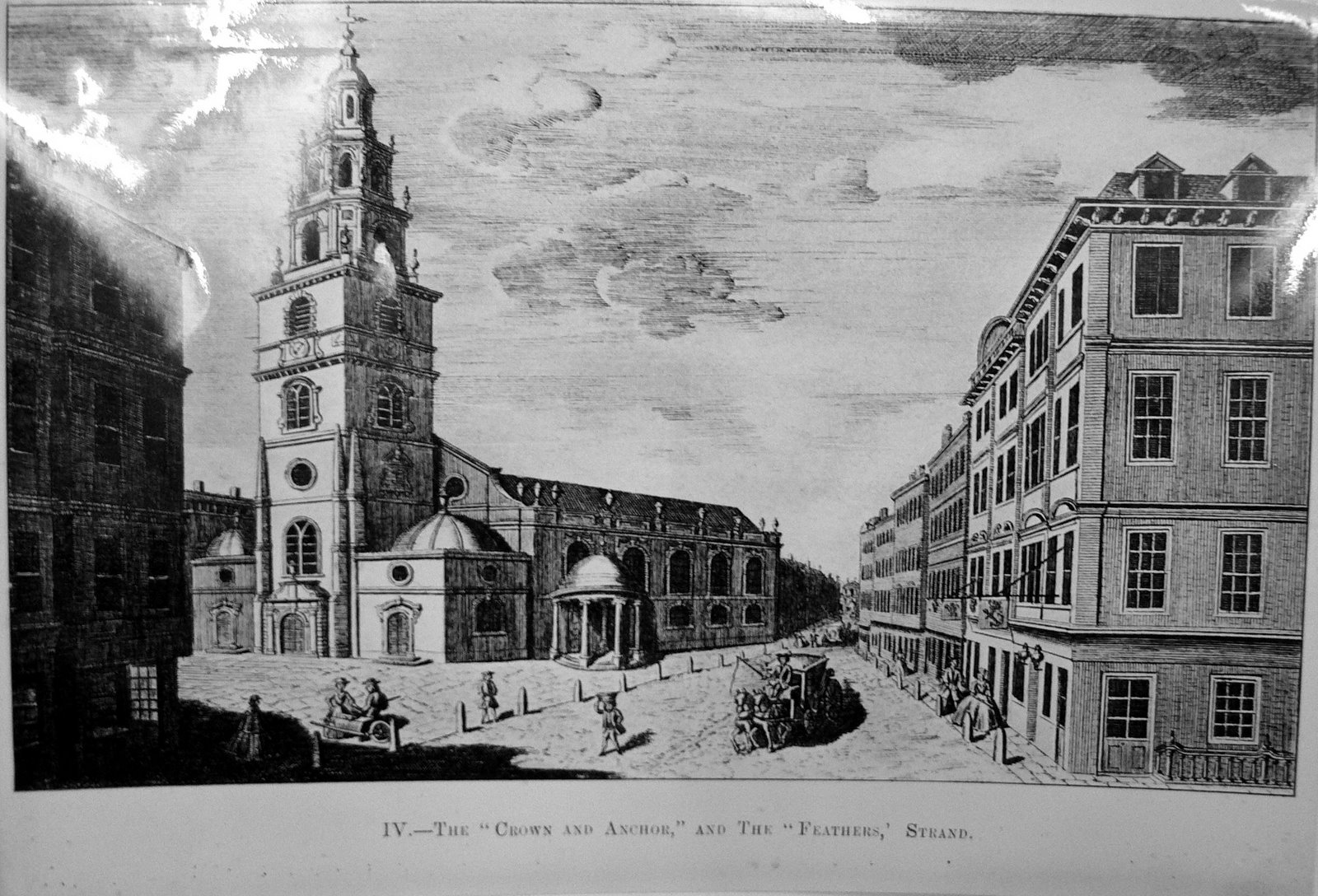
The Crown and Anchor Tavern, seen on the right, home to the Academy of Ancient Music

The Academy of Ancient Music was the name of a group of elite amateur and professional musicians that flourished in London from 1726 until 1802. The group's raison d'être was to study the music of the past through the performance of it. In 1973 a new Academy of Ancient Music was established, also focussed on performing the music of the past.

== Origin ==
The group began life in 1726 as The Academy of Vocal Music, whose membership was restricted to Gentlemen of the Chapel Royal or of ‘the Cathedrals’, and no other persons ‘but such as profess Musick, and shall be approv’d by the Majority’. Among the early participants, in addition to singers from the Chapel Royal and St Paul's Cathedral (and later Westminster Abbey), were a number of eminent names from the worlds of music, politics and fine art, such as:

- the musicians Giovanni Bononcini (1670–1747), Giovanni Stefano Carbonelli (1690/91–1772), Francesco Geminiani (1697–1762), Nicola Haym (1678–1729), Giovanni Battista Sammartini (c.1700–75) and Senesino (1686–1758)
- political figures such as the Earl of Plymouth, Lord Paisley, Viscount Percival (later the First Earl of Egmont), the Earl of Abercorn, and the Modenese diplomat Giuseppe Riva.
- the artist William Hogarth.

The composer and theorist Johann Christoph Pepusch emerged as the musical director. In 1731 the group changed its name to The Academy of Ancient Music.

== Venues ==
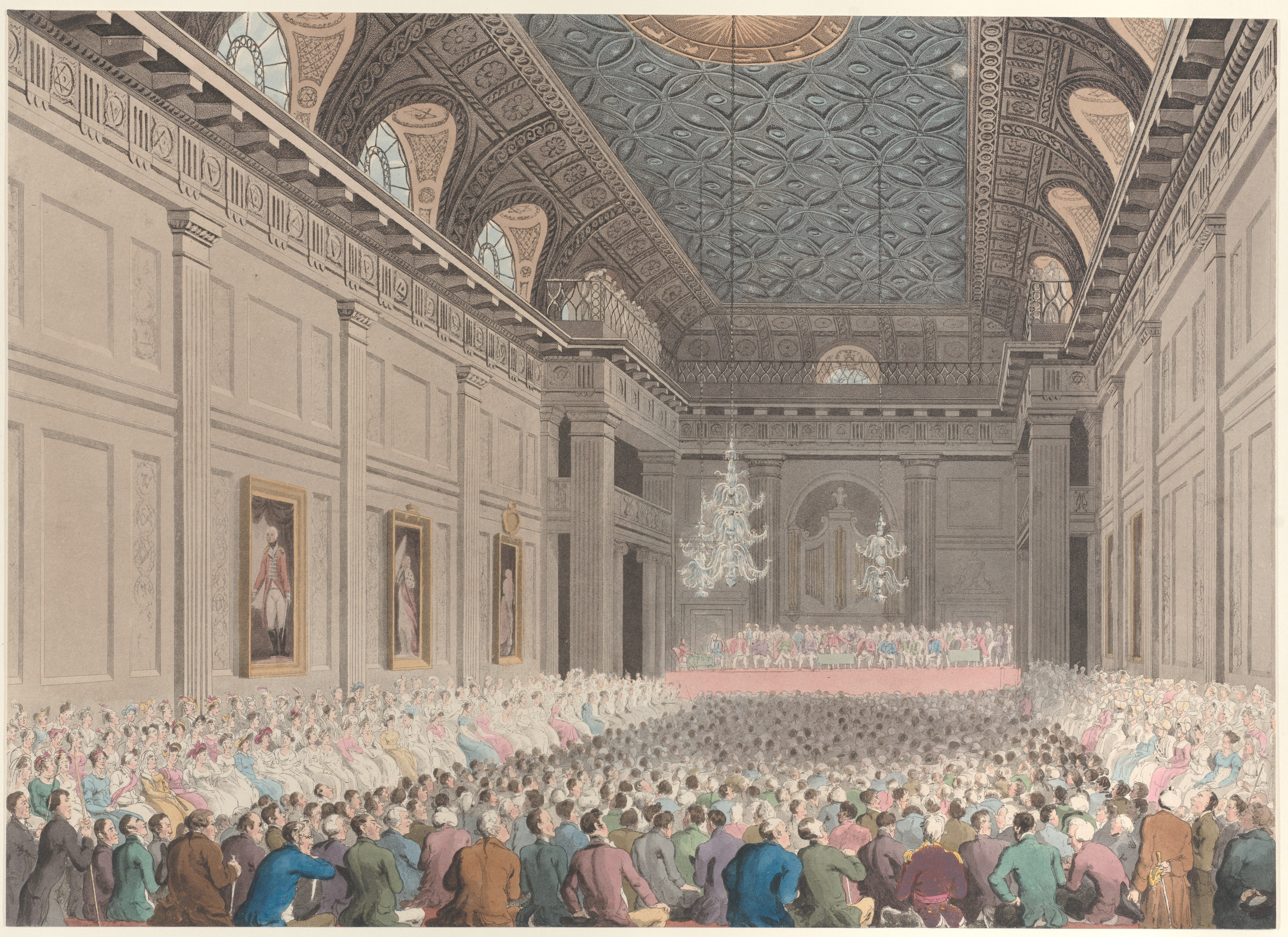
A meeting in Freemasons Hall c.1800

From the outset the academy met at the Crown and Anchor Tavern, Strand, London. Later in the century the academy moved its performances to the newly built, commodious Freemasons Hall in Great Queen Street, Covent Garden. Details of the academy's meetings often appeared in the London press.

== Repertoire ==
The programmes of the academy show a marked preference for the music of pre-Reformation England along with later English works by such as Purcell and Handel, as well as Italian music of the Renaissance and Baroque periods.

== Directors ==
The academy had just three musical directors:

- 1726 - Johann Christoph Pepusch (1667–1752)
- 1752 - Benjamin Cooke (1734–1793)
- 1784 - Samuel Arnold (1740–1802)

== Demise ==
The Academy of Ancient Music began to decline at the closing of the eighteenth century with its last known concert in 1802.
