= Johann Christoph Pepusch =

German composer (1667–1752)

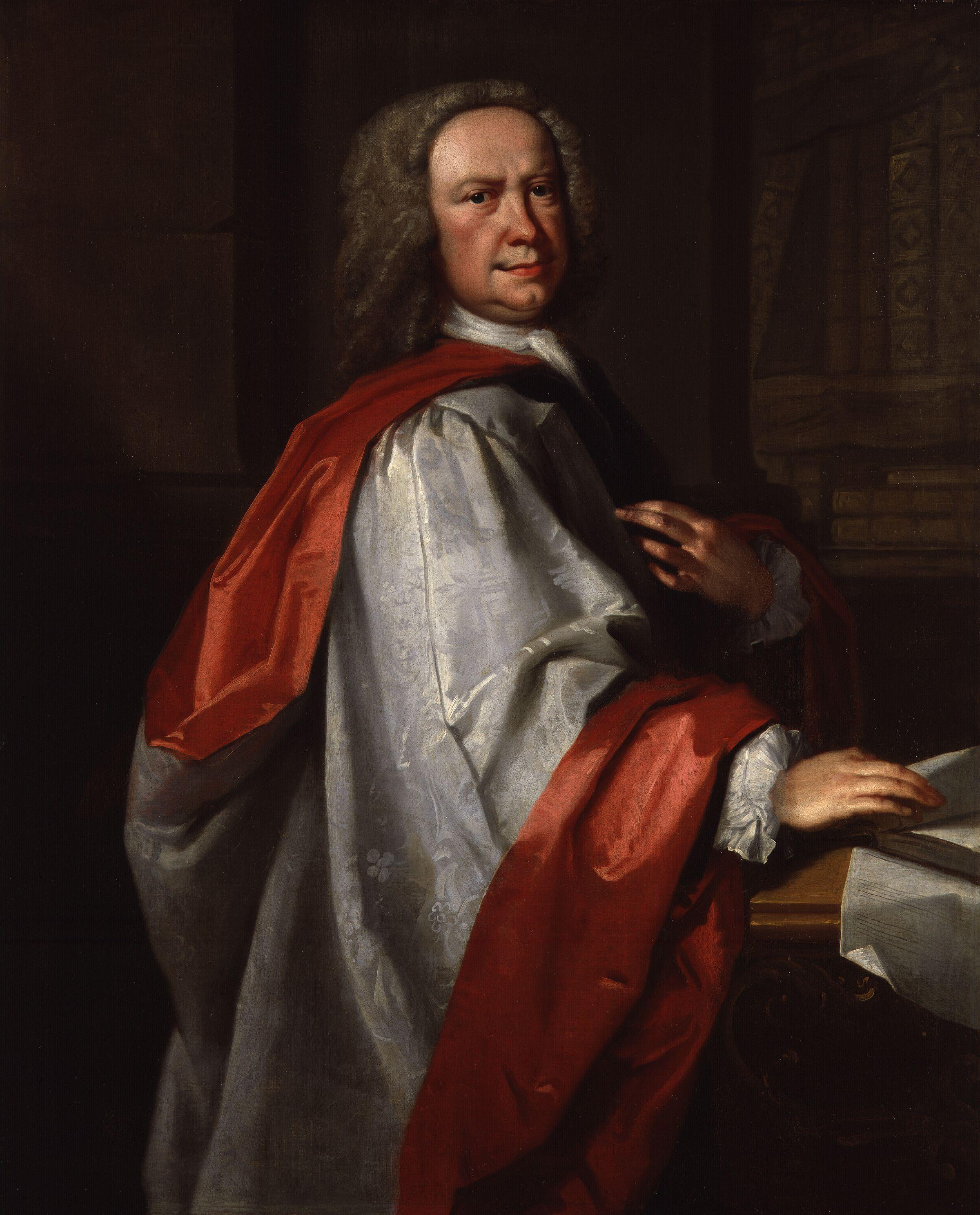
Johann Christoph Pepusch

Johann Christoph Pepusch (German pronunciation: [ˈjoːhan ˈkʁɪstɔf ˈpeːpʊʃ]; 1667 – 31 July [O.S. 20 July] 1752), also known as John Christopher Pepusch (English: /ˈpeɪpʊʃ/) and Dr Pepusch, was a German-born Baroque composer who spent most of his working life in England.

== Early life ==
Pepusch was born in Berlin, son of a Protestant minister. He studied music theory under Martin Klingenberg, cantor of the Marienkirche in Berlin. At the age of 14, he was appointed to the Prussian court where he gave music lessons to the future Frederick William I of Prussia. He resigned this position in 1698 after witnessing the execution of an officer without trial.

He then first went to Amsterdam. In 1704, he settled in England, but continued to publish in Amsterdam until 1718.

== Career ==
At first, Pepusch earned a living playing the viola, then as a theatre director, music theoretician, teacher and organist. In 1726, Pepusch founded The Academy of Vocal Music with others; in around 1730–1, it was renamed The Academy of Ancient Music. In Joseph Doane's Musical directory for the year 1794, the founding of the academy is discussed. On page 76, Doane states:

In the year 1710 (memorable for Handel's first appearance among us) a number of the most eminent composers and performers in London [agreed] to concert a plan of an Academy for the study and practice of Vocal and Instrumental Music, which was no sooner announced than it met the countenance and support of the principal persons of rank. Among the foremost in this undertaking were Mr. John Christopher Pepusch, Mr. John Earnest Galleard, an excellent composer and performer on the Oboe, Mr. Bernard Gates of the Queen's Chapel, Henry Niedler, etc.

— Joseph Doane

He also founded the Madrigal Society. Both were devoted to researching the history of music but specifically music of the Elizabethan period. In 1713 he was awarded the degree of Doctor of Music by the University of Oxford. Pepusch remained Director of the academy until his death in 1752, and had established England as an important location for the study of music history. He was succeeded at the academy by Benjamin Cooke, one of his pupils. His many pupils also included William Boyce and John Bennett.

For a period of twenty years, Pepusch also directed the musical establishment at Cannons, a large stately home at Edgware, Middlesex, northwest of London. He was employed there by James Brydges, 1st Duke of Chandos. For a few years, he worked alongside George Frideric Handel, who had a role described as composer in residence. Both men were at Cannons in 1717/18.

Amongst English musicologists, Pepusch is considered significant foremost for his teaching role, but is best known for his arrangement of the music for The Beggar's Opera (1728) — to the libretto of John Gay. He composed works of all forms, including stage and church music as well as concertos and continuo sonatas. He often made use of popular dance forms, such as the gigue and sarabande.

== Personal life ==
Pepusch was married to Margherita de l'Epine who also performed in some of his theatrical productions. He died in London at the age of 85.
