= Benjamin Cooke =

English composer and organist

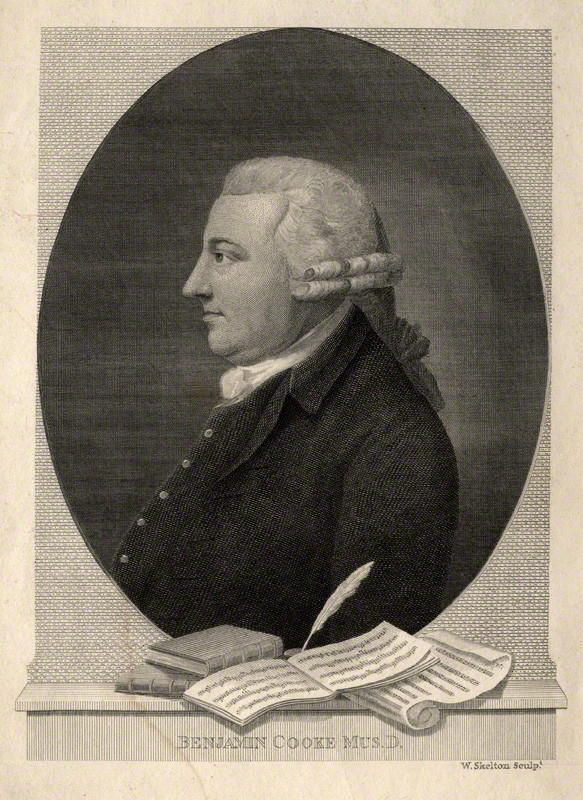
Portrait by William Skelton

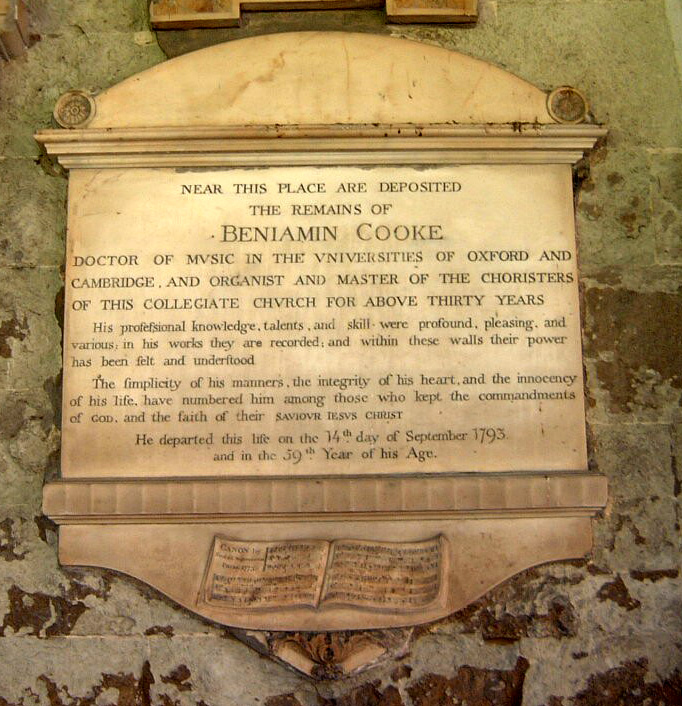
Memorial to Benjamin Cooke in the cloisters of Westminster Abbey

Benjamin Cooke (1734 – 14 September 1793) was an English composer, organist and teacher.

Cooke was born in London and named after his father, also Benjamin Cooke (1695/1705 – 1743), a music publisher based in Covent Garden (active from 1726 to 1743), whose production included a seminal edition of the collected works of Arcangelo Corelli in study scores comprising all five books of sonatas and the twelve concerti grossi.

From the age of nine, Benjamin Cooke the younger was one of four boy sopranos who sang at performances of the Academy of Ancient Music under the Academy's director Johann Christoph Pepusch (1667–1752), who supervised the boys' education. In due course Cooke became the Academy's librarian, and at the death of Pepusch assumed the leadership of the Academy. Many programmes from the period in which he directed the Academy are still extant, showing the range of music he led there. In 1789 the subscribers of the Academy of Ancient Music voted to replace Cooke with Samuel Arnold. Cooke responded to this act with an address to the subscribers in which he protested their action, and in which he lamented the changes the organisation had undergone in the years leading up to the vote.

In later life he received doctoral degrees in music from both Oxford and Cambridge Universities. Like his father before him, he became a member of the Royal Society of Musicians (from 1760).

He was also the organist at Westminster Abbey and master of the Abbey's choristers for over thirty years, as well as being the organist at the church of St Martins in the Fields. He coached Abbey choristers who sang in the premiere performance of Harriet Wainwright's opera Comala in 1792. His Christmas Ode, written in a Handelian style, is one of his relatively few large-scale pieces to have been successfully revived in the modern era. He wrote glees such as In the Merry Month of May, Deh! Dove?, How Sleep the Brave, Hark! the Lark, and In vino veritas. He also composed a variety of church music and organ music. Many of his musical autographs are now owned by the Royal College of Music.

Cooke died on 14 September 1793, probably of a heart attack, and was buried in the west cloister of Westminster Abbey. He was succeeded at the Abbey by Samuel Arnold, while his son Robert Cooke (1768–1814) was appointed organist of St Martin in the Fields. Robert Cooke eventually succeeded Arnold at the Abbey.

Cultural offices
Preceded by John Robinson (1682–1762)	Organist and Master of the Choristers of Westminster Abbey; 1762–1793	Succeeded by Samuel Arnold (1740–1802)
Preceded by Joseph Kelway (1702-1785)	Organist of St Martins in the Fields; 1781–1793	Succeeded by Robert Cooke (1768–1814)
