= Crown and Anchor, Strand =

18th- and 19th-century London pub known for political meetings

Coordinates: 51.5128°N 0.1142°W

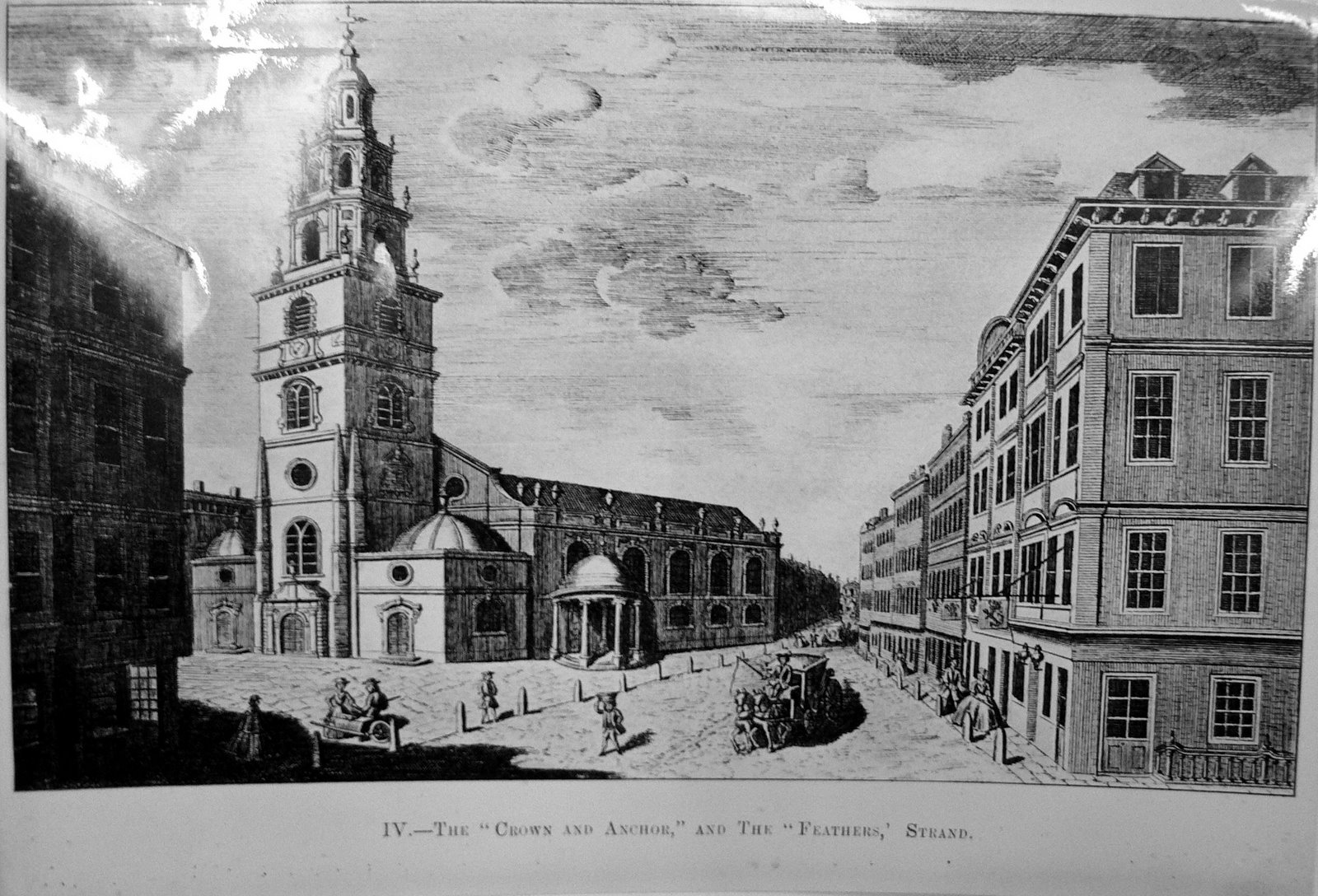
The Crown and Anchor tavern is visible on the right. The Church on the left is St Clement Danes.

The Crown and Anchor, also written Crown & Anchor and earlier known as The Crown, was a public house in Arundel Street, off The Strand in London, England, famous for meetings of political (particularly the early 19th-century Radicals) and various other groups. It is no longer in existence.

The first tavern built on the site sometime before 1710 accommodated the Academy of Vocal Music (1726), renamed (1731) The Academy of Ancient Music), and the Royal Society. George Frideric Handel premiered his first oratorio, Esther, here in 1732, a significant moment in British musical life as it was the first oratorio in English (rather than the usual Italian). Samuel Johnson and James Boswell dined here during the 18th century. A second tavern was built in 1790, and both this and its earlier incarnation may have been called The Crown. Its rooms were large and able to accommodate 2,500 people, leading to its use as a venue for political meetings, particularly by the Radicals, including John Cam Hobhouse and Charles James Fox. One meeting was addressed by the Irish leader and MP in the United Kingdom Parliament, Daniel O'Connell. On 11 November 1823, George Birkbeck made a speech at the Crown and Anchor, attended by over 2000 people including Jeremy Bentham, Hobhouse and Henry Brougham, at which he proposed the foundation of an institution dedicated to educating the working-class inhabitants of London. This meeting led to the foundation of London Mechanics' Institute on 2 December 1823, which would go on to become Birkbeck, University of London.

The Association for Preserving Liberty and Property against Republicans and Levellers, founded by John Reeves in 1792, were known as the Crown and Anchor Society or Association.

During the late 20th century, the site housed offices and a branch of HSBC Bank. It is today a residential development, 190 Strand, incorporating groundfloor retail units.
