= John Edwin (1768–1805) =

English actor

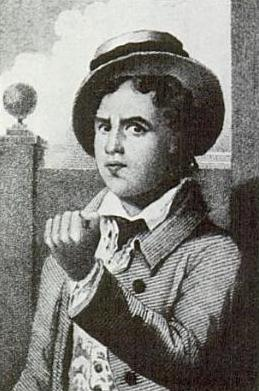
- Born: c. 1768
- Died: 1805 (aged 36–37); Dublin, Ireland
- Resting place: St. Werburgh's Church, Dublin
- Other names: John Edwin the younger
- Occupation: Actor

John Edwin (c. 1768 – 22 February 1805) was an English stage actor, active over the late-18th and early-19th centuries.

== Life and career ==
Known as John Edwin the younger, he was the son of the English actor John Edwin and his long-term partner, Sarah Walmsley. An early mention of Edwin's name comes in a 1777 correspondence between his father and George Colman the Elder in which the elder Edwin offers the theatre manager the use of his wife and son Jack in return for a salary advancement.

On 30 July 1778, Edwin debuted as Hengo at London's Haymarket Theatre in a revival of Bonduca, written by Beaumont and Fletcher. Over his early years, Edwin often appeared with his father at the Haymarket or the Old Orchard Street Theatre in Bath, Somerset.

His first known adult role as Dick in The Apprentice of Murphy, came in a benefit performance for his ailing father at London's Covent Garden Theatre on 26 March 1788.

Edwin later befriended Richard Barry, 7th Earl of Barrymore, and for some years performed in amateur theatre productions staged at a theatre Barry had built near his home in Wargrave, Berkshire.

In 1791, Edwin married actress Elizabeth Rebecca Richards, the daughter of actor William Talbot Richards (died 1813). Edwin soon brought his bride to Wargrave, where her extended stay eventually caused friction between his wife and Tate Wilkinson, manager of the York circuit.

On 20 June 1792, the two appeared together at the Haymarket in The Virgin Unmasked taken from An Old Man Taught Wisdom. The play was a ballad farce written by Henry Fielding in which Edwin played Blister to his wife's Lucy.

Edwin escorted his wife to Dublin and Doncaster in 1794, and traveled with her on most of her provincial tours over the remainder of their marriage.

== Death ==
Edwin drank himself to death one night in Dublin on 22 February 1805 after a satirical poem, ascribed to John Wilson Croker, called Edwin, the "lubbard spouse of Mrs. Edwin", and "the degenerate son of a man 'high on the rolls of comic fame".

A tombstone, erected by Elizabeth Rebecca Edwin in St. Werburgh's churchyard, Dublin, attributes her husband's death to the acuteness of his sensibility.

Edwin was best known at Bath, where he was held in some parts equal or superior to his father, he was an excellent country actor, and would probably, but for his irregular life, have made a high reputation. Tate Wilkinson praises his Lenitive in "The Prize" and his Nipperkin in "The Sprigs of Laurel," and says that as Mr. Tag in "The Spoil'd Child" he is better than any comedian he (Wilkinson) has hitherto seen. He adds that Mr. Edwin dresses his characters better and more characteristic than any comic actor I recollect on the York stage' (Wandering Patentee, iv. 204). Dictionary of National Biography, 1908.

== See also ==
- List of British actors
- List of English people
