= Elizabeth Rebecca Edwin =

Anglo-Irish stage actress

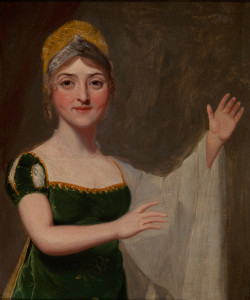
- Born: c. 1771; Dublin
- Died: 3 August 1854; Chelsea
- Occupation: actor
- Spouse: John Edwin the younger

Elizabeth Rebecca Edwin (c. 1771–1854) was an Anglo-Irish stage actress active in Ireland and England during the late eighteenth and early nineteenth centuries.

== Life ==
Elizabeth Rebecca Edwin was the daughter of actor William Talbot Richards (d. 1813), who at the time of her birth in Dublin had been engaged with her mother at the Crow Street Theatre. Her mother's name and fate is unknown; when Edwin was around eight her father married twenty-one-year-old Sarah Edmonds in London.

At Crow Street Theatre, when eight years old, she appeared in Prince Arthur and other juvenile characters, including a part written specially for her by O'Keefe in his lost and forgotten farce, The Female Club. She also, for her benefit, played Priscilla Tomboy in The Romp, an abridged version of Bickerstaffe's Love in the City. She left the stage for a time to be educated. After playing in the country she appeared at Covent Garden Theatre 13 November 1789, as Miss Richards from Margate, in The Citizen of Arthur Murphy.

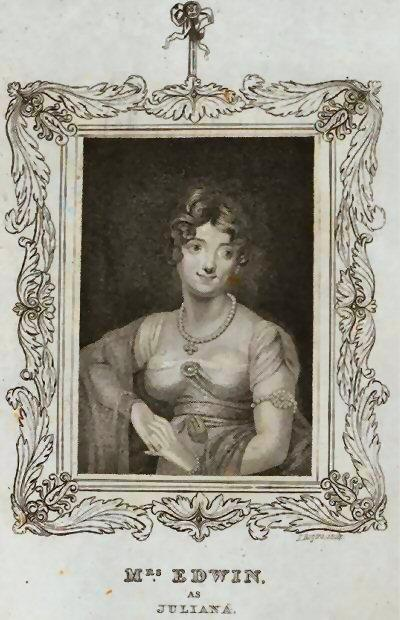
Elizabeth Rebecca Edwin NYPL Digital Gallery

The following year she joined at Hull the company of Tate Wilkinson, playing with great success in comedy. In the line of parts taken by Mrs. Jordan, Wilkinson declares her the 'very best' he has seen, surpassing her predecessor in youth and grace. 'Her face,' he says, 'is more than pretty, it is handsome and strong featured, not unlike Bellamy's; her person is rather short, but take her altogether she is a nice little woman'. She married John Edwin the younger and she joined with her husband the mixed company of actors and amateurs assembled by the Earl of Barrymore at Wargrave. She appeared with her husband at the Haymarket Theatre, 20 June 1792, as Lucy in An Old Man taught Wisdom. Subsequently, she passed to the private theatre in Fishamble Street, Dublin, opened by Lord Westmeath and Frederick Jones.

In October 1794 she had rejoined Tate Wilkinson, appearing in Doncaster with her husband. With him she visited Cheltenham, and 14 October 1797, still in his company, made, as Mrs. Edwin from Dublin, her first appearance in Bath, playing Amanthis and Roxalana. Here, in Bristol, or in Southampton, where she became a special favourite, she took the leading characters in comedy and farce. In 1805, while in Dublin, she lost her husband to suicide. She ascribed his death to his sensibility on the memorial stone she commissioned. Her husband had been a talented comic actor but his reputation was lost in his wife's fame and he had drunk himself to death following a cruel poem that cast his as the 'lubbard spouse' of Mrs Edwin.

Edwin was engaged for Drury Lane, but before she reached the theatre, it burnt down, and on 14 October 1809, she appeared as Widow Cheerly in The Soldier's Daughter, with the Drury Lane company at the Lyceum. The chief characters in comedy were assigned to her, and 3 February 1810 she was the original Lady Traffic in Riches, or the Wife and Brother, extracted by Sir James Bland Burgess from Massinger's City Madam.

At Drury Lane she remained for some years. She was selected to recite, 3 July 1815, the verses of the manager Arnold in commemoration of Waterloo. She then returned to Dublin, to the Crow Street Theatre, and, engaged by Robert William Elliston, appeared, 16 November 1818, at the Olympic Theatre, speaking an opening address by Moncrieff. The following year she accompanied her manager to Drury Lane. Mrs. Edwin was also seen at the Haymarket, Adelphi, Surrey, and other West End theatres, and played at Scarborough, Weymouth and Cheltenham. At a comparatively early age she had earned enough to retired from the stage. She lost part of her savings to a dishonest stockbroker who absconded to America with between eight and nine thousand pounds of her savings. This compelled her to return again to acting.

On 13 March 1821 she played at Drury Lane the Duenna in Sheridan's comic opera, as "her first appearance in a character of that description". With rare candour she owned herself too old for the part in which she was accustomed to appear. She appeared at Drury Lane the following season. For very many years she lived in retirement, and, all but forgotten, died at her lodgings in Chelsea 3 August 1854. She had the reputation of delivering an address or epilogue with especial grace and fervour.

She was below the middle height, fair, and with expressive features. Careful in money matters, she barely escaped the charge of parsimoniousness. Portraits of her by Samuel De Wilde as Eliza in Riches and Albina Mandeville in The Will are in the Mathews collection at the Garrick Club.
