= Samuel Arnold (composer) =

English composer and organist (1740–1802)

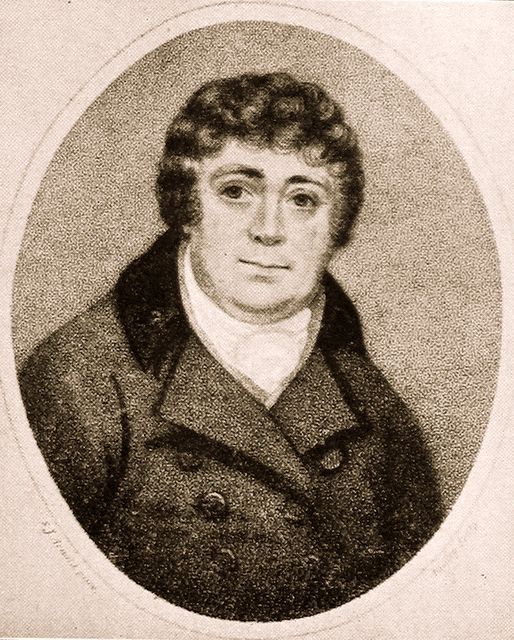
- Born: 10 August 1740; London, England
- Died: 22 October 1802 (aged 62)
- Resting place: Westminster Abbey
- Occupations: Composer, organist
- Notable work: Writing the earliest version of Humpty Dumpty; Abimelech; The Baron Kinkvervankotsdorsprakingatchdern; Inkle and Yarico
- Father: Thomas Arnold

Samuel Arnold (10 August 1740 – 22 October 1802) was an English composer and organist.

Arnold was born in London (his mother is said to have been Princess Amelia; his father was Thomas Arnold). He began writing music for the theatre in about the year 1764. A few years later, he became the director of music at Marylebone Gardens, for which he wrote much of his popular music. In 1777, he worked for George Colman the Elder at the Little Theatre, Haymarket. In 1783, he became organist at the Chapel Royal and in 1793 he became the organist at Westminster Abbey, where he was eventually buried. He also wrote the earliest version of Humpty Dumpty. He was a close friend and associate of Haydn.

== Works ==
Arnold's best-known works include:

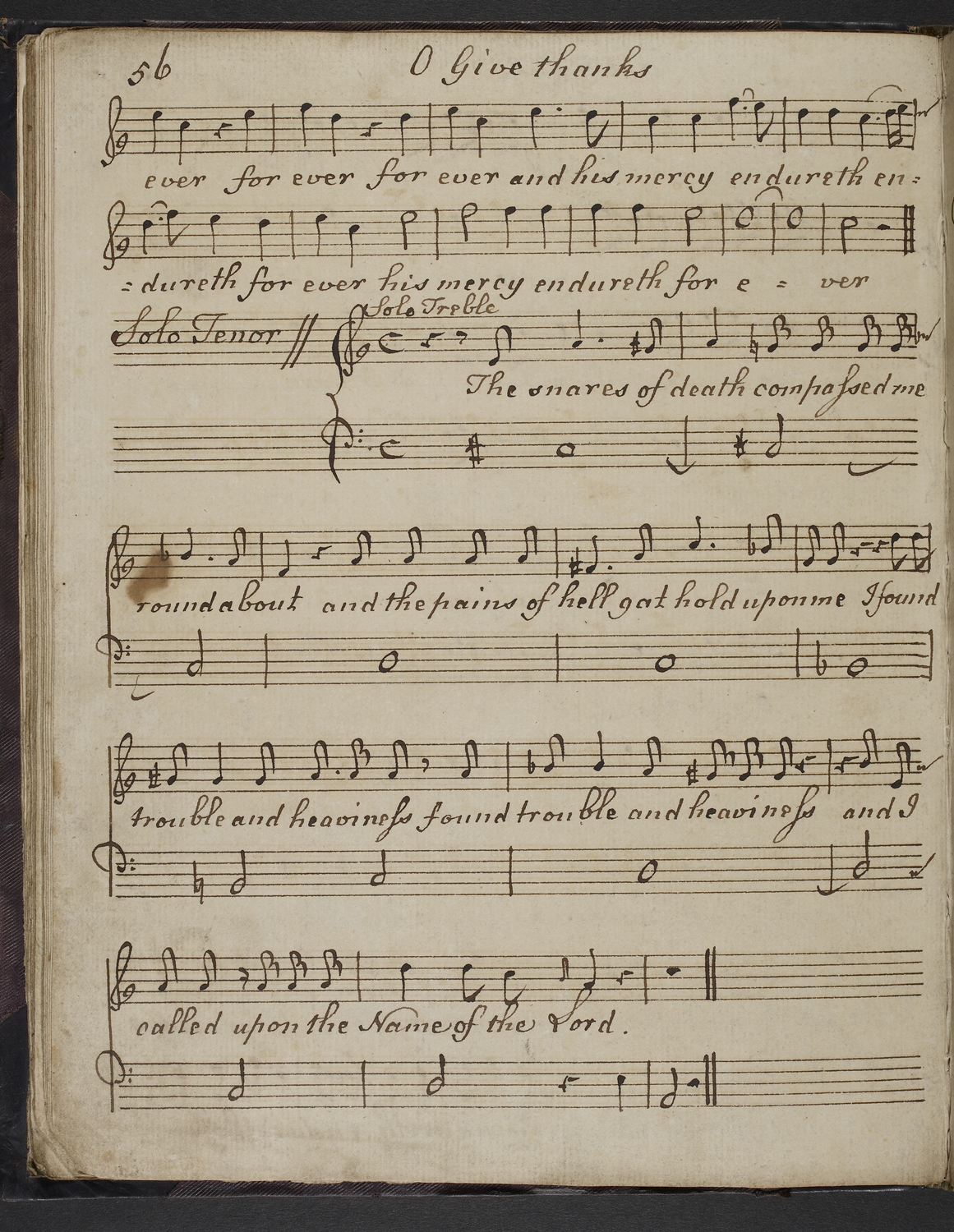
"O Give Thanks" in the hand of Thomas Barrow

- The Maid of the Mill (1765)
- Abimelech (1768)
- The Prodigal Son (1773)
- Incidental music for Macbeth (1778)
- The Baron Kinkvervankotsdorsprakingatchdern (1781)
- The Castle of Andalusia (1782)
- Two to One (1784), libretto George Colman. Includes the song "Pensive I Mourn".
- Turk and No Turk (1785)
- Inkle and Yarico (1787)
- Juvenile Amusements (1797)

He is also known for producing the first collected edition of the works of George Frideric Handel between 1787 and 1797, published in 180 parts. This was the most comprehensive collection of Handel's music prior to the appearance of the Händel-Gesellschaft edition in the next century.

== Bibliography ==
- Panton, Kenneth J. (2011). Historical Dictionary of the British Monarchy. Scarebrow Press, Inc. ISBN 978-0-8108-5779-7.

Cultural offices
Preceded by James Nares	First Organist of the Chapel Royal; 1783–1802	Succeeded by John Stafford Smith
Cultural offices
Preceded by Benjamin Cooke	Organist and Master of the Choristers of Westminster Abbey; 1793–1802	Succeeded by Robert Cooke
