= Giovanni Stefano Carbonelli =

Italo-British composer

Giovanni Stefano Carbonelli (c. 9 March 1690/1691, Livorno, Grand Duchy of Tuscany – 1772, London), after 1734 Anglicised to John Stephen Carbonell, was an Italian-born British composer and violinist, who later abandoned his musical career to become a vintner under royal patronage.

== Life ==
Giovanni Stefano Carbonelli was born in the Italian port city of Livorno to Pietro Carboneu (alternatively Carboneo or Carbonell) and Teresa Cocchi. His year of birth is uncertain, with dates varying from 1690/1691 to 1699/1700. His father was a Frenchman who had immigrated from Aix-en-Provence, Province of Provence, while his mother was a local Leghorner. Not much is known of his early musical education; he was reputedly a pupil of Arcangelo Corelli, although there is little documentary evidence to support this. In 1711 and 1712, he was one of the violinists in the local ensemble during the celebrations of the Feast of Santa Croce in Lucca (13–14 September); on these occasions his name was recorded as "Gio: Stefano Carbonèo".

In 1716–1717 he lived in Venice, where he became acquainted with Antonio Vivaldi. Carbonelli participated in Vivaldi's operatic productions, playing in the accompanying orchestra; Vivaldi in return dedicated one of his violin concertos (RV 366) to Carbonelli.

In 1719, Carbonelli was invited to Britain by his patron John Manners, the Marquess of Granby (later the 3rd Duke of Rutland), who was a director of the then newly-formed Royal Academy of Music. This marked a turning point in the composer's life - henceforth he was to spend the rest of his days in England. For several years, Carbonelli was conductor of the Drury Lane Theatre orchestra. He was additionally the principal violinist of Handel's operatic orchestra at the Theatre Royal, Haymarket. Carbonelli was in great demand as a freelance violinist, and played actively until at least 1762.

On 27 February 1734 (Old Style), he became a naturalised British subject, registering his name as "John Stephen Carbonell, Son of Peter Carbonell, by Teresia, his wife, born at Leghorn". He had earlier converted to Anglicanism and married in 1730.

From the 1740s onwards, Carbonelli increasingly turned his attention from music to the more profitable trade in continental wines. He eventually became a full-time vintner, and was granted a royal warrant as an official purveyor of wines to the King in 1759. His descendants continued to manage the wine business highly successfully for several generations.

Carbonelli died in London in 1772.

== Music ==
Carbonelli is remembered for a single set of 12 sonatas da camera for violin and basso continuo – his only surviving work. First published privately in 1729, they were dedicated to his main benefactor, the 3rd Duke of Rutland. Virtuosic in scope, these sonatas reveal a solid mastery of harmony and counterpoint, and include double-stopped and fugal passages. Their relative neglect until quite recently may be attributable to the somewhat grudging approval of them by the music historian Charles Burney, as well as the lack of any other surviving works by the composer.

== Works ==
- 12 Sonate da Camera a Violino o Violone e Cembalo (John Walsh, London)
