= Giovanni Buonaventura Viviani =

17th-century Italian composer and violinist

Giovanni Buonaventura Viviani (15 July 1638 Florence –about 1693 Pistoia) was an Italian composer and violinist. He worked in the court at Innsbruck as a violinist at least between 1656 and 1660. Between 1672 and 1676 he was director of the court music at Innsbruck, which, after the extinction of the Tyrolean Habsburgs, had come under the control of the emperor. Although in publications of 1678 Viviani still described himself as holding this position, it seems more likely that he was in fact in Venice working on his arrangement of Francesco Cavalli’s Scipione affricano and his own opera Astiage, which were both performed in Venice that year. Also that year, Viviani directed an oratorio at the Oratorio di San Marcello in Rome with Arcangelo Corelli and Bernardo Pasquini. He was probably elevated to the nobility in the same year, since he subsequently designated himself ‘Nobile del Sacro Romano Imperio’. Between 1678 and 1679 and 1681 and 1682 he was in Naples as director of a troupe of opera singers, and while he was there he performed some of his own operas and oratorios. In 1686 he was maestro di cappella to the Prince of Bisignano. From January 1687 to December 1692 he was maestro di cappella of Pistoia Cathedral.

As a composer Viviani is known mostly for his operas and solo cantatas which follow the style of Antonio Cesti. It is speculated that Viviani studied with Cesti during his Innsbruck years which accounts for the similarities in style between the two composers; in any case he certainly knew Cesti’s work. His instrumental works are predominantly in the Italian style, though south German and Austrian influences are also recognizable. Of particular interest are the instrumental recitatives of the Sinfonia cantabile in his op. 4, which is written in imitation of a solo cantata; there are also two sonatas in op. 4 for trumpet and continuo. The Solfeggiamenti, textless vocal pieces intended for teaching purposes, are unusual examples of this genre because of the number of their movements and their exceptional length. His other compositions include two sonatas for trumpet and organ, two sonatas for solo trumpet, sonatas for violin and continuo, and several Capriccios.

== Selected works ==
=== Operas ===
- Astiage (Naples, December 1682)
- Scipione affricano (Venice, carnival 1678) [revision of Cavalli’s 1664 opera]
- Zenobia (Napoles, 1678) [now lost]
- Le fatiche d'Ercole per Dejanire (Naples, 1679)
- Mitilene, regina delle Amazoni (Naples, 13 Nov 1681)
- L’Elidoro, o vero Il fingere per regnare (Saponara, 15 June 1686)
- La vaghezza del fato (possibly performed in Vienna)

=== Oratorios ===
- La strage degli innocenti (Naples, 1682)
- L’Esequie del Redentore (Naples, 1682)
- Le nozze di Tobia (Florence, 1692)
- L’Abramo in Egitto
- Faraone

=== Instrumental music ===
- Capricci armonici da chiesa e da camera, Op. 4 (Venice, 1678)

== Sources ==
- Herbert Seifert. The New Grove Dictionary of Opera, edited by Stanley Sadie (1992). ISBN 0-333-73432-7 and ISBN 1-56159-228-5
