= Matthew Dubourg =

Composer and musician

- Born: 1703; London
- Died: 5 July 1767; London
- Resting place: Paddington Cemetery, London
- Occupation: Musician/composer
- Known for: orchestral leader in the premiere performance of Handel's Messiah
- Title: Chief Composer and Master of the Music in Ireland
- Spouse: Frances
- Children: Elizabeth
- Parent(s): Isaacs, a famous dancer of the London stage and court

Matthew Dubourg (1703 – 3 July 1767) was an English violinist, conductor, and composer who spent most of his life in Ireland. Among other achievements, Dubourg led the orchestra at the premiere of Georg Friedrich Handel's great oratorio Messiah.

== Biography ==
Dubourg was born in London, the illegitimate son of a court dancing master, his mother's identity is unknown. In 1712, at age 9, he performed a Corelli sonata standing on a stool at the home of Thomas Britton. At age 11, in 1714, he furthered his studies under the celebrated Italian violinist, composer and music theorist Francesco Geminiani. He performed a sonata at the Queen's Theatre in March 1714, a benefit concert in May at Hickford's Room, as well as many other performances during the London season.

On 17 June 1727 he married Frances, the daughter of musician Bernard Gates at Stanmore, Middlesex. They had one child, a daughter named Elizabeth, who married oboist Redmond Simpson on 22 September 1753, who had one child.

Dubourg served as concert-master from 1728 to 1764 in Dublin. His official title was "Chief Composer and Master of the Music attending His Majesty's State in Ireland" at Dublin Castle. He was a major force the musical life of Dublin, together with Geminiani, who was his friend and teacher for many years.

In April 1730, Dubourg (styled as "Mathew Dubourgh, Gentleman") was involved in a property dealing with 'Francis Barry, Senior, wife of Richard Barry late of the City of Dublin, Gentleman', whereby in consideration of the sum of £110, Barry assigned unto Dubourg the dwelling house of a tailor named George Quay situated on Capel Street in Dublin. The deed was witnessed by a woman named Elen: Du Bourg (sic) of the City of Dublin, Spinster, possibly a relative of Dubourg's. Four years later, a Deed of Mortgage or Conveyance was registered between the same Frances Barry (noted as the Widow & Relict of Richard Barry of the City of Dublin, Gent) and Dubourg. The deed recorded that £460 had been paid by Dubourg to Barry concerning separate plots of ground in Capel Street and Arbour Hill, Dublin. The deed was witnessed by "Peter Gunan of the said City (of Dublin), Instrument Maker", who is known to have tuned and maintained the organ at Trinity College Chapel during the 1700s.

Dubourg was close friends with Handel, and followed the rise of his career in London, as well as the general music scene there from across the Irish Sea. Around 15 May 1736, Benjamin Victor, theatre manager in London, wrote to Dubourg in Dublin concerning the upcoming marriage of Frederick, Prince of Wales to Princess Augusta of Saxe-Gotha an event at which Handel saw a chance to gain Royal Patronage: "...As to the Operas, they must tumble, for the King's presence could hardly hold them up, and even that prop is denied them, for his Majesty will not admit his royal ears to be tickled this season. As to music, it flourishes in this place more than ever, in subscription concerts and private parties, which must prejudice all operas and public entertainments".

== Handel's Messiah ==
Dubourg led the orchestra in the first performances of Handel's Messiah. Dubourg had worked with Handel as early as 1719 in London. The premiere of Messiah took place at "Mr Neale's Music Hall" in Dublin on 13 April 1742.

Permission to use members of the choirs from Dublin's cathedrals had been granted by the dean of Saint Patrick's Cathedral, Jonathan Swift (1667–1745) (who is better known today as the author of Gulliver's Travels). However, Swift then withdrew his permission, only to grant it once again as the dates for the performances drew near. Swift also had no kind words for Dubourg's orchestra. He called them "a club of fiddlers in Fishamble Street".

Handel led the performance of Messiah from the harpsichord, and Dubourg conducted the orchestra. Despite Swift's sally against Dubourg's orchestra, Handel thought they played quite well, writing to Charles Jennens, "as for the Instruments they are really excellent, Mr. Dubourgh being at the Head of them, and the Musick sounds delightfully in this charming Room".

According to Dubourg's son-in-law, the oboist Redmond Simpson, Handel was "attacked by another Paraletic stroke" while dining with Dubourg one evening in Dublin. "It was violent and universal" but luckily "Doctors Barry and Quin, & Mr Nichols, Surgeon General, were present... By violent bleeding & other evacuations he was soon perfectly recovered, & never had any return of it".

Of a concert in 1742 conducted by Handel, the following anecdote was told: Dubourg played a cadenza in which he wandered far from the theme creating complex modulations of it. When he finally returned to the original theme, Handel said: "Welcome home, Monsieur Dubourg".

Following the premiere of Messiah Dubourg travelled to London with Handel and performed several other works with him at Covent Garden, including Samson, L'Allegro ed il Penseroso, and the London premiere of the Messiah in 1743. He returned to Dublin in October.

== Works ==
Dubourg wrote several works, which are still frequently played, particularly in Britain. One of his passions was to take famous Irish tunes and morph them in the late Baroque style as, for example, with his Variations of Druid Tunes. His variations of the sonatas (op. 5) of Arcangelo Corelli are also often heard.

== Later life and death ==
In 1752, Dubourg became Master of the Royal Chapel in London, a post he occupied until his death in 1767. Upon Handel's death in 1759, money was left to Dubourg in his will. On 3 July 1767 Dubourg made a brief will leaving most of his estate to his wife Frances, and he died shortly thereafter. There is some question on the date of death, but his registered date of death is 5 July 1767. The inscription on his tombstone reads:

"Here lyeth the body of Matthew Dubourg, chief composer and master of music in the kingdom of Ireland, servant to four generations of the illustrious House of Hanover, George I. and II., his Royal Highness the late Prince of Wales, and His present Majesty; as also instructor in Music to their Royal Highnesses the Duke of Cumberland and the late Prince Frederick. He died July 5, 1767, aged 64."

Tho' sweet Orpheus thou couds't

Bring

Soft pleadings from the trembling string

Unmov'd the King of Terror stands,

Nor owns the magic of thy hands

== Sources ==
- Entry on Dubourg in the French Wikipedia
- Notes on Handel's Messiah by Jeffrey Thomas, Music Director of the American Bach Soloists
