= Ercole Gaibara =

Italian Baroque composer (c. 1620–1690)

- Born: c. 1620; Italy
- Died: 1690 (aged 69–70); Italy
- Occupations: Violinist, music teacher, composer
- Era: Baroque music

Ercole Gaibara (c. 1620 – 1690) was an Italian Baroque composer, music teacher, and violinist.

== Biography ==
Ercole Gaibara was active in Bologna during the first half of the 17th century. There is very little information about his life except that he was a very renowned violinist, earning the nickname "del Violino" by his students. He succeeded Alfonso Pagani as the violinist of the Concerto Palatino.

The musicologist Marc Pincherle considers him the founder of the École Bolonaise de violon (Bolognese School of Violin), where he taught Arcangelo Corelli, Giuseppe Torelli, Giovanni Benvenuti, Bartolomeo Laurenti and Leonardo Brugnoli. He may have also taught Alessandro Stradella.

== Bibliography ==
- Bolognese Instrumental Music, 1660-1710, Gregory Richard Barnett, Ashgate Publishing, 2008
