= Jean-Baptiste Senaillé =

French Baroque composer and violin virtuoso (1687-1730)

Jean Baptiste Senaillé (23 November 1687 – 15 October 1730) was a French Baroque composer and violin virtuoso.

== Biography ==
His father Jean Senaillé was a member of Les Vingt-quatre Violons du Roi from September 1, 1687 to 1713. According to Fetis., Senaillé first studied under two members of the Les Vingt-Quatre Violons, a Queversin (or Querversin) and a Bonnefons (probably François Marillet de Bonnefons) and then Jean-Baptiste Anet and Giovanni Antonio Piani (known in France as Jean-Antoine Desplanes), who stayed in Paris from 1704, where he was in the service of Louis-Alexandre de Bourbon. Senaillé soon started composing, and published his first book of sonatas in 1710, dedicated to Paul Étienne Brunet (1653-1717), treasurer general of the King's household.

In 1716 or 1717, Jean-Baptiste Senaillé went to Italy to perfect his art. He made a name for himself in Modena, and was invited, perhaps by Tomaso Antonio Vitali, to play in his orchestra for a season. He was probably also noticed by Charlotte Aglaé d'Orléans, Duchess of Modena, and on his return to Paris in 1719 he was attached to the private service of the Duke of Orléans, regent of the kingdom and father of Charlotte Aglaé d'Orléans. He was heard at the Concert Spirituel. During his lifetime he published five books of ten violin sonatas (in 1710, 1712, 1716, 1721 and 1727) Fétis underlines that he sometimes imitated Arcangelo Corelli's opus 5. He imported Italian musical features into the French court.

Senaillé was replaced at the Twenty-Four by François Francœur on 22 October 1730.

Lionel de La Laurencie devotes several pages to Senaillé, and analyzes his works.

He is best known for a fast 2/4 movement from the Sonata No.4 in D minor (10 Violin Sonatas, Op.4), Allegro spiritoso, which has been transcribed for a wide variety of instruments, from cello to bassoon to euphonium. Some of these transcriptions were edited by Robin De Smet.

== Selected recordings ==
- Premier Livre de Sonates à violon seul avec la Basse continue, Odile Édouard, violin, Freddy Eichelberger, harpsichord, Emmanuel Jacques, cello & violin bass (K617 2004)
- Sonata in E minor op.4 n°5, Sonata in G minor op.1 n°6, Sonata in D major op.3 n°10, Sonata in C minor op.1 n°5, Théotime Langlois de Swarte, violin, William Christie harpsichord. CD Harmonia Mundi 2021. Choc Classica
