= Pietro Castrucci =

Italian violinist and composer (1679–1762)

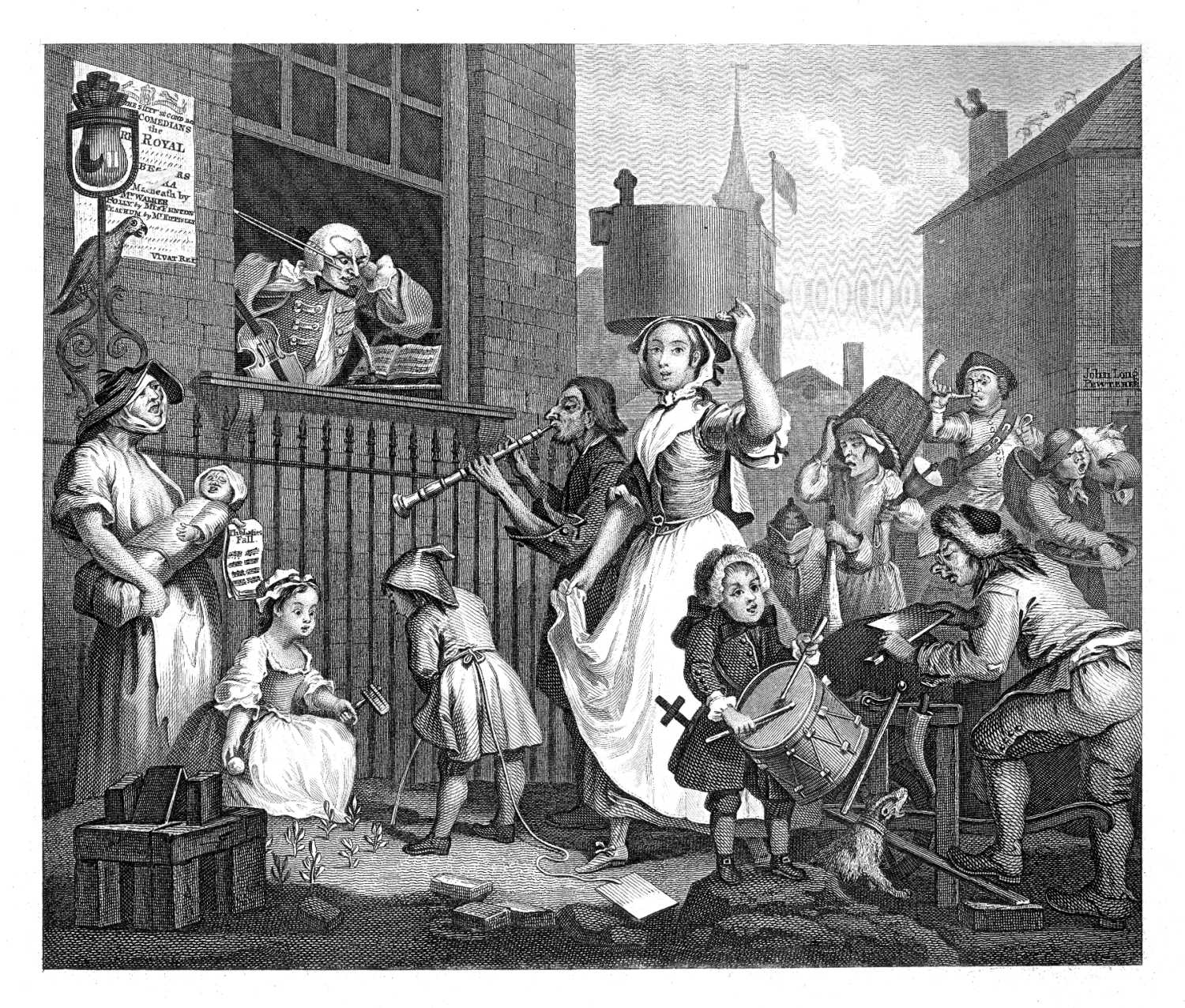
William Hogarth, 1741: "The Enraged Musician", sometimes identified as a caricature of Pietro Castrucci.

Pietro Castrucci (1679 – 7 March 1752) was an Italian violinist and composer.

Castrucci was born in Rome, where he studied with Arcangelo Corelli; in 1715, he settled in London, where he became known as one of the finest virtuoso violinists of his generation. By 1718, he had become leader of the opera orchestra of George Frideric Handel, a position which he held until 1737, when he was succeeded by the younger John Clegg. In 1739, he became one of the first beneficiaries of the Royal Society of Musicians and was little heard of thereafter, apart from an erroneous report of his death in 1746.

After a benefit concert in Dublin in 1750, he died there of malaria in 1752. Despite being by then a pauper, he was buried with full ceremony in St. Mary's Church, Dublin.

Castrucci was the inventor of the 'violetta marina', which was a variation of the viola d'amore. Handel wrote obbligati for this instrument.

== Works ==
- Sonate a Violino e Basso continuo, Op. 1
- Sonate a Violino e Basso continuo, Op. 2
- 12 Concerti grossi, Op. 3
- 12 Sonate a Flauto traverso o Violino o Hautbois e Basso continuo, 1731, published together with Francesco Geminiani
