= Carlo Mannelli =

Italian violinist, castrato and composer

Carlo Mannelli (4 November 1640 in Rome – 6 January 1697 in Rome) was an Italian violinist, castrato and composer.

== Life ==
Mannelli spent the major part of his life in Rome where he also worked during the opera performances and religious events. As a violinist nicknamed Carlo del Violino and Carluccio di Pamfilio, he played the first violin in the most famous Roman musical ensemble of the period. Arcangelo Corelli, who often played under Mannelli and who gradually replaced him between 1682 and 1690 as the first concertino violinist, described him as one of his most influential teachers. Additionally, he counted him with Carlo Ambrogio Lonati and Lelio Colista among the "più valorosi professori musici di Roma", as cited in the preface of his Opus 1.

For several years, he was leader of the Congregazione dei musici di S. Cecilia. When he died unmarried, in 1697, he left his not negligible assets to the congregation. The donation was provided for members with lesser income and it ran out only towards the end of the 18th century.

== Works ==
Except one of his Sinfonie a violino solo (c. 1666), which survived in manuscript, and also two printed collections op.2 and op.3, his other works are considered missing. 300 works are known in his estate, including 86 violin sonatas, 24 trio sonatas, 58 sinfonias for 3 violins and basso continuo and a few vocal works. Also there exist references to a work Studio del Violino, which is, however, also missing.

== List of selected works ==
- Primo Libro de Sinfonie con violino e Basso continuo
- Sonate e tre, due violini con il basso per l'organo Op. 2 (Rome 1682)
- Sonata a tre, due violini con il basso per l'organo Op. 3 (Rome 1692)
