= John Clegg (violinist) =

Irish violinist (born 1714)

John Clegg (born 1714; died in or after 1746) was an Irish violinist who became one of the most celebrated soloists of his time in both Dublin and London. He was a student of both Matthew Dubourg and Giovanni Bononcini. A child prodigy, Clegg appeared in London starting in 1723, playing a concerto by Antonio Vivaldi. In the following year, he played Vivaldi's La tempesta di mare, RV 253, at the New Theater in the Haymarket. In 1737 he was chosen by the composer George Frideric Handel to succeed the Italian violinist Pietro Castrucci as leader of his opera orchestra in London. In 1744 Clegg's career was cut short by mental illness due to excessive zeal in study and practice. He was admitted twice to Bedlam Hospital, discharged in 1746 and died soon afterwards, probably in London.
