= Dietrich Becker =

German violinist and composer (c.1623–1679)

Dietrich Becker (ca. 1623 – Hamburg, 12 May 1679) was a German Baroque violinist and composer.

Little is known about Becker's musical education. His first position was as organist at Ahrensberg. In his second position, in the service of the Chapelle Ducale (Ducal Chapel) of the Duke Christian-Ludwig at Celle, he mainly devoted himself to the violin. In 1662 he settled in Hamburg as a violinist in the service of the Conseil de la Ville (City Council) and in 1667 he was named Maître de Chapelle (Chapel Master).

In 1668 Becker dedicated a collection of pieces entitled Musikalischen Frühlingsfrüchte (Musical Spring Fruit) to the mayor and members of the City Council. This collection consisted of chamber sonatas and suites for 3 to 5 voices with basso continuo. In 1674, his Zweystimmigen Sonaten und Suiten (Sonatas and Suites for Two Voices) was published.

Becker's chamber music was among the most significant instrumental music coming from Germany during this time.

== Sources ==
- Dietrich Becker article in French Wikipedia
- Dietrich Becker article in German Wikipedia
