= Piancastelli =

Piancastelli is an Italian surname. Notable people with the surname include:

- Erika Piancastelli (born 1996), Italian–American softball player
- Giovanni Piancastelli (1845–1926), Italian painter
- Márcio Piancastelli (1936–2015), Brazilian-Italian Automobile designer
- Mariangela Piancastelli (born 1953), Italian basketball player
- Maria Novella Piancastelli, Italian physicist
- Romano Piancastelli (born 1940), Italian cyclist
