= Cristiano Farinelli =

Italian composer and violinist

- Occupations: composer; violinist
- Partner(s): George Frideric Handel, Arcangelo Corelli

Cristiano Farinelli (17th century) was an Italian composer and violinist. Cristiano Farinelli was a friend of the composer Arcangelo Corelli and is said by some musicologists to have been the uncle and perhaps patron of the famous castrato Carlo Broschi whose stage name was Farinelli.

== Life ==
Date and place of his birth and death are unknown. He after lived for some time in France. He also worked in Italy while Handel was there. According to Chrysander, he was in the Elector's service in 1714, and, on the latter's accession to the English throne, composed a cantata on the words, "Lord, remember me when thou comest in Thy kingdom". He appears to have enjoyed a great reputation as a performer, and considerable popularity as a composer of instrumental music in a light and pleasing style. He excelled especially in the performance of Lulli's airs and his own so-called Follia, which was known in England during the 18th century as "Farinell's (Note: D'Urfey wrote his song "Joy to Great Caesar" in honour to Charles II in 'divisions' of his bass; it must be, therefore, composed before 1685.) ground". Farinelli was ennobled by the King of Denmark, and, according to Hawkins, was appointed by George I as his resident at Venice.
