= Charles de Saint-Évremond =

French soldier, hedonist, essayist and literary critic

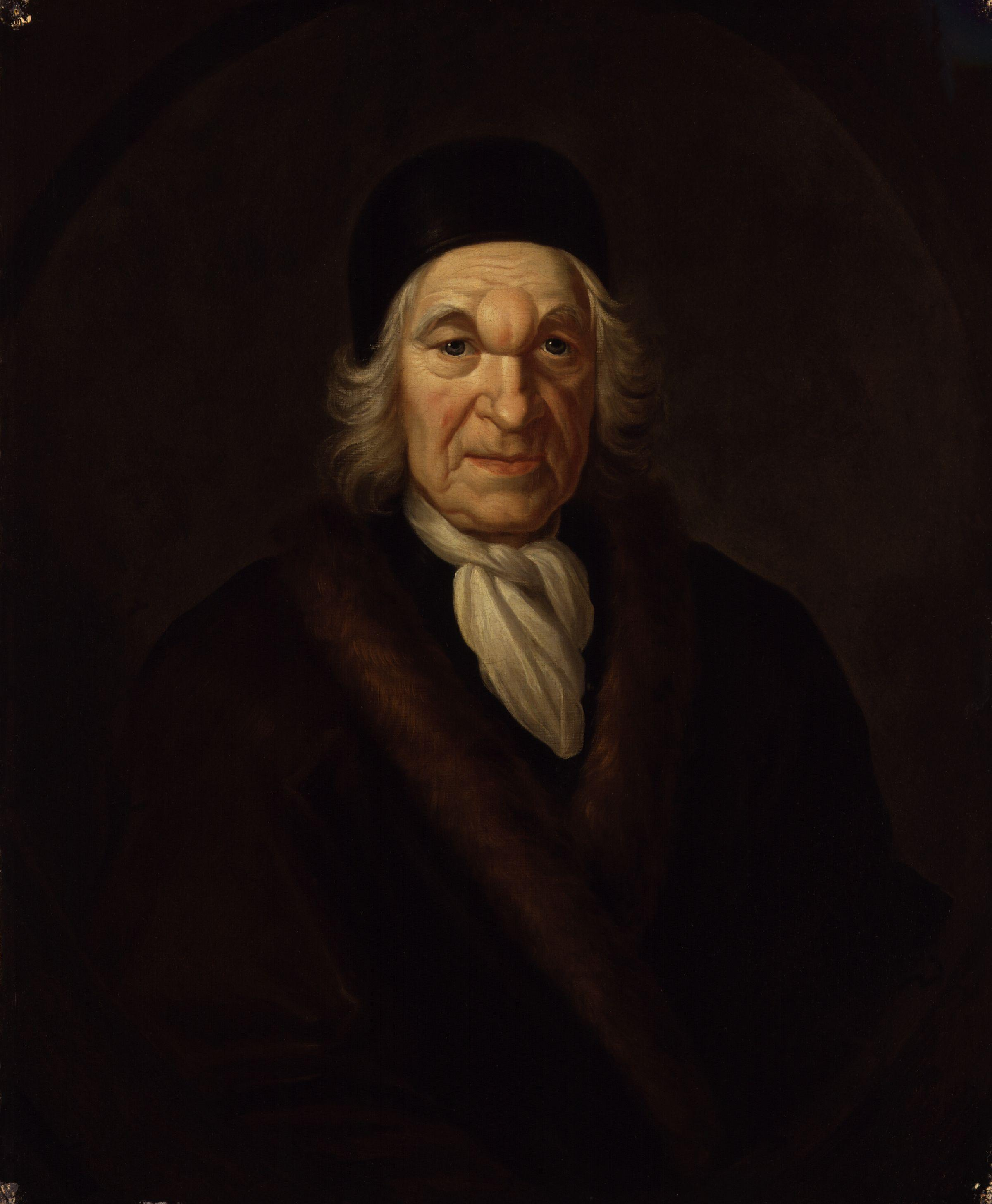
- Portrait of Charles de Saint-Évremond by Jacques Parmentier, circa 1701
- Born: 1 April 1613; Saint-Denis-le-Guast, near Coutances, in Normandy, France
- Died: 9 September 1703 (aged 90); London, England
- Occupations: Essayist, critic, soldier

Charles de Marguetel de Saint-Denis, seigneur de Saint-Évremond (1 April 1613 – 9 September 1703) was a French soldier, hedonist, essayist and literary critic. After 1661, he lived in exile, mainly in England, as a consequence of his attack on French policy at the time of the Peace of the Pyrenees (1659). He is one of the few foreigners to be buried in Poets' Corner, Westminster Abbey. He wrote for his friends and did not intend his work to be published, although a few of his pieces were leaked in his lifetime. The first full collection of his works was published in London in 1705, after his death.

== Life ==
He was born at Saint-Denis-le-Gast, near Coutances, the seat of his family in Normandy. He was a pupil of the Jesuits at the Collège de Clermont (now the prestigious Lycée Louis-le-Grand), Paris; then a student at Caen. For a time he studied law in Paris at the College d'Harcourt (now Lycée Saint-Louis). He soon, however, took to arms, and in 1629 went with Marshal Bassompierre to Italy. He served through a great part of the Thirty Years' War, distinguishing himself at the siege of Landrecies (1637), when he was made captain. During his campaigns he studied the works of Montaigne and the Spanish and Italian languages.

In 1639 he met Pierre Gassendi in Paris, and became one of his disciples. He was present at the battles of Rocroi, Nördlingen, and at Lerida. For a time he was personally attached to Condé, but offended him by a satirical remark and was deprived of his command in the prince's guards in 1648. During the Fronde, Saint-Évremond was a steady royalist. The Duke of Candale, of whom Saint-Évremond has left a very severe portrait, gave him a command in Guienne after he had reached the grade of maréchal de camp, and he is said to have pocketed 50,000 livres in less than three years from this office. He was one of the numerous victims involved in the fall of Fouquet in 1661. His letter to Marshal Créquy on the Treaty of the Pyrenees, which is said to have been discovered by Colbert's agents at the seizure of Fouquet's papers, seems a very inadequate cause for his disgrace.

Saint-Évremond fled to the Netherlands and to England, where he was kindly received by Charles II and was pensioned. After James II's flight to France, Saint-Évremond was invited to return, but he declined. Hortense Mancini, the most attractive of Cardinal Mazarin's group of attractive nieces, came to England in 1670, and set up a salon for flirtation, gambling, and witty conversation, and here Saint-Évremond was for many years at home. He died aged ninety on 9 September 1703 and was buried in Westminster Abbey, where his monument is in Poets' Corner, close to that of Prior.

== Literary work ==
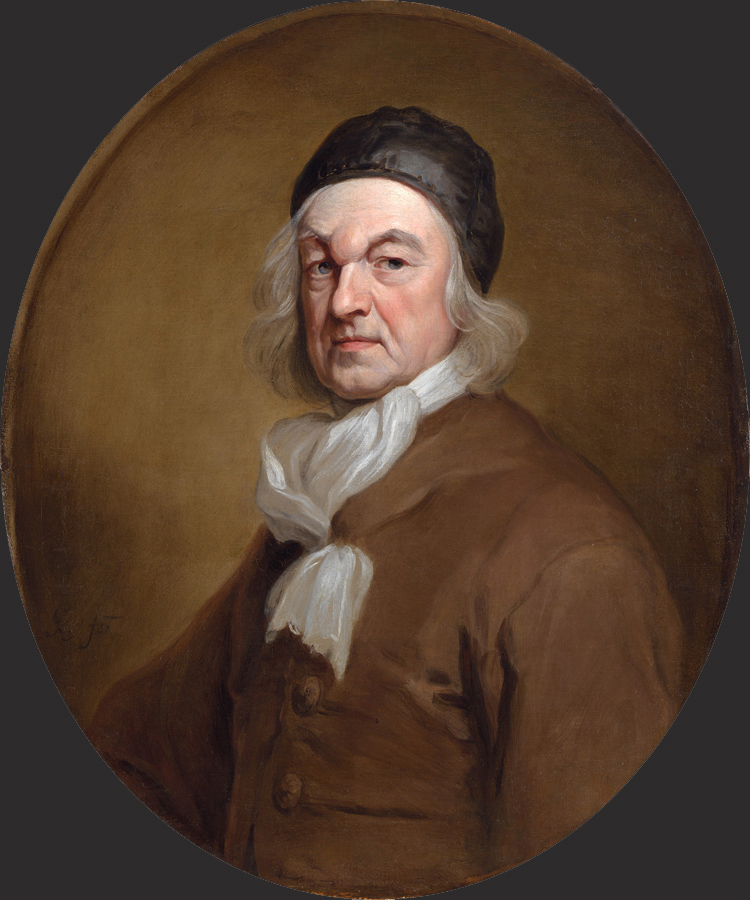
Portrait of Charles de Saint-Évremond by Godfrey Kneller. c. 1680s

Saint-Évremond never authorised the printing of any of his works during his lifetime, though Barbin in 1668 published an unauthorised collection but he empowered Pierre des Maizeaux to publish his works after his death, and they were published in London (2 volumes, 1705), and often reprinted. His masterpiece in irony is the so-called Conversation du maréchal d'Hocquincourt avec le père Canaye (the latter a Jesuit and Saint-Évremond's master at school), which has been frequently classed with the Lettres provinciales.

His Œuvres meslées, edited from the manuscripts by Silvestre and Maizeaux, were printed by Jacob Tonson (London, 1705, 2 volumes; 2nd edition, 3 volumes, 1709), with a notice by Maizeaux. His correspondence with Ninon de l'Enclos, whose fast friend he was, was published in 1752; La Comédie des académistes, written in 1643, was printed in 1650. Modern editions of his works are by Hippeau (Paris, 1852), C. Giraud (Paris, 1865), and a selection (1881) with a notice by M. de Lescure. Among his plays is one called Politick Would-be, modelled on a character from Ben Jonson's Volpone.

== Partial bibliography ==
- Œuvres mêlées (1643–1692),
- Les Académistes (1650)
- Retraite de M. le duc de Longueville en Normandie
- Lettre au marquis de Créqui sur la paix des Pyrénées (1659)
- Conversation du maréchal d’Hocquincourt avec le Père Canaye
- Réflexions sur les divers génies du peuple romain (1663)
- Seconde partie des œuvres meslées (1668),
- Sur nos comédies
- De quelques livres espagnols, italiens et français
- Réflexions sur la tragédie ancienne et moderne
- Défense de quelques pièces de Corneille
- Parallèle de M. le Prince et de M. de Turenne
- Discours sur Épicure
- Pensées sur l’honnêteté
- Considérations sur Hannibal
- Jugement sur Tacite et Salluste
- L’idée de la femme qui ne se trouve point
- Jugement sur les sciences où peut s’appliquer un honnête homme
- Dissertation sur la tragédie d’Alexandre
- Fragment d’une lettre écrite de La Haye
- De la seconde guerre punique
- De l’éloquence, tirée de Pétrone
- La matrone d’Éphèse

== Publications ==
- Les Opéra, Éd. Robert Finch et Eugène Joliat, Genève, Droz, 1979.
- Œuvres en prose, Éd. René Ternois, Paris, Didier, 1962.
- La Comédie des académistes, Éd. Louis d'Espinay Ételan, Paolo Carile et al., Paris, Nizet, 1976.
- Entretiens sur toutes choses, Éd. David Bensoussan, Paris, Desjonquères, 1998. ISBN 2-84321-010-0
- Écrits philosophiques, Éd. Jean-Pierre Jackson, Paris, Alive, 1996. ISBN 2-911737-01-6
- Réflexions sur les divers génies du peuple romain dans les divers temps de la république, Napoli, Jovene, 1982.
- Conversations et autres écrits philosophiques, Paris, Aveline, 1926.
- Lettres, Éd. intro. René Ternois, Paris, Didier, 1967.
- Maximes et œuvres diverses, Paris, Éditions du Monde Moderne, 1900–1965.
- Pensées d’Épicure précédées d'un Essai sur la morale d’Épicure, Paris, Payot 1900.
