= Twelve Violin Sonatas, Op. 5 (Corelli) =

Set of sonatas composed by Arcangelo Corelli

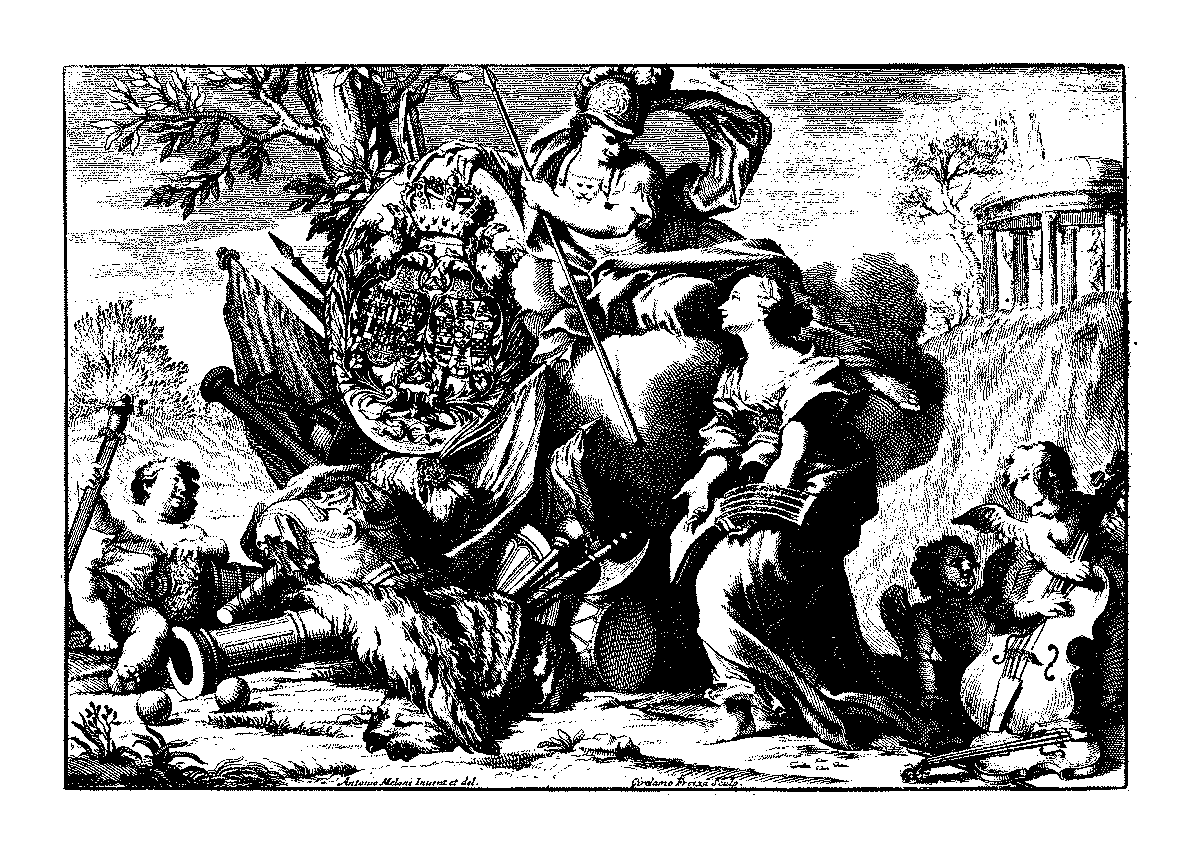
Cover of the first edition of Twelve Violin Sonatas, Op. 5, by Giovanni Girolamo Frezza

Twelve Violin Sonatas, Op. 5 (Sonate a violino e violone o cimbalo) is a collection of 12 violin sonatas by Arcangelo Corelli, first published on 1 January 1700. The first edition is dedicated to Sophia Charlotte, Electress of Brandenburg. The first six are sonate da chiesa and the last six are sonate da camera. The last sonata, No. 12, is a set of 23 variations on the theme La Folia.

The title in the first edition. Sonate a violino e violone o cimbalo, calls for a violin, accompanied by a bass violin or harpsichord. The basso continuo part was written in the figured bass notation. There have been different arrangements in performance, ranging from organ, to archlute, to cello.

== Influence ==
Sir John Barbirolli arranged the Preludio, Allemanda, Gavotte and Giga of No. 10, and Sarabande of No. 7 into an Oboe Concerto, dedicated to his wife, the oboist Evelyn Rothwell.

Peter Welsh arranged the Sonata No. 5 in G minor for Koto and Danso in 2002. The arrangement was performed the same year in Kuala Lumpur with great critical acclaim.

== Selected discography ==
- Andrew Manze (violin) and Richard Egarr (harpsichord) – Harmonia Mundi HMU907298/99
- Lina Tur Bonet (violin) and Musica Alchemica – Pan Classics PC10375
- Arthur Grumiaux (violin) and Riccardo Castogne (harpsichord) – Philips
- Locatelli Trio – Hyperion

=== Reviews of recordings ===
- BBC Record Review: Review by Anna French on BBC Radio 3, 5 May 2018
- Review on recording by Manze and Egarr
