= Scipione affricano =

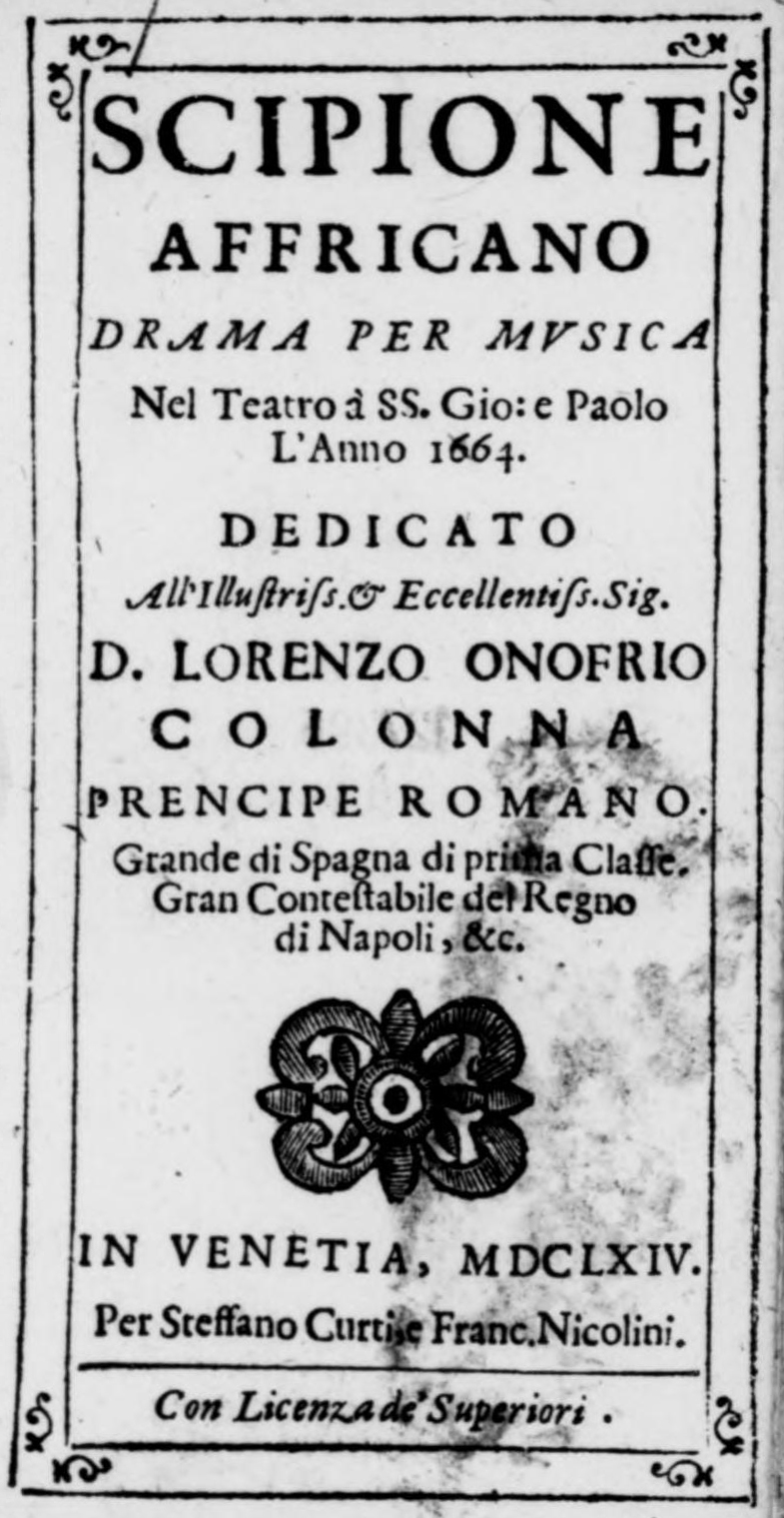
Title page of the original libretto

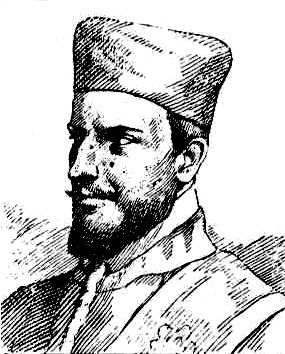
Francesco Cavalli

Scipione affricano (Scipio Africanus) is an opera in a prologue and three acts by Francesco Cavalli. It was designated as a dramma per musica. The Italian libretto was by Nicolò Minato, based on Livy's "The Continence of Scipio".

== Performance history ==
It was first performed in Venice at the Teatro SS. Giovanni e Paolo on 9 February 1664. It was also given in Rome in 1671 with the castrato Giovanni Francesco Grossi as a celebrated Siface. Giovanni Buonaventura Viviani produced a greatly revised version of the opera for the Carnival of Venice in 1678.

== Roles ==
Roles, voice types, premiere cast
Role	Voice type	Premiere cast, 9 February 1664
Asdrubale	tenor	
Ericlea	soprano	
Luceio	soprano	
Polinio	soprano	
Siface	alto castrato	Giovanni Francesco Grossi
Massanissa	bass	
Sofonisba	soprano	

== Recordings ==
- Atto III Scena 3: "A tuo dispetto amor" Cappella Mediterranea, Leonardo García Alarcón, Clematis, Thomas Dunford 2014
- "Hora si ch'assai più fiero" Filippo Mineccia (counter-tenor) Nereydas Javier Ulises Illán Glossa 2018
