= Queen's Head Tavern =

Former pub on Fleet Street in London, England

Coordinates: 51.5139°N 0.1116°W

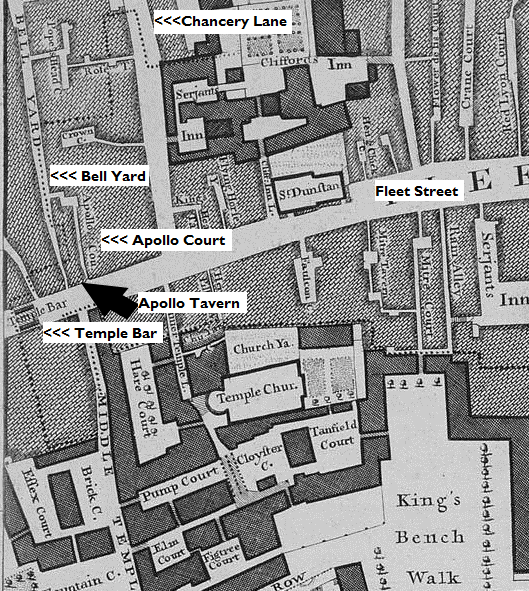
Apollo Court, Fleet Street, as shown on John Rocque's Map of London, 1746

The Queen's Head Tavern (later the Apollo Tavern) was located on Fleet Street to the east of the Temple Bar in London. It was already established in 1682 when it is mentioned in the diary of Narcissus Luttrell: "The 2nd, in the morning early, a fire broke out in the back part of the Queen's Head Tavern, by Temple Bar".

Perhaps its most notable clientele were the members of a masonic music club that met there between 1725 and 1727, known as Philo-musicae et -architecturae societas Apollini; their musical director was the Italian composer and violinist Francesco Geminiani.

The club's minute-book, now in the British Library, reveals that during its residency at the tavern, the landlord Thomas Oliverson (d.1731) agreed to change the name of the tavern to Apollo, and a new tavern sign was painted by James Parmentier, a member of the club.

The area of the tavern can be seen on John Rocque's Map of London, 1746, however the name of the tavern seems to have disappeared from the record by the end of the eighteenth century.

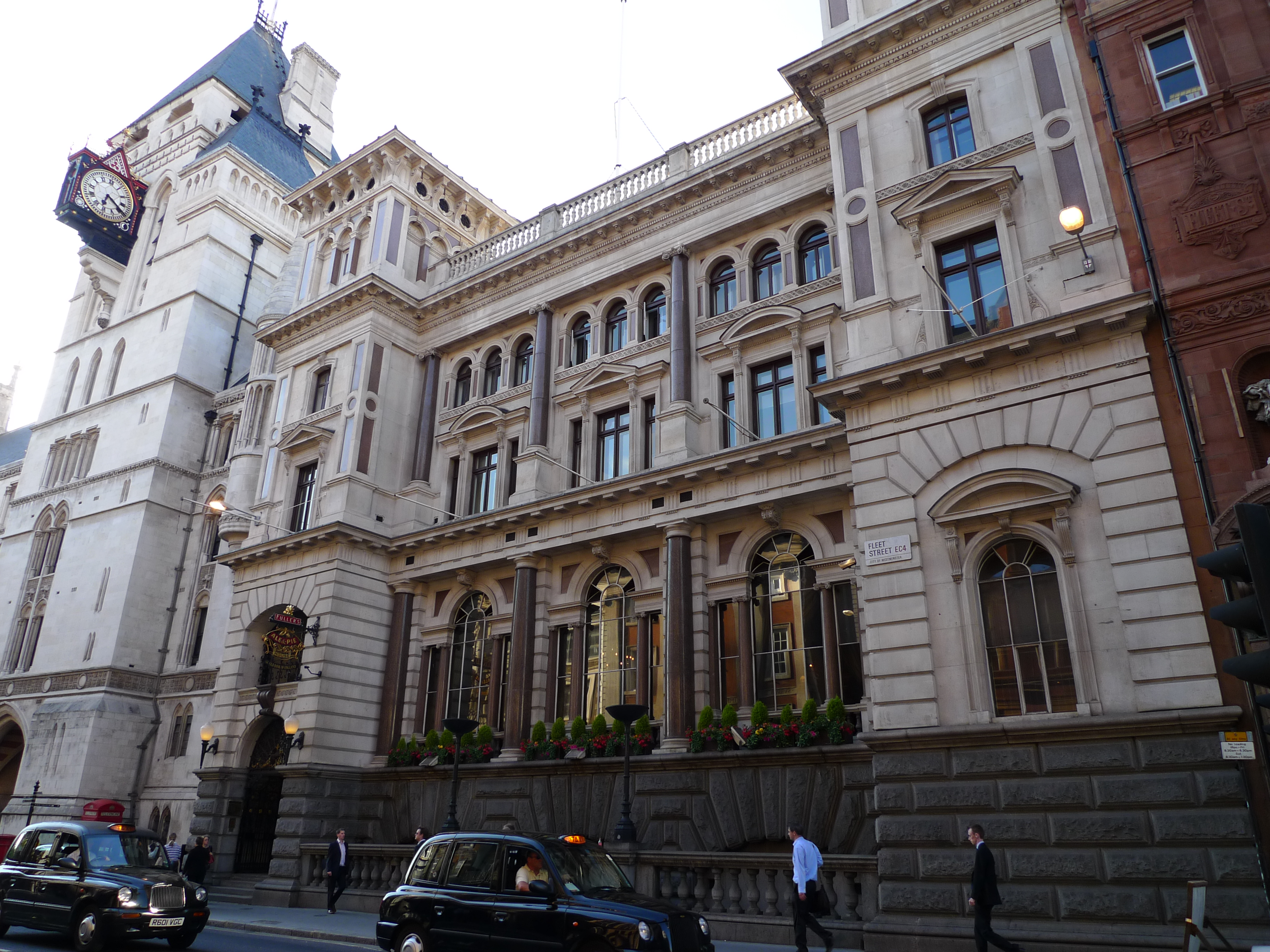
Old Bank of England, on Fleet Street in 2009

The site of the tavern and the southern end of Apollo Court was cleared in the nineteenth century to make way for a branch of the Bank of England to serve the newly built Law Courts. The bank building later became a pub, The Old Bank of England. Present-day maps show that the northern end of Apollo Court is still evident on the ground and still accessible from Bell Yard.
