= Lelio Colista =

Italian composer

Lelio Colista (13 January 1629, Rome – 13 October 1680, Rome) was an Italian Baroque composer, lutenist, and guitarist.

Funded by his father, who held an important position in the Vatican Library, Colista early received an excellent musical education, probably at the Seminario Romano. He mastered several instruments, especially the lute, guitar, and theorbo. Already, at the age of 30, he held a lucrative post of custode delle pittore at the papal chapel. In the decade that followed (the 1660s), he was maestro di cappella at the titular church in Rome San Marcello al Corso; two oratorios he wrote for San Marcello in 1661 and 1667 are now lost. In 1664, along with Bernardo Pasquini, he was part of the entourage of 200 that accompanied Cardinal Flavio Chigi on a diplomatic mission to the court of Louis XIV in Versailles. During the last 20 years of his life, he was a composer and teacher in Rome, who was in demand. He was the guitar teacher of Gaspar Sanz. In 1675, he became a member of the Arciconfraternita delle Sacre Stimatte in Rome.

He wrote mostly instrumental music, and, though no pieces were published during his lifetime, his influence on the musicians residing in Rome and England was significant. Colista influenced Corelli's and Purcell's trio sonatas through his early da chiesa sonatas for two violins and basso continuo, which the composer described as symphonies. Arcangelo Corelli mentioned Colista in the preface to his Opus 1 as one of the più professori musici di Roma. Michael Tilmouth calls Colista "undoubtedly the most important of the Italian models for Henry Purcell's trio sonatas", "not only in terms of overall structure but also in the use of the term 'canzona' and in the nature and treatment, both contrapuntally and in regard to rhythmic modification of their thematic material."

Colista's music was admired both by the audience and the patrons. In 1650, he was described as vere Romanae urbis Orpheus (truly the Orpheus of the city of Rome) by Jesuit scholar Athanasius Kircher. His works are usually referred to by the thematic catalogue by Antonella D'Ovidio, denoted WK.

== References and further reading ==
- Wessely, Helene (1961). Lelio Colista: ein römischer Meister vor Corelli; Leben und Umwelt. Wien: Oesterreichischen Akademie Der Wissenschaften.
