= Maria Novella Piancastelli =

Italian physicist

Maria Novella Piancastelli is a retired Italian chemist whose research involves the experimental observation of electron configurations and shape resonance in atoms and molecules.

== Education and career ==
After professorships at the University of Rome Tor Vergata, Uppsala University in Sweden, and the Sorbonne University in France, she retired as an emeritus professor at the Sorbonne.

== Recognition ==
Piancastelli was elected as a Fellow of the American Physical Society (APS) in 2014, after a nomination from the APS Division of Atomic, Molecular and Optical Physics, "for studies of electronic structure and dynamics of core-excited and core-ionized atoms and molecules by means of x-ray spectroscopic tools".

In 2022, Elettra Sincrotrone Trieste named her as an Elettra Fellow. She is also a member of the Royal Society of Sciences in Uppsala.
