= Jean-Baptiste Anet =

French violinist and composer

Jean-Baptiste Anet (or Annet) (2 January 1676 – 14 August 1767) was a French violinist and composer.

He was born in Paris. He studied with Arcangelo Corelli for four years in Rome. Afterwards, he returned to Paris about 1700, and was met with the greatest success. There can be little doubt that by his example the principles of the great Italian school of violin-playing were first introduced into France. Probably owing to the jealousy of his French colleagues Anet soon left Paris again, and is said to have spent the rest of his life as conductor of the private band of a nobleman in Poland.

He published three sets of sonatas for the violin.

== Published works ==
- Premier Livre de Sonates à Violon seul et la Basse continue (Paris, 1724)
- Deuxièmme Livre de Mr. Baptiste, contenant Deux Suites de pièces à deux Musettes, qui conviennent à la Flûte Traversière, Hautbois, Violons comme aussi les Vielles (Paris, 1726)
- Sonates à Violon seul et Basse continue, Œuvre III (Paris, 1729)
- Premier Œuvre de Musettes (Paris, 1730)
- Second Œuvre de Musettes (Paris, 1730)
- III^{e} Œuvre de Musettes Pour les Violons, Flûtes Traversières et Vielles (Paris, 1734)

== Selected recordings ==
Sonate n 11, du Premier Livre de Sonates à violon seul et la basse (1724), Théotime Langlois de Swarte, violin, Justin Taylor, harpsichord. CD Alpha 2022 Diapason d’or
