= Arcangelo Corelli =

Italian violinist and composer (1653–1713)

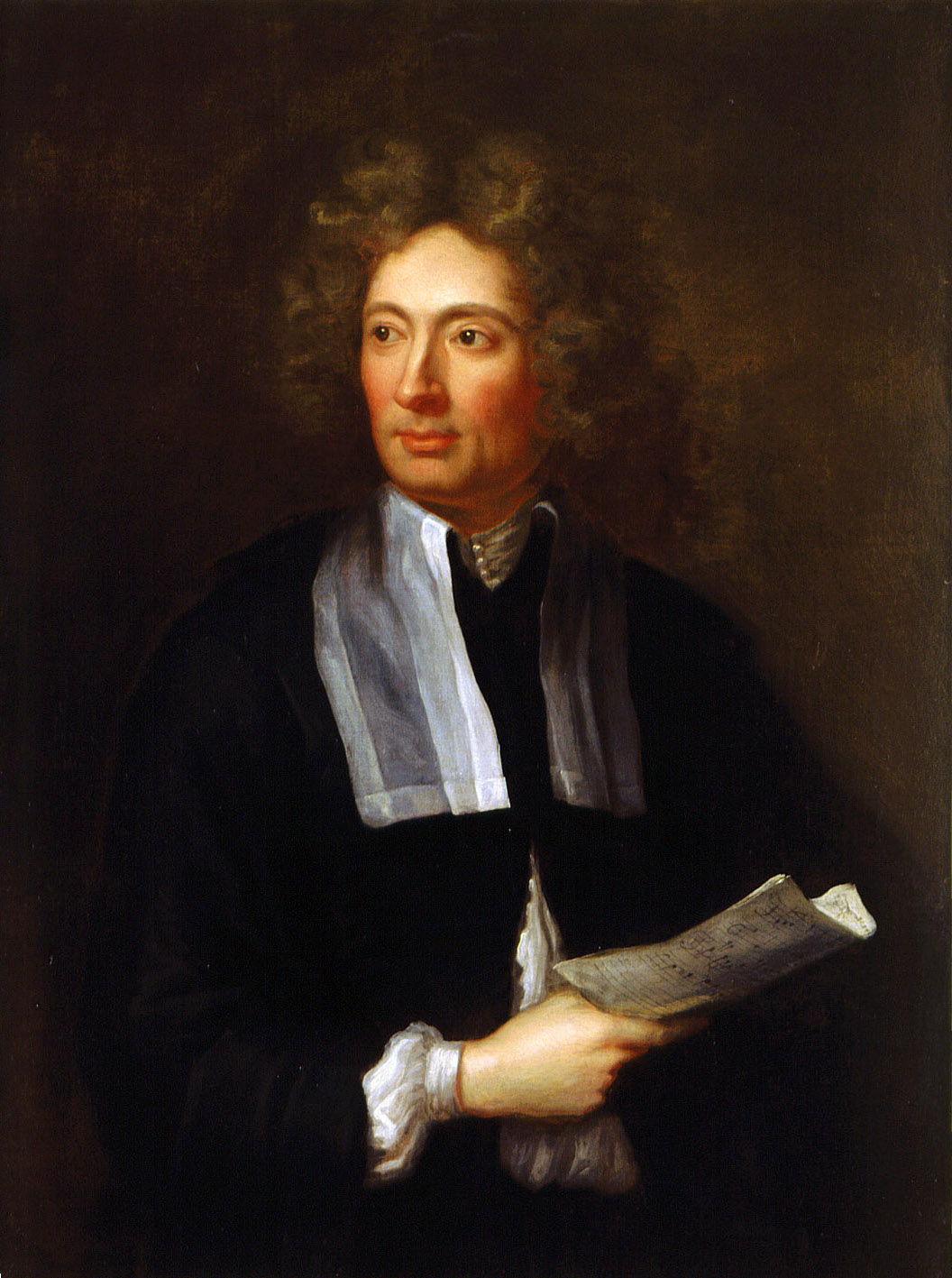
- 1697 portrait
- Born: 17 February 1653; Fusignano
- Died: 8 January 1713 (aged 59); Rome
- Occupation: Composer

Arcangelo Corelli (/kəˈrɛli/, also UK: /kɒˈ-/, US: /kɔːˈ-, koʊˈ-/; Italian: [arˈkandʒelo koˈrɛlli]; 17 February 1653 – 8 January 1713) was an Italian composer, musician, and violinist of the middle Baroque era. His music was key in the development of the modern genres of sonata and concerto, in establishing the preeminence of the violin, and as the first coalescing of modern tonality and functional harmony.

== Early life and education ==
=== Childhood ===
Baptismal records indicate that Corelli was born on 17 February 1653 in the small Romagna town of Fusignano, then in the diocese of Ferrara, in the Papal States. His ancestors had been in Fusignano and land-owners there since 1506, when a Corelli moved to the area from Rome. Although apparently prosperous, they were almost certainly not of the nobility, as several fanciful accounts of the composer's genealogy subsequently claimed. (Note: Some family trees even attempted to trace Corelli's ancestors back to Noah. Contemporary documents in the Piancastelli collection in Forlì provide valuable background information about the genealogy and character of the Corelli family. Maps indicate that the Corellis owned a conspicuous quantity of agricultural land around Fusignano. Despite their religious piety, the Corellis appear to have been embroiled in a conflict with the Calcagnini family, the established feudal rulers of Fusignano; in 1632, the papal executioner beheaded and quartered a certain Rodolfo Corelli after a failed uprising in which his family house was torn down.) Corelli's father, from whom he took the name Arcangelo, died five weeks before the composer's birth. Consequently, he was raised by his mother, Santa (née Ruffini, or Raffini), alongside four elder siblings, including Ippolito Corelli (1643–1727), Domenico Corelli (1647–1719) and Giacinto Corelli (1649–1719).

The wealth of anecdotes and legends attached to Corelli contrasts sharply with the paucity of reliable contemporary evidence documenting events in his life. This gap is especially pronounced for his formative years, including his musical education; traditional accounts of a highly idealized childhood have long been debunked. (Note: Most famously, Abbot Cesare Felice Laurenti's late eighteenth century "History of Fusignano" had Corelli born into a family of noble descent. As a young child, he is said to have been so transfixed by the violin playing of his local priest that he begged for lessons, which were conceded by another priest in the neighbouring town of San Savino, where the boy walked every day, come rain or shine. While sheltering from the sun along the road, so the story goes, his magnificent violin playing would leave the locals entranced. Having rapidly surpassed his teacher, Corelli is said to have defied the wishes of his father (who in this account is still alive) to study in Faenza, where the young genius is casually discovered by Cardinal Ottoboni, who recommends him to the pope, who in turn promptly summons him to Rome. Fictitious accounts such as this were comprehensively exposed in the pioneering biographies of Carlo Piancastelli (1914) and Marc Pincherle (1933).)

=== Musical education ===
Corelli was trained in Bologna and Rome and spent most of his career there with the protection of wealthy patrons.

According to the poet Giovanni Mario Crescimbeni, who presumably knew the composer well, Corelli initially studied music under a priest in the nearby town of Faenza, and then in Lugo, before moving in 1666 to Bologna. A major centre of musical culture of the time, Bologna had a flourishing school of violinists associated with Ercole Gaibara and his pupils, Giovanni Benvenuti and Leonardo Brugnoli. Reports by later sources link Corelli's musical studies with several master violinists, including Benvenuti, Brugnoli, Bartolomeo Laurenti and Giovanni Battista Bassani. Although historically plausible, these accounts remain largely unconfirmed, as does the claim that the papal contralto Matteo Simonelli first taught him to write in the "Palestrina style". (Note: The plausible notion that Corelli was taught by Benvenuti was fostered by Padre Martini in 1748 in his capacity as official chronicler of the Accademia Filarmonica of Bologna. Martini also states that Corelli secretly learnt Brugnoli's distinctive performance style. The tradition that Laurenti taught Corelli was transmitted by the eighteenth-century English music historian, Charles Burney. The claim that Corelli was taught by Bassani was contained in a poem published in 1693 dedicated to Henry Purcell and then picked up by both Burney and his rival, Sir John Hawkins. Previously considered chronologically implausible, the knowledge that Bassani was active in Ferrara from 1667 has led to a reassessment of this possibility (though a story of an amorous connection between Corelli and Bassani's daughter is almost certainly an invention). The presumed link with Matteo Simonelli in Rome derives from the writings of the castrato Andrea Adami da Bolsena. Opinions regarding the historical credibility of such claims vary.) A remark Corelli later made to a patron suggests that his musical education focused mainly on the violin. (Note: Replying in 1679 to a request by Count Fabrizio Laderchi from Faenza for Corelli to compose a sonata for violin and lute, the composer acknowledges that hitherto his Sinfonie have been written merely to exalt the violin.)

Chronicles of the Accademia Filarmonica of Bologna indicate that Corelli was accepted as a member by 1670, at the exceptionally young age of seventeen. The credibility of this attribution has been disputed. Although the nickname Il Bolognese appears on the title-pages of Corelli's first three published sets of works (Opus 1 to 3), the duration of his stay in Bologna remains unclear.

== Career and professional success ==
=== Early career ===
Anecdotes of travels outside Italy to France, Germany, and Spain lack any contemporary evidence. For example, the anecdote that Corelli's continental fame stemmed from a trip to Paris at the age of nineteen, where he was chased away by an envious Jean-Baptiste Lully, seems to have originated with Jean-Jacques Rousseau. It was also claimed that Corelli spent time in Germany in the service of Maximilian II Emanuel, Elector of Bavaria (supposedly in 1681), as well as in the house of his friend and fellow violinist-composer Cristiano Farinelli (between 1680 and 1685).

Although it is unclear quite when Corelli arrived in Rome, he was certainly active there by 1675, when "Arcangelo Bolognese" (as he was referred to) was engaged to play as one of the supporting violinists in Lenten oratorios at the church of San Giovanni dei Fiorentini, as well as in the French national celebrations held each year on 25 August at San Luigi dei Francesi and during the ordination of a member of the powerful Chigi family at Santi Domenico e Sisto. In August 1676, he was already playing second violin to Carlo Mannelli at San Luigi dei Francesi. Although Rome did not have any permanent orchestra providing stable employment for instrumentalists, Corelli rapidly made a name for himself, playing in a variety of ensembles sponsored by wealthy patrons, such as Cardinal Benedetto Pamphili, for whom he played in Lenten oratorios at San Marcello from 1676 to 1679.

=== Professional success ===
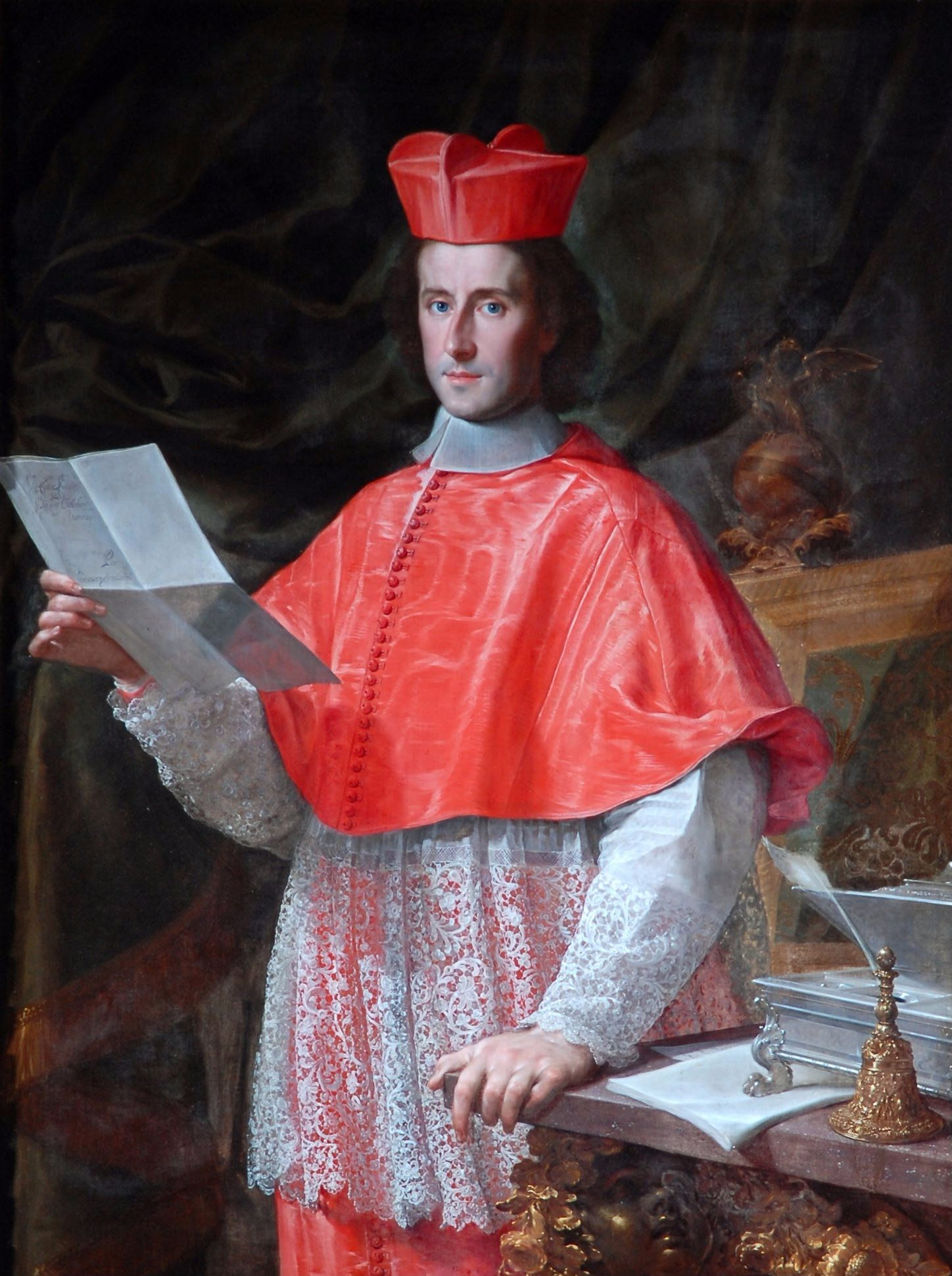
Cardinal Pietro Ottoboni, portrait by Francesco Trevisani

Though his entire production is limited to just six published collections – five of which are trio sonatas or solo and one of concerti grossi, he achieved great fame and success throughout Europe, in the process crystallizing widely influential musical models.

His writing has been described as having balance, original harmonies, richness of textures, theatricality, and clear, expressive and melodious polyphony, representative of Classical ideals, although belonging to the Baroque era and often employing resources typical of this school, such as the exploration of dynamic and expressive contrasts, but tempered by a sense of moderation. He was the first to fully apply, with an expressive and structuring purpose, the new tonal system, consolidated after at least two hundred years of experimentation. As a virtuoso violinist, he was considered one of the greatest of his generation and contributed, thanks to the development of modern playing techniques and to his many disciples scattered throughout Europe, to placing the violin among the most prestigious solo instruments and was also a significant figure in the evolution of the traditional orchestra.

A dominant figure in Roman musical life and internationally highly regarded, he was desired by many courts and was included in the most prestigious artistic and intellectual society of his time, the Pontifical Academy of Arcadia. He was known in his time as "the new Orpheus", "the prince of musicians" and other similar adjectives, great folklore was generated around his figure and his fame did not diminish after his death. Even today his work is the subject of a voluminous critical bibliography and his sonatas are still widely used in musical academies as didactic material as well as pieces capable of affirming themselves in today's concert repertoire. His position in the history of Western music is considered crucial, being recognized as one of the greatest masters at the turn of the 17th and 18th century, as well as one of the earliest and greatest classicists.

In 1687, Corelli led the festival performances of music for Queen Christina of Sweden. He was also a favorite of Cardinal Pietro Ottoboni, grandnephew of another Cardinal Pietro Ottoboni, who in 1689 became Pope Alexander VIII. From 1689 to 1690, he was in Modena. The Duke of Modena was generous to him. In 1706, Corelli was elected a member of the Pontificia Accademia degli Arcadi (the Arcadian Academy of Rome). He received the Arcadian name of Arcomelo Erimanteo.

In 1708, he returned to Rome, living in the palace of Cardinal Ottoboni. His visit to Naples, at the invitation of King Philip V, took place in the same year. The style of execution introduced by Corelli and preserved by his pupils, such as Francesco Geminiani, Pietro Locatelli, Pietro Castrucci, Francesco Antonio Bonporti, Giovanni Stefano Carbonelli, Francesco Gasparini, and others, was of vital importance for the development of violin playing. It has been said that the paths of all of the famous violinist-composers of 18th-century Italy led to Arcangelo Corelli, who was their "iconic point of reference".

However, Corelli used only a limited portion of his instrument's capabilities. This may be seen from his writings. The parts for violin very rarely proceed above D on the highest string, sometimes reaching the E in fourth position on the highest string. The story has been told and retold that Corelli refused to play a passage that extended to A in altissimo in the overture to Handel's oratorio The Triumph of Time and Truth (premiered in Rome, 1708).

Nevertheless, his compositions for the instrument mark an epoch in the history of chamber music. His influence was not confined to his own country: his works were key in the development of the music of an entire generation of composers, including Antonio Vivaldi, Georg Friedrich Handel, Johann Sebastian Bach and François Couperin, as well as many others. Bach studied the works of Corelli and based an organ fugue (BWV 579) on Corelli's Opus 3 of 1689. Handel's Opus 6 Concerti Grossi take Corelli's own older Opus 6 Concerti as models, rather than the later three-movement Venetian concerto of Antonio Vivaldi favoured by Bach.

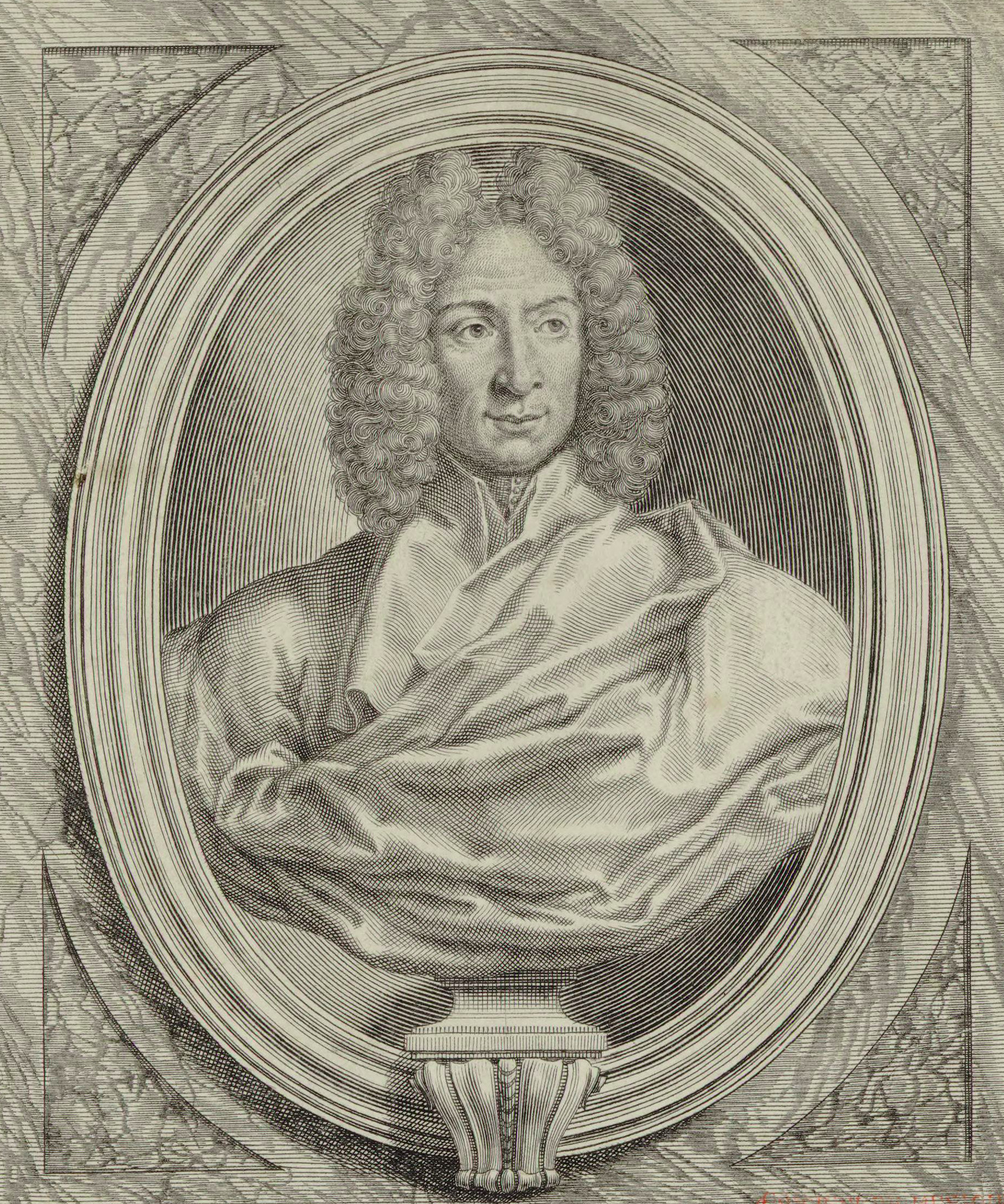
Engraving of a bust of Corelli from the title page of his Twelve Concerti Grossi, Op.6 (pub. 1714)

Musical society in Rome also owed much to Corelli. He was received in the highest circles of the aristocracy, and for a long time presided at the celebrated Monday concerts in the palace of Cardinal Ottoboni.

=== Death ===
Corelli died in Rome in possession of a fortune of 120,000 marks and a valuable collection of works of art and fine violins, the only luxury in which he had indulged. He left both to his benefactor and friend, who generously made over the money to Corelli's relatives. Corelli is buried in the Pantheon at Rome.

== Works ==
Christmas Concerto, movements 1–2
Performed by the Advent Chamber Orchestra

Christmas Concerto, movements 4–6
Performed by the Advent Chamber Orchestra

Concerto Grosso Op. 6 No. 4 – 1. Adagio – Allegro
Performed by the Advent Chamber Orchestra

Trio Sonata Op. 2 No. 11, 1st movement

Trio Sonata Op. 2 No. 11, 2nd movement

Trio Sonata Op. 2 No. 11, 3rd movement

=== Context ===
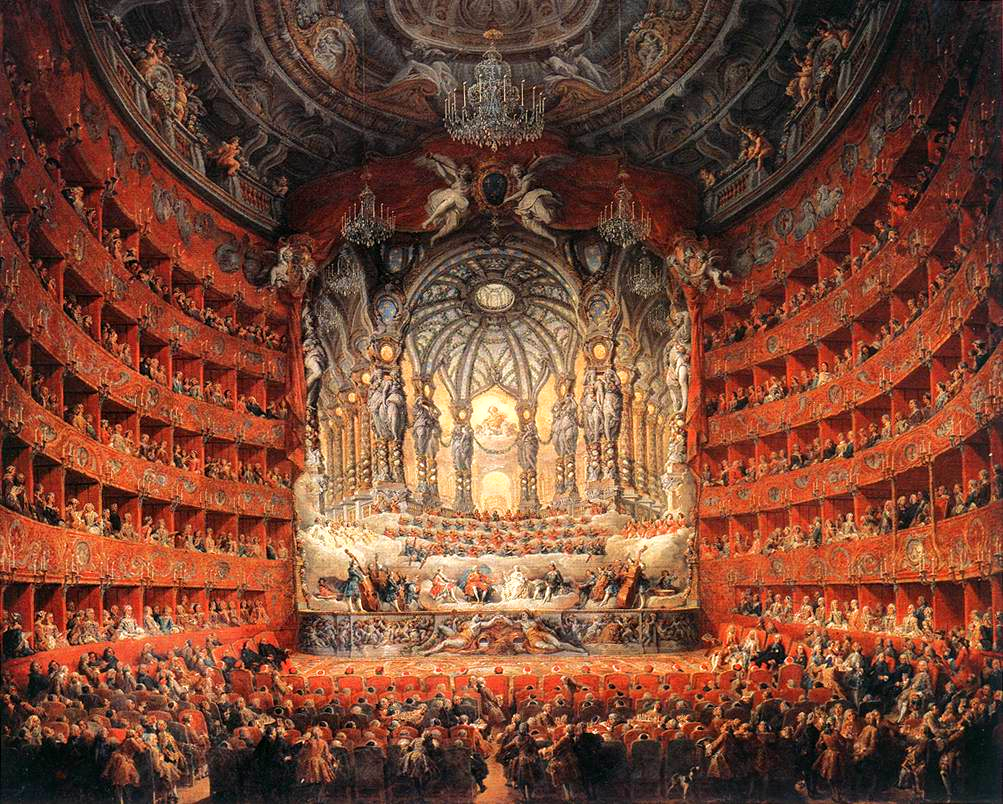
Teatro Argentina (Panini, 1747, Musée du Louvre)

Corelli's artistic figure flourished at the height of the Baroque, a cultural current characterized by an ornate and luxuriant artistic expressiveness, rich of strong contrasts. His music developed from the Renaissance polyphony, but was characterized by a transition towards greater independence between the voices. New socio-cultural and religious factors, as well as a strong influence of theater and rhetoric, led to the development of a renewed musical language that could better express the spirit of the time, thus developing a wide range of new harmonical, vocal and instrumental techniques. It is the period in which the tonal system is definitively consolidated, abandoning the old modal system, and which has its most typical expression in the writing style called continuo or figured bass, in which the bass line and the top line are written in full, leaving the execution of the harmonic filling attributed to the other parts to the discretion of the performer, indicated synthetically by the author by numbers. The great importance attributed to the superior voice, which relegated the other parts to a subordinate role, brought out the figure of the virtuoso soloist. The tempered tunings were also introduced, the melody often had popular inspiration and the dissonances began to be used as an expressive resource. Polyphony remained omnipresent especially in sacred music, generally more conservative, but the complexity that characterized it in previous centuries, which often made the sung texts incomprehensible, was abandoned in favor of a much clearer and simplified counterpoint, in which primacy was often given to the loudest voice. Furthermore, in the field of symbolism and language, the development of the theory of affects was of great importance, in which figures, melodies, tones and specific standardized technical resources became a musical lexicon at the service of expression. Such resources were very common in opera, the most popular and influential genre of the time, also exerting a decisive influence on the direction of instrumental music, a language that Corelli contributed significantly to articulate and affirm. At a formal level, the Baroque consolidated the forms of the suite and the sonata into multiple movements, which gave rise to the sonata da chiesa, the sonata da camera, to the sonata, to the concerto grosso, to the solo concerto and, later, to the symphony. In general, the changes introduced by the Baroque constituted a revolution in the history of music, perhaps as important as those promoted by the emergence of ars nova in the 14th century and avant-garde music in the 20th century.

Bologna, where Corelli originally studied, with its 60,000 inhabitants, was the second most important city in the Papal State, seat of the oldest university in the world and center of an intense cultural and artistic life. There were several large churches that maintained permanent orchestras, choirs and schools, three large theaters hosted dramatic and operatic performances, several publishing houses published sheet music, and there were at least half a dozen academies maintained by the nobility and higher clergy in their buildings. All of this defined trends and aesthetic canons, some dedicated exclusively to music, among which the most famous was the Accademia Filarmonica, founded in 1666 by Count Vincenzo Maria Carrati. An illustrious violin school was formed in this city, founded by Ercole Gaibara, whose principles were assimilated by Corelli.

Rome, on the other hand, had much greater traditions, wealth, and importance on several levels, starting with being the seat of Catholicism. Furthermore, it was a cosmopolitan capital that welcomed artists from all over Europe, eager to establish themselves in such rich, varied and influential settings, where the great patrons of the Church and the aristocracy challenged each other by organizing sumptuous presentations and promoting numerous artists. However, few churches and brotherhoods had stable musical bodies and there was a great exchange of professionals between one celebration and another. Unlike Bologna, in Rome the Church had a decisive influence on cultural life, and the guidelines in this regard varied according to the preferences of each pontiff. Pope Clement IX, for example, was himself a librettist of operas and oratorios and promoted secular music, and Corelli apparently found himself in this environment without any difficulty, although it is not known who introduced him to it. In any case, he soon gained the favor of patrons who were among the city's most prominent.

=== The violinist ===
As already mentioned, Corelli learned the fundamentals of violin technique in Bologna, and as a disciple of the virtuosos Giovanni Benvenuti and Leonardo Brugnoli, he followed the lines set by Ercole Gaibara, considered the progenitor of the Bolognese school. He later taught many students and spawned his own school, but despite his fame in this field, surprisingly few, inaccurate, descriptions of his technique survive, generating considerable controversy among critics, a shortcoming that is compounded by the fact that he did not write any manual or treatise about the topic. At the time there were several violin schools in Italy, which proposed different playing methods and even ways in which the player should hold the violin. There is considerable iconography describing these differences, where violinists rest the instrument under the chin, on the shoulder or against the chest, at different angles. Naturally, these differences involved different left hand and bow techniques and, to some extent, defined the style and complexity of the music they could perform.

During the 18th century, he was considered a great virtuoso, but critics of the 20th century have sometimes doubted the ancient testimonies. Boyden, for example, stated that "Corelli cannot claim a prominent place in the history of violin technique"; Pincherle considered him "inferior to his German and even Italian contemporaries in terms of pure technique", and McVeigh said that he was "certainly not one of the great virtuosos of his time". However, according to Riedo, such opinions are based on what can be deduced from the technical requirements contained in his compositions, but this method is not entirely faithful to reality, since the score only offers a vague idea of what could be a live performance, also observing that the style developed by Corelli was characterized more by sobriety and singability than by extravagance. Furthermore, his compositions, in their published version, are addressed above all to a heterogeneous audience and not only to specialists and virtuosos. At the same time, his works cannot be exemplary of his ability to interpret works by other authors, where he may have taken a different approach. The failures of the Naples recital and the confrontation with Handel in Rome, where he supposedly claimed to have no experience in French technique, are often cited as evidence supporting his limited violin technique, although they are not firmly demonstrated.

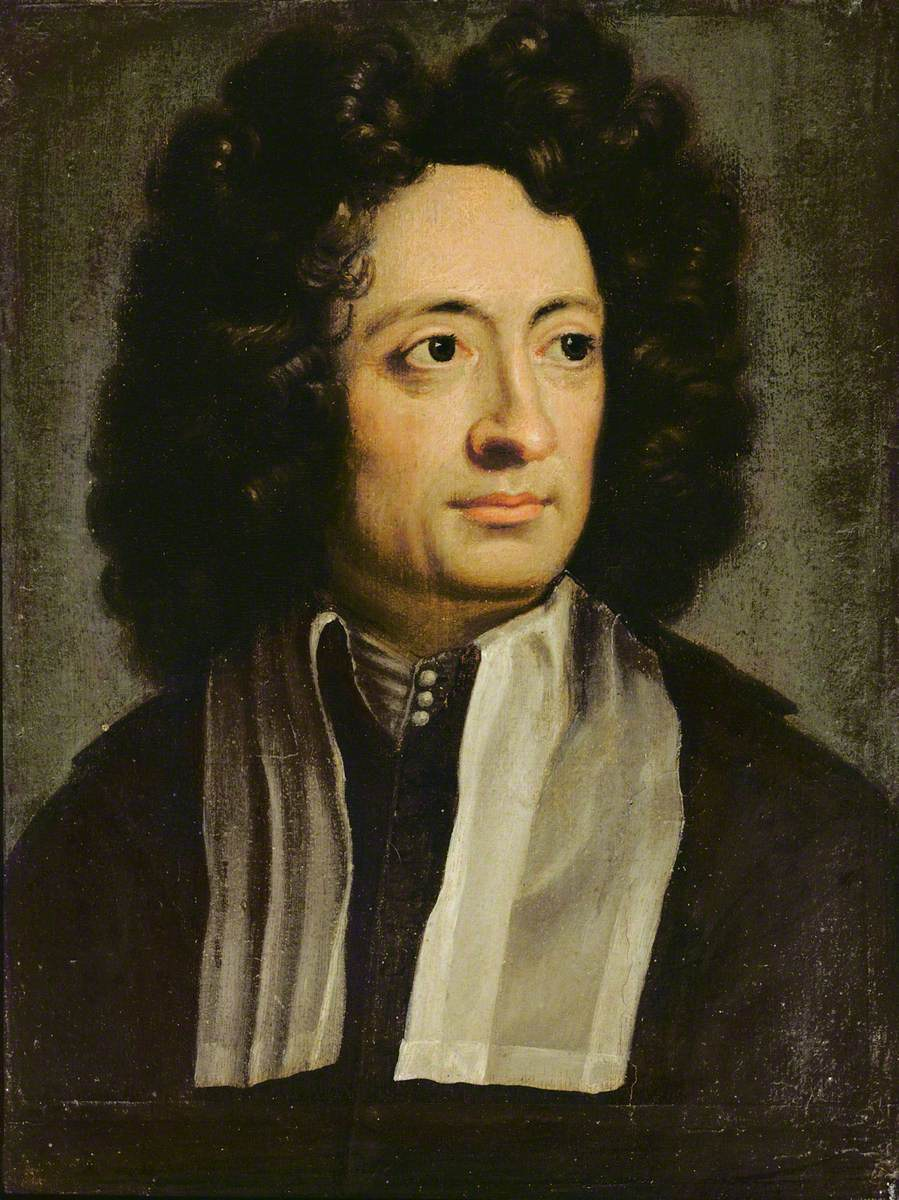
Portrait of Arcangelo Corelli by the Irish painter Hugh Howard

According to Riedo's research, which summarizes studies on this aspect, Corelli probably held the violin against his chest and projected it forward; this possibility is supported by engravings and drawings, as well as written sources, including descriptions of the performances of other violinists who had been his students or were influenced by him. This position was very common before his time, was dominant in the Rome of his time and remained common until the 19th century. Francesco Geminiani, who was probably his student, in his The Art of Playing the Violin (1751) wrote that "the violin should be held just below the clavicle, inclining the right side slightly downward, so it is not necessary to bend too much when playing the fourth string." Walls claimed that almost no virtuoso of the first half of the 18th century took a different stance. It provided the performer with an elegant attitude, in Corelli's case also important for being a patrician, but it slightly impaired the execution of the highest notes of the fourth string. Corelli's music rarely requires positions higher than the third.

Geminiani, who was also a virtuoso, gave voice to a very current vision of what is expected from a good violinist: "The intention of music is not only to please the ear, but to express feelings, touch the imagination, influence the mind, and dominate the passions. The art of playing the violin consists in giving the instrument a sound that rivals the most perfect human voice, and in executing each piece with accuracy, decorum, delicacy and expression according to the true intention of the music." In Riedo's words, "Geminiani's ideological and aesthetic views seem to correspond exactly to Corelli's compositions: he enhanced the textures, without acrobatic passages with extreme changes of position and without virtuoso effects. The positions of Boyden, Pincherle and McVeigh must be reconsidered, since this type of acrobatic virtuosity does not seem to have been Corelli's goal." Contemporary descriptions report that his performances were "erudite, elegant and pathetic, and his sound firm and uniform." Bremner wrote in 1777: "I was informed that Corelli would not accept into his orchestra any violinist who could not, with a bow, create a uniform and powerful sound, like that of an organ, by playing two strings at the same time, and maintain it for at least minus ten seconds." This suggests that his main concern was the mastery of bow technique, responsible for the overall sound produced and for the nuances and subtleties of dynamics and phrasing, which also coincides with claims of the time about Corelli's ability to express in the violin the most diverse emotions in their fullness, making his instrument "speak" as if it were a human voice.

Among the advances that he promoted in the technique are the more intense exploration of double strings (including figurations in a pedal note), the G string (little used until then), harmonics, arpeggios, and tremolo, of rubato, of staccato, of scordatura, of fast figurations in thirds, of chords of more than two notes and was the main proponent of the bariolage technique. Although Corelli did not write anything about it, the treatises published by Geminiani, Francesco Galeazzi and others influenced by him probably faithfully reflect the master's principles. His performances in various fields related to the violin – virtuoso, teacher and composer – have left an indelible mark on the history of this instrument and have laid the foundations of its modern technique.

It is known that he had many students, among them: Matteo Fornari, Giovanni Battista Somis, Pietro Castrucci, Giovanni Stefano Carbonelli, Francesco Gasparini, Jean-Baptiste Anet, Georg Muffat and Francesco Geminiani.

=== Conductor ===
Little is known about his performances as a conductor, except that he successfully played this role for many years at the head of the orchestras of the church of San Luis and the Academy of Drawing Arts and of countless groups formed for specific occasions, such as recitals in the private academies of the aristocracy, civic festivals and diplomatic receptions. The recognition he received was always very generous, and he was praised above all for the great discipline of the musicians he directed, always obtaining vigorous performances, with great precision in the attack of the notes and a powerful overall effect. Geminiani reported that "Corelli felt it was essential that the entire orchestra move the bows at exactly the same time: all up, all down, so that in rehearsals prior to performances, he could stop the music if he saw an out-of-range bow position".

Corelli was of vital importance in the process of transformation of the traditional orchestra. In the previous generation, ensembles were quite small even for opera performances and only on very exceptional occasions were large groups recruited, especially for open-air festivals. The orchestra of San Luigi, for example, did not exceed twenty members, even on prestigious occasions, and most of the time it consisted of about ten or fifteen members.

Thanks to the legacy of ancient polyphonic practices, ensembles made use of various instruments of balanced proportions, grouped in "choirs", each composed of several types of instruments. Corelli's generation began to change this balance of forces towards an increasing predominance of the string section, with an emphasis on the violins, significantly expanding the number of musicians, grouping the instruments into homogeneous sections and separating the singers from the orchestra. Its spatial arrangement also changed, adopting a distribution that favored the typical language of the Grosso concert, with a small solo ensemble, the concertino, separated from the large ripieno group.

In addition to conducting and being a concertmaster at the same time, Corelli was responsible for recruiting musicians to form occasional orchestras, paid salaries, and performed all the functions of a modern event manager. On some occasions he employed an immense number of musicians, up to 150, far above all the standards of his time. According to Crescimbeni's testimony, "he was the first to introduce ensembles in Rome with such a number of instruments and such diversity that it was almost impossible to believe that he could make them play all together without fear of confusion, especially since he combined wind instruments with strings, and the total very often exceeded one hundred elements." Although the number of musicians varied greatly in each performance, the balance of Corelli's orchestras was constant, with at least half of the musicians playing violins and a quarter occupied with cellos, violons and double basses. The remaining fraction was filled with a varied instrumentation of violas, wind instruments, lutes, theorbos, organs, harpsichords and others, and depended largely on the character of the music of the occasion. His intense activity at different levels in the field of orchestral music dominated the Roman scene and his role as organizer, dynamizer and standard bearer can be compared to that of Jean-Baptiste Lully at the court of Louis XIV. By extension, one could say that all the Roman orchestras between 1660 and 1713 were “Corelli's orchestra."

=== Composer ===
Despite the typically Baroque love for the extravagant, the bizarre, the asymmetrical and the dramatic, Corelli's production deviates from this scheme, favoring the classical principles of sobriety, symmetry, rationality, balanced and expressive moderation, as well as formal perfection, appreciated several times by coeval and contemporary critics, formulating an aesthetic that is among the beginners of the neoclassical school of music with considerable economy of means. In the description of the Larousse Encyclopedia of Music, "no doubt others before him showed more originality, but none in his day showed a more noble interest in balance and order, or in formal perfection and meaning. Despite his Bolognese training, he embodies the classical era of Italian music, thanks above all to the Roman tradition. [...] Although he did not invent the forms he used, Corelli gave them a nobility and perfection that make him one of the greatest classicists".

Corelli's works were the result of long and thoughtful planning, and were published only after careful and multiple revisions. His latest collection seems to have taken more than thirty years to complete, and a statement he left in a letter of 1708 attests his insecurity: "After so many and extensive revisions I have rarely felt the confidence to deliver to the public the few compositions that I sent it to the press". Such a rigorous, rationally and organized method, and such a strong yearning for ideal perfection, are other characteristics that make him a classic in opposition to the wild, asymmetrical, irregular and improvisational spirit of the most typical Baroque. For Franco Piperno, "his printed work has an exceptionally well-kept and cohesive structure, deliberately designed to be didactic, modeling and monumental. It is no coincidence that one of the figures on the title page of his Opera Terza is written "to posterity", that is, as posterity would see him: as an authority on composition, execution and pedagogy, a source of full of potential ideas". He was rigid also in the choice of genres to deal with: the trio sonata, the sonata for solo instrument and the concerto grosso. All his production is for strings, with continuo accompaniment, which could be performed by a variable combination of organ, harpsichord, lutes or theorbos. He left no works for voice, but his compositions reveal a strong influence of vocal music in their expressiveness, as well as in the treatment of polyphony.

In his time, the circle of fifths established itself as the main driver of chord progressions and, according to Richard Taruskin, Corelli practiced, more than anyone of his generation, new concepts with expressive, dynamic and structural purposes, which was fundamental for the sedimentation of the tonal system. Manfred Bukofzer, likewise, states that "Arcangelo Corelli deserves credit for the full realization of tonality in the field of instrumental music. His works happily usher in the late Baroque period. [...] Although closely linked to counterpoint tradition of the ancient Bolognese school, Corelli handled the new language with impressive confidence. On the other hand, chromatisms are rare in his music, but dissonances are relatively common and used as an expressive element, although they are always well prepared and well resolved. Critics have also highlighted the harmonious and balanced integration between polyphonic and homophonic elements, with polyphony which unfolds freely within a tonal structure. In his work there is an abundance of polyphonic expressive forms, the fugati, simple counterpoints and imitative writings, with themes that are repeated in succession by the various voices alternately, usually also called fugues, but in his style authentic fugues are rare, as his development differs from conventional models because of form, exhibiting a wide variety of solutions. According to Pincherle, one of the most significant aspects of Corelli's genius lies in the coordinated movement of these voices that intertwine, avoid each other and find themselves in such a way as to develop ever-changing motifs, establishing a unity through the motivic kinship of the different movements, a method which Fausto Torrefranca compared to the creation of "a frieze that runs along the walls and facades of a temple".

Among his influences are mainly the masters of the Bolognese school, such as Giovanni Benvenuti, Leonardo Brugnoli and Giovanni Battista Bassani. Also evident is the influence of Jean-Baptiste Lully, attested by Francesco Geminiani, as well as of the Venetian school, in particular Francesco Cavalli, Antonio Cesti and Giovanni Legrenzi. George J. Buelow, further, attests that the influence of Palestrina on the development of the polyphonic style of his music has been largely ignored, an influence received mainly through his teacher Simonelli, who was a singer of the Sistine Chapel, where Palestrina's work was one of the highlights of the repertoire.

Corelli's style has long been praised as paradigmatic for its clarity and its sober and expressive melodism, the quintessence of Arcadian good taste. Georg Friedrich Handel, Johann Sebastian Bach, Antonio Vivaldi, François Couperin, Giuseppe Torelli, Georg Muffat, Georg Philipp Telemann, Giuseppe Valentini, Benedetto Marcello, Pietro Locatelli, Giuseppe Sammartini, Francesco Geminiani and countless other musicians were inspired by the Corellian model in producing their orchestral music. In Rome its influence was so overwhelming that no composer of the next generation could completely avoid it. Along with Torelli and Vivaldi, Corelli was one of the key figures in establishing the concerto as a genre whose popularity still persists today. One American admirer was President Thomas Jefferson who regularly played the violin, and cataloged four of Corelli's sonatas in the library at Monticello.

An 1827 music dictionary still echoed what Burney had said more than thirty years earlier: "Corelli's concerts have withstood all the onslaught of time and fashion, more firmly than his other works. Harmony is so pure, the parts so clearly, judiciously and ingeniously arranged, and the overall effect, played by a large orchestra, is so majestic, solemn and sublime, that they disarm any criticism and make one forget everything that has ever been composed in the same genre". In the opinion of Michael Talbot, writing for The Cambridge Companion to the Concerto, it is difficult to explain the enduring popularity of this collection, considering the simplicity not the cause of its popularity, but only a precondition. He continues stating:

Corelli's genius lies rather in his ability to create satisfying forms without resorting to fixed formulas, in his ability to combine contrasting ideas [...], in his original inventiveness for atmospheres, and in his moments – more numerous than expected – of harmonic audacity. Among the unforgettable passages of the Concerti grossi are the poignant suspensions and enchanting octave doublings in the second adagio of the fourth concert and the magical change of key from minor to major at the beginning of the Pastorale that concludes the eighth concerto, an optional movement that was composed to be performed on Christmas Eve.

Corelli composed 48 trio sonatas, 12 violin and continuo sonatas, and 12 concerti grossi.

Six sets of twelve compositions, published between 1888 and 1891 by Chrysander, are authentically ascribed to Corelli, together with a few other works.

- Opus 1: 12 sonate da chiesa (trio sonatas for 2 violins and continuo) (Rome 1681)
- Opus 2: 12 sonate da camera (trio sonatas for 2 violins and continuo) (Rome 1685)
- Opus 3: 12 sonate da chiesa (trio sonatas for 2 violins and continuo) (Rome 1689)
- Opus 4: 12 sonate da camera (trio sonatas for 2 violins and continuo) (Rome 1694)
- Opus 5: 12 Suonati a violino e violone o cimbalo (6 sonate da chiesa and 6 sonate da camera for violin and continuo) (Rome 1700) The last sonata is a set of variations on La Folia.
- Opus 6: 12 concerti grossi (8 concerti da chiesa and 4 concerti da camera for concertino of 2 violins and cello, string ripieno, and continuo) (written in the 1680s, publ. Amsterdam 1714)
- op. post.: Sinfonia in D minor, WoO 1 (for Giovanni Lorenzo Lulier's Oratorium Santa Beatrice d’Este 1689)
- op. post.: Sonata a Quattro, WoO 2 (Rogers, Amsterdam, 1699)
- op. post.: Sonata a Quattro, WoO 3 (Rogers, Amsterdam, 1699 – incomplete/dubious)
- op. post.: Sonata a Quattro for Trumpet, 2 Violins & B.C, WoO 4
- op. post.: 6 Sonate a tre, WoO 5–10 (Amsterdam 1714)

== Legacy ==
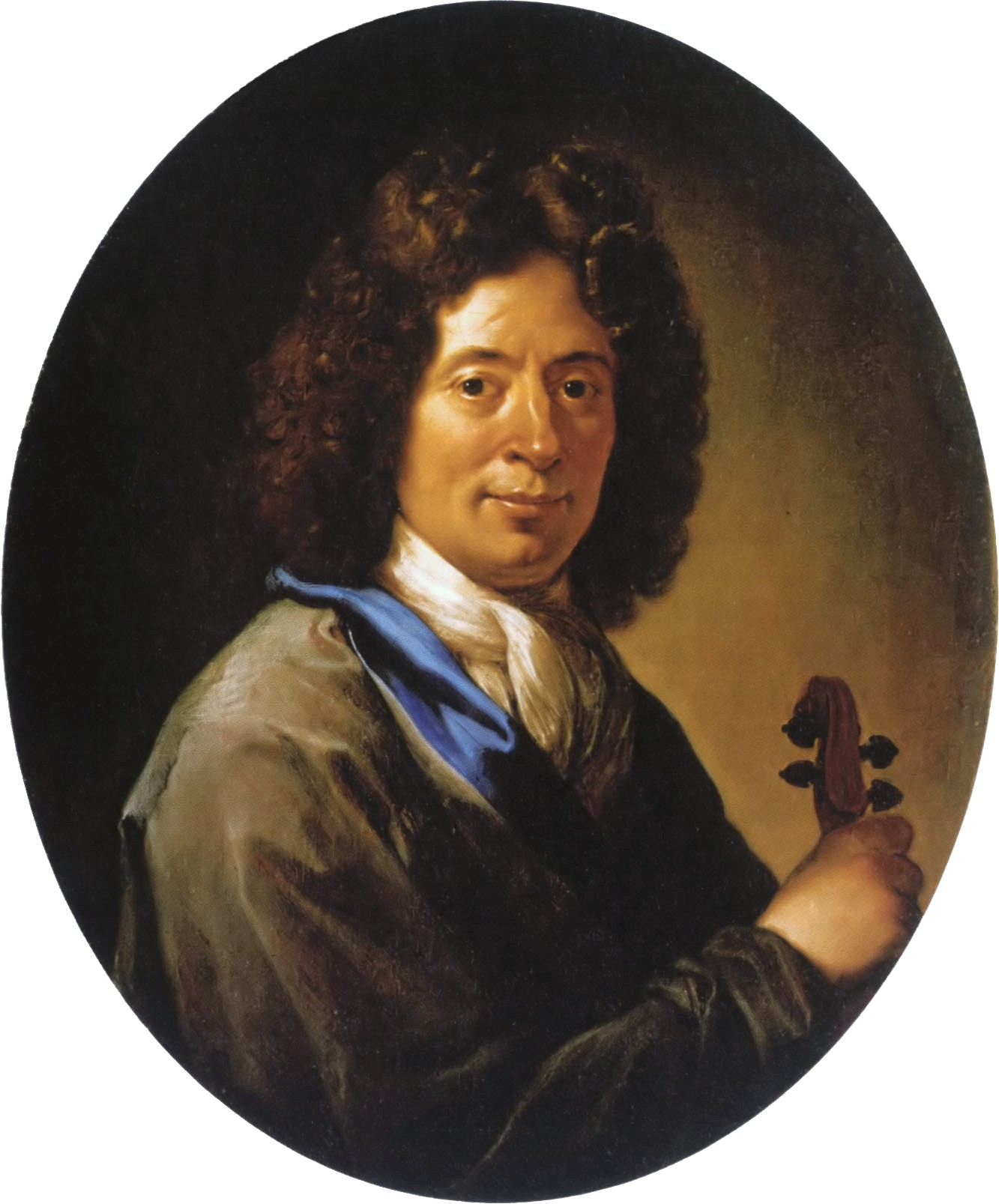
Portrait of Arcangelo Corelli by Jan Frans van Douven (before 1713)

His concerti grossi have often been popular in Western culture. For example, a portion of the Christmas Concerto, Op. 6 No. 8, is in the soundtrack of the film Master and Commander: The Far Side of the World, and Corelli's Op. 6 No. 2 also provided the theme for Sir Michael Tippett's Fantasia Concertante on a Theme of Corelli. British composer E. Florence Whitlock composed Variations on a Theme by Corelli for violin in 1968.

George Balanchine's ballet Square Dance (premiered 1957, revised 1976), is set in part to the Badinerie and Giga movements from Corelli's Sarabanda, Badinerie e Giga.

== Bibliography ==
- Piancastelli, Carlo (in Italian) Fusignano ad Arcangelo Corelli: nel secondo centenario dalla morte 1913, Bologna, Stabilimento poligrafico emiliano, 1914 [Reprinted 2011, Nabu Press ISBN 9781246456721]
- Pincherle, Marc, Corelli et son Temps Paris, Félix Alcan, 1933. [Translated, Russell, Hubert E M (1956) Corelli: His Life, His Work. New York. Reprinted 1968, The Norton Library, and 1979, Da Capo Press]
- Allsop, Peter (1999). Arcangelo Corelli: New Orpheus of Our Times. Oxford University Press, 1999. ISBN 978-0-19-816562-0.
- Philippe Borer, The Sweet Power of Strings: reflections on the musical idea of dolce, in Exploring Virtuosities, ed. by Ch. Hoppe, Hildesheim, Olms, 2018, pp. 211–240
