= Francesco Geminiani =

Italian composer and violinist (1687–1762)

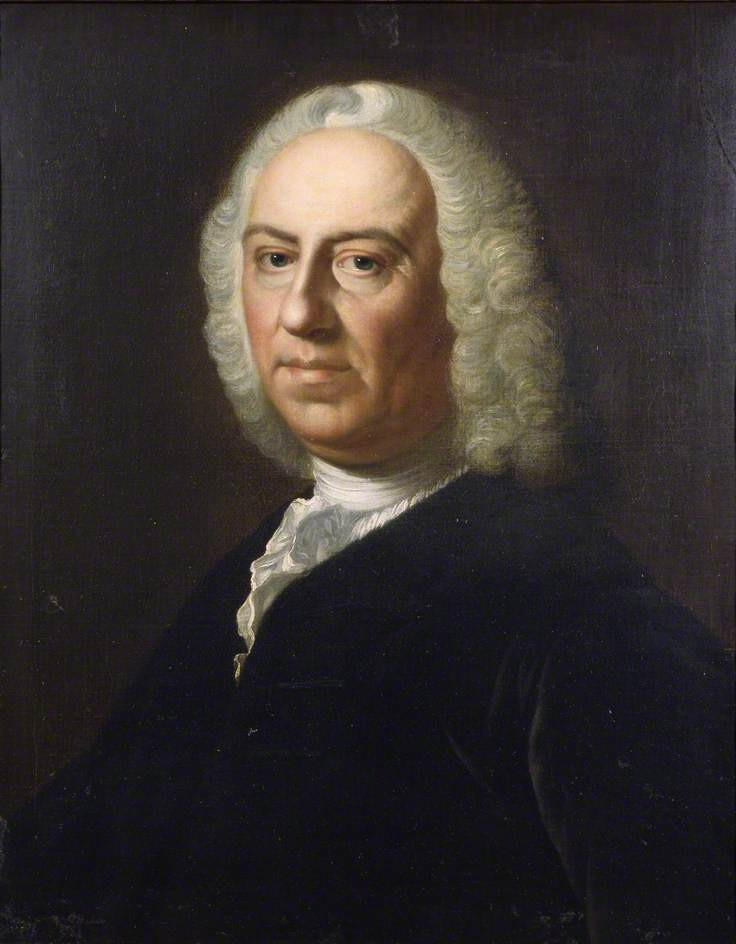
- Francesco Geminiani circa 1735 (originally attributed to Andrea Soldi)

Background information
- Born: 1687; Lucca
- Died: 17 September 1762 (aged 74–75)

Francesco Xaverio Geminiani (baptised 5 December 1687 – 17 September 1762) was an Italian violinist, composer, and music theorist. BBC Radio 3 once described him as "now largely forgotten, but in his time considered almost a musical god, deemed to be the equal of Handel and Corelli".

== Life ==
Born in Lucca, he received lessons in music from Alessandro Scarlatti, and studied the violin under Carlo Ambrogio Lonati in Milan and afterwards under Arcangelo Corelli. From 1707, he took the place of his father in the Cappella Palatina of Lucca. From 1711, he led the opera orchestra at Naples, as Leader of the Opera Orchestra and concertmaster, which gave him many opportunities for contact with Alessandro Scarlatti. After a brief return to Lucca, in 1714, he set off for London in the company of Francesco Barsanti, where he arrived with the reputation of a virtuoso violinist, and soon attracted attention and patrons, including William Capel, 3rd Earl of Essex, who remained a consistent patron. In 1715, Geminiani played his violin concerti for the court of George I, with Handel at the keyboard. In the mid-1720s, he became a freemason in London, notably as a leading member of the short-lived lodge Philo-Musicae et Architecturae Societas (1725–27) at the Queen's Head Tavern on Fleet Street. He seems to have retained his masonic connections thereafter. On 1 February 1725, he joined the Queen's Head lodge in London, becoming the first Italian to be initiated in the Freemasonry. On 12 May 1725, he became Fellowcraft and Master Mason on the same day. On 11 May 1728, the Grand Master of the Premier Grand Lodge of England James King 4th Baron of Kingstone designated the brothers Geminiani for constituting in Naples the first Italian regular masonic Lodge, directly affiliated to the English Freemasonry.

Geminiani made a living by teaching and writing music, and tried to keep pace with his passion for collecting by dealing in art, but not always successfully. Many of his students went on to have successful careers, such as Charles Avison, Matthew Dubourg, Michael Christian Festing, Bernhard Joachim Hagen and Cecilia Young. See: List of music students by teacher: G to J#Francesco Geminiani.

After visiting Paris and living there for some time, he returned to England in 1755. In 1761, on one of his sojourns in Dublin, a servant robbed him of a musical manuscript on which he had bestowed much time and labour. His vexation at this loss is said to have hastened his death. He died and was buried in Dublin, but his remains were later reburied in the city of his birth, in the church of San Francesco, Lucca.

He appears to have been a first-rate violinist. Tartini reportedly called him Il Furibondo, the Madman, because of his expressive rhythms.

== Works ==
Geminiani's best-known compositions are three sets of concerti grossi; his Opus 2 (1732), Opus 3 (1733) and Opus 7 (1746) (there are 42 concerti in all) which introduce the viola as a member of the concertino group of soloists, making them essentially concerti for string quartet. These works are deeply contrapuntal to please a London audience still in love with Corelli, compared to the galant work that was fashionable on the Continent at the time of their composition. Geminiani also reworked his teacher Corelli's Opp. 1, 3 and 5 into concerti grossi.

Geminiani's significance today is largely due to his 1751 treatise Art of Playing on the Violin Op. 9, published in London, which is the best-known summation of the 18th-century Italian method of violin playing and is an invaluable source for the study of late Baroque performance practice. The book is in the form of 24 exercises accompanied by a relatively short but extremely informative section of the text, giving detailed instructions on articulation, trills and other ornaments, shifting between positions, and other aspects of left- and right-hand violin technique. The instructions in this treatise are famously opposed to those expressed by Leopold Mozart in his Treatise on the Fundamental Principles of Violin Playing (1756) on several issues, including on bow hold, use of vibrato, and the so-called "rule of the down-bow", which states that the first beat of every bar must be played with a down-stroke.

His Guida harmonica (c. 1752, with an addendum in 1756) is one of the most unusual harmony treatises of the late Baroque, serving as a sort of encyclopedia of basso continuo patterns and realizations. There are 2,236 patterns in all, and at the end of each pattern is a page number reference for a potential next pattern; thus a student composer studying the book would have an idea of all the subsequent possibilities available after any given short bass line.

Geminiani also published a number of solos for the violin, three sets of violin concerti, twelve violin trios, the Art of Accompaniment on the Harpsichord, Organ, etc. (1754), Lessons for the Harpsichord, Art of Playing on the Guitar or Cittra (1760) and some other works.

== with opus number ==
- op. 1: 12 Sonatas for Violin and basso continuo (London, 1716)
- op. 2: 6 Concerti grossi (London, 1732)
- op. 3: 6 Concerti grossi (London, 1733)
- op. 4: 6 Concerti grossi (London, 1739)
- op. 4/II: 6 Sonatas for Violin and basso continuo.
- op. 5: 12 Concerti grossi after Arcangelo Corelli's Violin sonatas op. 5 (London, 1726/27)
- op. 5/II: 6 Sonatas for Violoncello and basso continuo (Paris, 1746)
- op. 6: 6 Concerti (London, 1741/42, lost)
- op. 7: 6 Concerti grossi (1746)
- op. 8: Rules for playing in a true Taste (London, ca. 1748)
- op. 9: The Art of Playing on the Violin, (London 1751)
- op. 10: Guida Armonica o Dizionario Armonico (ca. 1752, 1756 enlarged)
- op. 11: The Art of Accompaniment on the Harpsichord, Organ, etc. (1756)

== without opus number ==
- La Foresta Incantata
- 26 Violin concertos
- 24 trio sonatas for 2 violins and basso continuo

== Solo sonatas ==
- Sonatas for Violin solo
- Pieces de Clavecin (1743)
- Second Collection of Pieces for the Harpsichord (1762)
- Art of Playing on the Guitar or Cittra (1760)

== Criticism ==
Geminiani's compositions are noted for their imagination, expression, and warmth, but also for their lack of discipline and for under-development. Charles Burney took Geminiani to task for irregular melodic structure. Hawkins, on the other hand, was of the opinion that Geminiani's approach represented an important advance in composition. "That we are at this time in a state of emancipation from the bondage of laws imposed without authority, is owing to a new investigation of the principles of harmony, and the studies of a class of musicians, of whom Geminiani seems to have been the chief.... It is observable upon the works of Geminiani, that his modulations are not only original, but that his harmonies consist of such combinations as were never introduced into music till his time. The rules of transition from one key to another, which are laid down by those who have written on the composition of music, he not only disregarded, but objected to as an unnecessary restraint on the powers of invention. He has been frequently heard to say, that the cadences in the fifth, the third, and the sixth of the key which occur in the works of Corelli, were rendered too familiar to the ear by the frequent repetition of them. And it seems to have been the study of his life, by a liberal use of the semitonic intervals, to increase the number of harmonic combinations; and into melody to introduce a greater variety than it was otherwise capable of."
