= Giovanni Francesco Grossi =

Italian castrato (1653–1697)

Giovanni Francesco Grossi (12 February 1653 – 29 May 1697) was one of the greatest Italian castrato singers of the baroque age. He is better known as Siface.

== Biography ==
He was born near Pescia in Tuscany, entered the papal chapel in 1675, and maintained an operatic career in Venice and Naples. He derived his nickname of 'Siface' from his performance of that character in Cavalli's opera, Scipione affricano. It has generally been said that he appeared as Siface in Alessandro Scarlatti's Mitridate, but the confusion is due to his having sung the part of Mitridate in Scarlatti's Pompeo at Naples in 1683.

From 1679 onwards he was employed by Francesco II d'Este, Duke of Moderna and the Duke sent Siface to London to entertain the Duke's sister and recently married wife of James II, Mary Beatrice. He arrived in January 1687 but returned to Moderna in April after complaining of the adverse effects of the English climate.

He was murdered in 1697 on the road between Bologna and Ferrara, allegedly by the agents of a nobleman with whose wife he had a liaison, although later sources indicate that he was killed at the behest of the brothers of Elena Marsili, a widowed Countess, who Siface had an affair with when they were both at the court of the Duke of Modena.

Among Purcell's harpsichord music is an air entitled Sefauchi's Farewell, this is an arrangement of a tune that was popular at the time and presumably commemorated Siface's departure.
