= Sonata da camera =

Type of sonata allegro in musical composition forms

Sonata da camera is a 17th-century genre of musical composition for one or more melody instruments and basso continuo. It generally comprises a suite of several small pieces in the same mode or key that are suitable for dancing. A significant number of such works were produced during the mid- to late- 17th century by composers in Germany, including Heinrich Biber, Dietrich Becker, and Johannes Schenck. But the term sonata da camera came into use in Italy during the late 17th century, when the works of composers such as Arcangelo Corelli contributed to the popularity of both the sonata da camera and sonata da chiesa.

The term sonata da camera was originally used in its literal meaning of "chamber music", but later came to be used figuratively to contrast this genre of composition with the sonata da chiesa, which literally meant "church music", but generally comprised a suite of four movements with tempos following a largo–allegro–largo–allegro pattern.

In the Oxford History of Western Music, Richard Taruskin describes a sonata da camera as "... essentially a dance suite, which Corelli adapted to the prevailing four-movement format (a preludio and three dances or connecting movements)". The movements either were given tempo indications or names that indicated the style of dance, e.g., corrente, sarabande, or gigue. Nevertheless, there is great variation in the form of music that was called sonata da camera, including works such as Legrenzi's op. 4 of 1656, which are single movements in binary form, and Bononcini's op. 3 of 1669, which are also single movements, rather than a dance suite. After 1700, composers tended to merge the sonata da camera with the sonata da chiesa, and works comprising dance movements came to be called a variety of other names, such as partita, suite, ordre, ouverture, or air.

Sonata da camera were frequently composed for two violins and basso continuo. This three-part combination was also known as a trio sonata, but such works were often performed with a cellist or other instrument doubling the bass. Recent scholarship has revealed that the instruments used for to play basso continuo in Corelli's milieu were quite diverse, including theorbo, guitar, and organ. Ambiguities on the title pages of Corelli's works have led many to conclude that the continuo might have been either a harpsichord or a cello, rather than both, as was previously assumed.

And in the earlier days,these are still known styles and also with its name.
