= Marc Pincherle =

French musicologist, music critic and violinist

Marc Pincherle was born in Constantine on 13 June 1888 and died in Paris on 20 June 1974. A French musicologist, music critic and violinist, he was the pupil of Louis Laloy, André Pirro and Romain Rolland, among others.

From 1913 on, when the life and works of Antonio Vivaldi became the subject of his doctoral thesis, he was instrumental in the rediscovery of a number of baroque composers. His biography of Vivaldi, published after World War II, was the basis for all further research regarding the composer and is still considered an influential and significant work to this day. He was also the first to organize Vivaldi's works; older publications and recordings often cite the Pincherle (or 'P') numbers, although the 'RV' catalogue devised by Ryom is now almost universally used.

Pincherle was one of the founding members of the Académie Charles-Cros. He was president of the French association of musicologists Société française de musicologie (1947–1955).

== Works ==
- Vivaldi : Génie du baroque (1948; English translation by Christopher Hatch, 1957)
- Jean-Marie Leclair l’aîné (La Colombe, Paris, 1952)
- Corelli et son temps (Éditions Le Bon Plaisir, Paris, 1954)
- Le Monde des virtuoses (Flammarion, 1961)
- Le Violon (Presses universitaires, 1966)
- Tartiniana (CEDAM, Padua, 1972)
- An Illustrated History of Music (Reynal & Co., New York)
