= Jennie Smillie Robertson =

Canadian surgeon (1878–1981)

Jennie Smillie
- Born: February 10, 1878; Hensall, Ontario, Canada
- Died: February 26, 1981 (aged 103); Toronto, Ontario, Canada
- Resting place: Mount Pleasant Cemetery
- Education: Ontario Medical College for Women (merged into University of Toronto)
- Occupations: Physician and surgeon
- Employer(s): Women's Medical College of Pennsylvania, Women's College Hospital
- Known for: First female surgeon in Canada
- Spouse: Alex Robertson (m. 1948; died 1958)

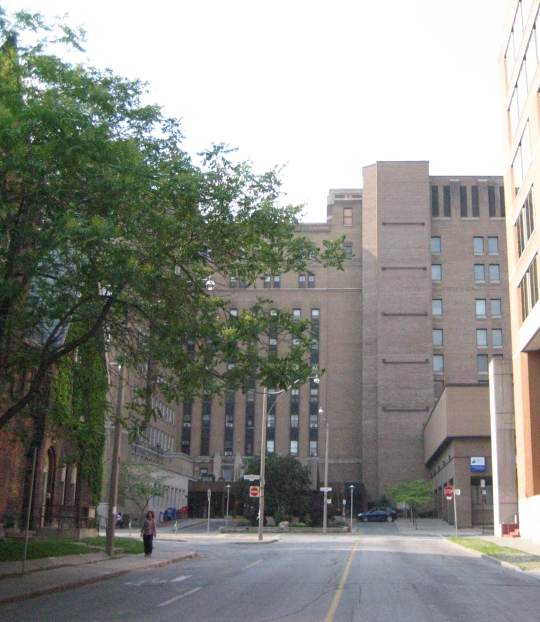
The Women's College Hospital in Toronto that Smillie helped found as the Ontario Medical College for Women.

Jennie Smillie Robertson (February 10, 1878 – February 26, 1981) was a Canadian surgeon, the country's first female surgeon who performed the country's first major gynecological surgery.

Born to farmers, she worked as a teacher to afford tuition for medical school before enrolling at the Ontario Medical College for Women which merged into the University of Toronto medical school during her time there. Due to a lack of options in Toronto, she completed her training in the United States. In 1911, she helped re-found her alma mater as today's Women's College Hospital after no Toronto hospital would let her perform surgery. She died at age 103.

== Early life and education ==
Smillie was born on February 10, 1878, on a farm outside of Hensall, Ontario, to Benjamin Smillie (1839–1886) and Jane Smillie (née Buchanan; 1849–1906) as one of several children. Smillie attended public schools in Hensall and later in Seaforth. She showed interest in medical science at an early age. As an adult, she told another female doctor and friend, "I was only 3 when I first thought about being a doctor. I heard of a woman missionary doctor. When I was 5 I asked my mother if women could be doctors. She told me they could and from then on I knew that is what I would do."

Smillie was initially educated as a teacher and worked until age 25 to save for tuition for the Ontario Medical College for Women. Before her second year of medical school in 1906, the college merged with the University of Toronto’s medical school, making the school coeducational; some women felt hostility from their male peers, though Smillie felt the women positively influenced the men. She graduated in 1909.

== Career ==
Medical internships in Canada were difficult for women to obtain; no hospital in Toronto would take Smillie as a resident intern, forcing her to move to the United States to complete an internship at the Women's Medical College of Pennsylvania in the city of Philadelphia. In 1910, she returned to Toronto to begin her practice but was not accepted by any doctor for surgical training. Thus, she went back to Philadelphia for six months of intensive training under another female surgeon, which included a week where she oversaw a surgical ward, an experience which she credited with building her confidence.

After Smillie's second return to Toronto, no hospital would allow her to perform surgery. Instead, she performed her first surgery (an oophorectomy to remove an ovarian tumor) using daylight on a patient's kitchen table, which made her the first surgeon to perform major gynecological surgery in Canada. As a result, she became the country's first female surgeon recorded in the field's modern era.

In 1911, Smillie and her female colleagues re-established the Ontario Medical College for Women as the Women's College Hospital due to an increase in female patients wanting their services and a growing number of female physicians in Canada. Prior to a building being built, the hospital was located inside rented houses, and its early financial difficulties led the founders to gather vegetables from farmers' wives to feed their patients. She joined the Women's College Hospital in 1912, shortly after its creation, where she went on to become Associate Chief of Gynecology, a position she held until 1942. She performed abdominal and gynecological surgeries until her retirement in 1948.

Outside of the hospital, Smillie was a founding member of the Federation of Medical Women of Canada and was politically active in liberal causes, at one point serving as president of the Women's Liberal Association.

== Later years and legacy ==
After her retirement, Smillie married widower Alex Robertson when she was 70, though they had met decades prior, explaining the delay with: "I first met [him] in 1898 while I was teaching. At that time I was planning for medicine, not marriage, and I didn’t think I could have both." He died ten years later. On her hundredth birthday she said there was not a day in her life when she did not want to be a doctor. Smillie Robertson died in a nursing home in Toronto on February 26, 1981, at the age of 103 and is buried in Mount Pleasant Cemetery, Toronto.

In 2013, Hensall dedicated and named a pocket park in her honour.

In 2016, Smillie Robertson was one of the nominees to be the first woman to have her likeness appear on a Canadian banknote. However, early civil rights activist Viola Desmond was chosen to be the first woman—and black person—to be honoured in this way.

In 2023, Halifax artist Jo Napier completed a portrait of Smillie Robertson, which currently hangs in the waiting room of the gynecologic oncology clinic of Halifax’s Queen Elizabeth II Health Sciences Centre.

== See also ==
- Jessie Gray
- Emily Stowe
