= 1861 in the United Kingdom =

Events from the year 1861 in the United Kingdom.

== Incumbents ==
- Monarch – Victoria
- Prime Minister – Henry John Temple, 3rd Viscount Palmerston (Liberal)

== Events ==
- 1 January – first steam-powered merry-go-round recorded, in Bolton.
- 15 February – about 350 convicts held on St Mary's Island at Chatham Dockyard take over their prison in a riot.
- 20 February – storms damage the Crystal Palace in London and cause the collapse of the steeple of Chichester Cathedral.
- 21 to 26 March – the Tooley Street fire in Southwark destroys several buildings.
- 30 March – William Crookes announces his discovery of thallium.
- 7 April – United Kingdom census. The population is more than double that of 1801 and those living in urban areas are in a majority.
- 12 April – American Civil War breaks out, leading to the Lancashire Cotton Famine (1861–1865).
- April – in London:
  - The Guards Crimean War Memorial is unveiled, including sculptures of Other Ranks.
  - William Morris founds the influential furnishing company, Morris, Marshall, Faulkner & Co.
- 13 May – British government resolves to remain neutral in the American Civil War.
- 17 May
  - A 7-day working men's package holiday to Paris, organised by Thomas Cook, sets out from London Bridge station.
  - Scottish-born physicist James Clerk Maxwell demonstrates the principle of three-colour photography in a lecture at the Royal Institution in London using a photograph captured by Thomas Sutton.
- 31 May – Perpetual Truce of Peace and Friendship signed between Bahrain and the U.K.
- July – outbreak of yellow fever onboard paddle frigate HMS Firebrand in the West Indies kills 52.
- 31 July – Bankruptcy and Insolvency Act codifies company law.
- 6 August
  - Criminal Law Consolidation Acts (drafted by Charles Sprengel Greaves) granted Royal Assent, generally coming into effect on 1 November. The death penalty is limited to murder, embezzlement, piracy, high treason and to acts of arson perpetrated upon docks or ammunition depots; the age of consent is codified as twelve. The Home Secretary takes over the power to reprieve or commute sentences from the judiciary and Privy Council.
    - Accessories and Abettors Act, codifying the law on accessories and abettors.
    - Coinage Offences Act, codifying the law on counterfeiting of coins.
    - Criminal Statutes Repeal Act.
    - Forgery Act, codifying the law on forgery.
    - Larceny Act, codifying the law on larceny and related offences.
    - Malicious Damage Act, codifying the law on criminal damage.
    - Offences against the Person Act, codifying the law on actual or attempted violent offence against the person and abortion, abolishing the nominal death penalty for buggery and creating the offence of "causing bodily harm by wanton or furious driving".
  - Lagos Treaty of Cession between the British Empire and Dosunmu ("Docemo"), Oba of Lagos, by which the latter, under threat of military bombardment, cedes Lagos Island to Britain, whilst retaining his title and powers, subject to English law, and allowing the Royal Navy's West Africa Squadron to have a base there to prevent the slave trade.
- 27 August – last execution in Britain for attempted murder – Martin Doyle in Chester.
- 16 September – Post Office Savings Bank opens.
- 7 October – the Greek Orthodox Church of the Annunciation, Manchester in Salford is consecrated as the oldest purpose-built Greek Orthodox Church in England.
- 23 October – foundation stone of the Royal Museum in Edinburgh laid by Prince Albert.
- 24 October – HMS Warrior, the world's first ocean-going (all) iron-hulled armoured battleship is completed and commissioned.
- 8 November – Trent Affair: Union-captained ship USS San Jacinto intercepts the British mail packet Trent at sea and removes two Confederate diplomats.
- 15 November – teaching begins at the London Academy of Music and Dramatic Art, founded by conductor Henry Wylde, the oldest specialist performing arts school in the British Isles.
- 25 November – a tenement collapses in the Old Town, Edinburgh, killing 35 with 15 survivors.
- 1 December – Trent Affair: the British government dispatches its diplomatic response, partly drafted by the terminally ill Prince Albert.
- c. December – first appearance of drag pantomime dame character Widow Twankey (Twankay), played by James Rogers in Henry James Byron's burlesque Aladdin or the Wonderful Scamp in London.

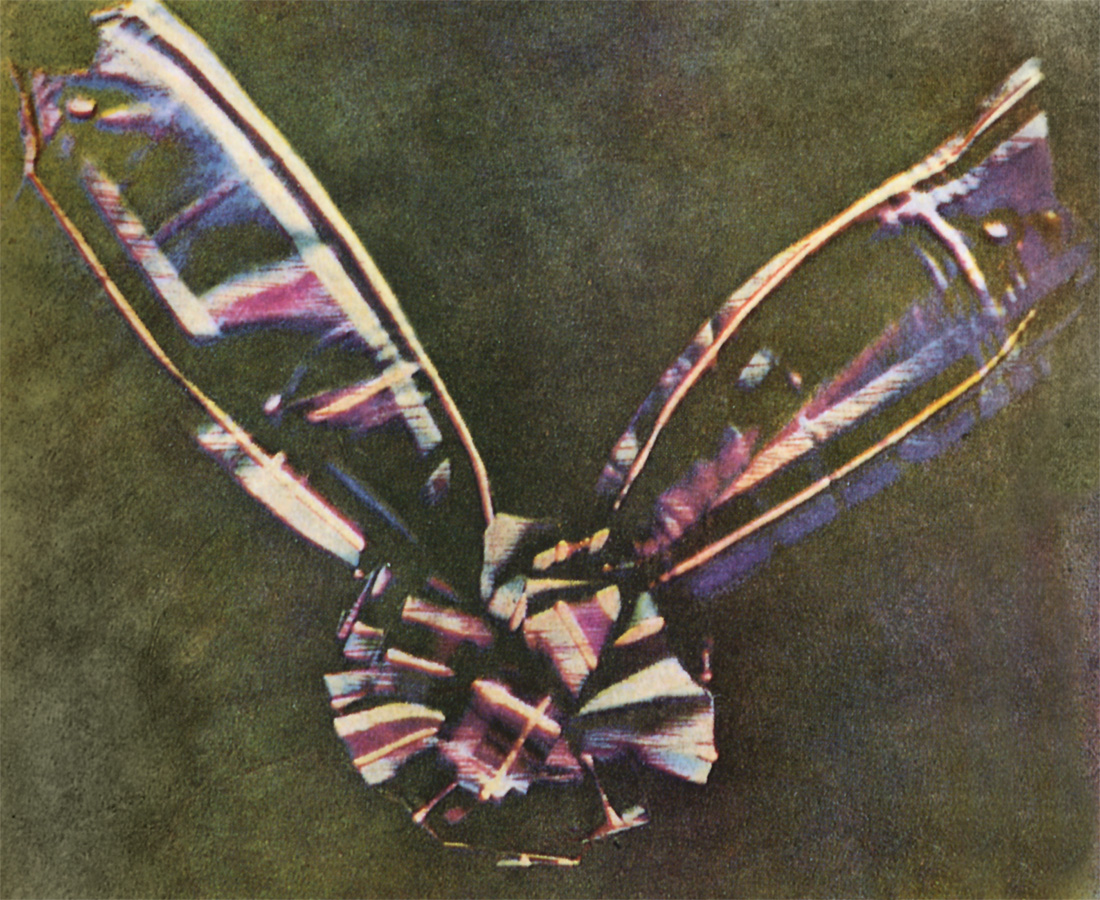
The first colour photograph presented by James Clerk Maxwell.

== Publications ==
- Mrs Beeton's Book of Household Management.
- Charles Dickens' novel Great Expectations complete in book form.
- George Eliot's novel Silas Marner.
- F. T. Palgrave's anthology Golden Treasury of English Songs and Lyrics, 1st edition.
- Charles Reade's novel The Cloister and the Hearth.
- Anthony Trollope's novels Framley Parsonage (book form) and Orley Farm (serialisation begins).
- Mrs Henry Wood's 'sensation novel' East Lynne.
- The anthology Hymns Ancient and Modern. This includes the setting "Eventide" by the music editor William Henry Monk for the hymn Abide with Me.

== Births ==
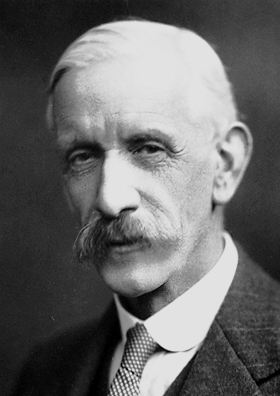
Frederick Hopkins

- 22 January – Maurice Hewlett, historical novelist, poet and essayist (died 1923)
- 15 February
  - Halford Mackinder, geographer (died 1947)
  - Alfred North Whitehead, mathematician (died 1947)
- 19 February – Henry Horne, 1st Baron Horne, general (died 1929)
- 23 April – Edmund Allenby, 1st Viscount Allenby, soldier, administrator (died 1936)
- 12 June – William Attewell, cricketer (died 1927)
- 16 June – Edith Aitken, headmistress (died 1940)
- 17 June – Sidney Jones, musical comedy composer (died 1946)
- 19 June – Douglas Haig, 1st Earl Haig, soldier (died 1928)
- 20 June – Frederick Hopkins, biochemist, recipient of the Nobel Prize for Physiology or Medicine (died 1947)
- 9 July – William Burrell, Scottish shipowner and art collector (died 1958)
- 4 August – Henry Head, neurologist (died 1940)
- 10 August – Almroth Wright, bacteriologist, immunologist (died 1947)
- 2 September – Arthur Beresford Pite, architect (died 1934)
- 23 September – Mary Elizabeth Coleridge, poet and novelist (died 1907)
- 12 October – Agnes Jekyll, née Graham, artist, writer on domestic matters and philanthropist (died 1937)
- 16 October – J. B. Bury, historian (died 1927)
- 23 October – Margaret McKellar, Scottish-born Canadian medical missionary (died 1941)
- 8 November – William Price Drury, novelist, playwright and Royal Marines officer (died 1949)
- 10 November – Amy Levy, novelist and essayist (died 1889)
- 10 December – Daisy Greville, Countess of Warwick, née Maynard, socialite, socialist, philanthropist and royal mistress (died 1938)
- 18 December – Lionel Monckton, musical comedy composer (died 1924)
- 19 December – Constance Garnett, née Black, literary translator (died 1946)

== Deaths ==
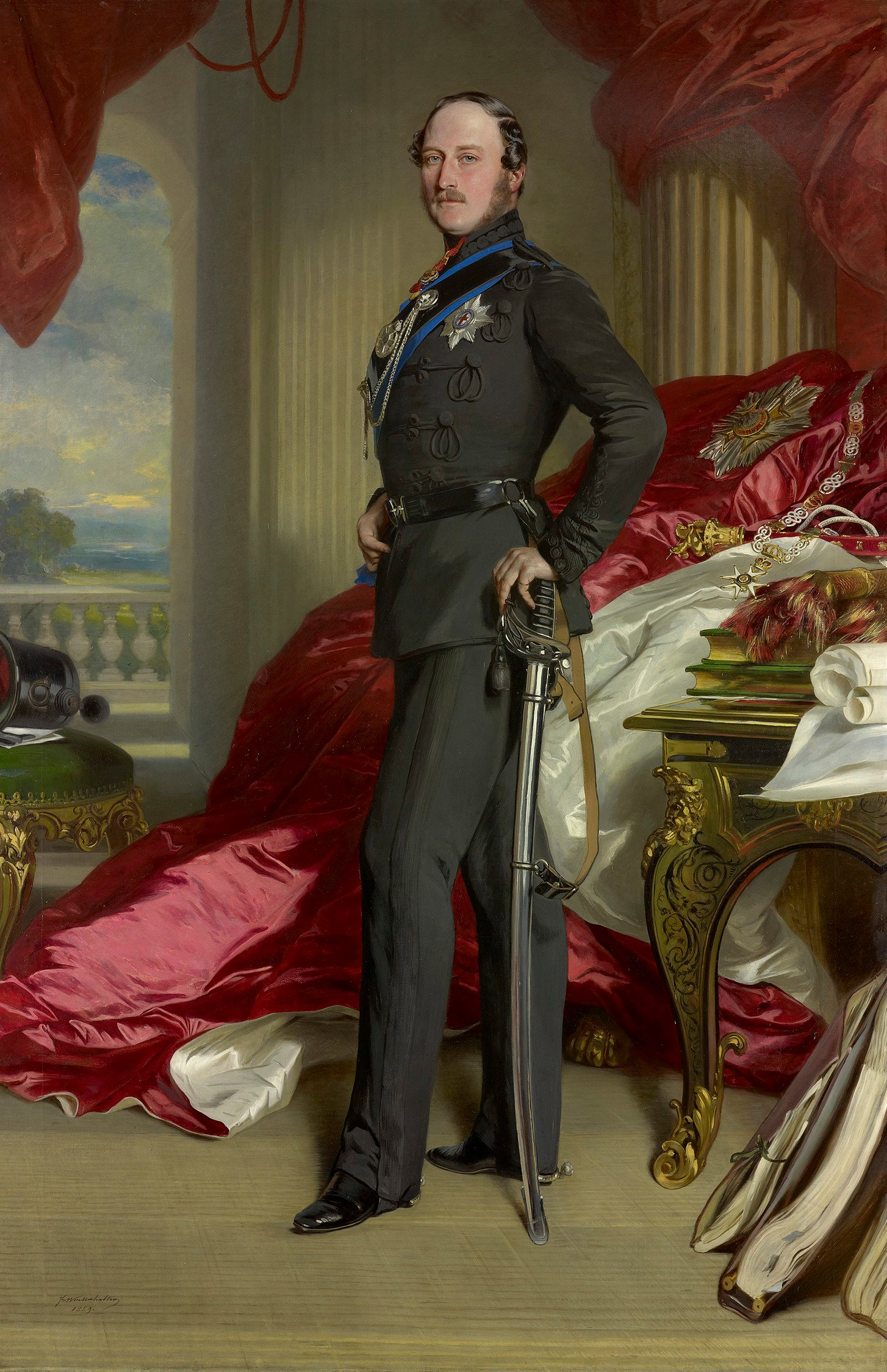
Albert, Prince Consort

- 17 January – Fanny Fleming, actress (born 1796)
- 29 January – Catherine Gore, novelist and dramatist (born 1798)
- 6 February – Bulkeley Bandinel, scholar-librarian (born 1781)
- 7 February – John Brown, geographer (born 1797)
- 16 March – Princess Victoria of Saxe-Coburg-Saalfeld, Duchess of Kent, mother of Queen Victoria (born 1786 in Germany)
- 8 April – John Bartholomew, Sr., Scottish cartographer (born 1805)
- 24 April – Sir Hedworth Williamson, 7th Baronet, politician (born 1797)
- 13 June – Henry Gray, anatomist (smallpox) (born 1827)
- 18 June – Eaton Hodgkinson, structural engineer (born 1789)
- 29 June – Elizabeth Barrett Browning, poet (born 1806)
- 6 July – Sir Francis Palgrave, historian (born 1788)
- 29 July – Richard Temple-Nugent-Brydges-Chandos-Grenville, 2nd Duke of Buckingham and Chandos, politician (born 1797)
- 3 September – Ernest Edgcumbe, 3rd Earl of Mount Edgcumbe, politician (born 1797)
- 4 October – Archibald Montgomerie, 13th Earl of Eglinton, noble (born 1812)
- 5 October – William Ranwell, marine painter (born 1797)
- 13 October – Sir William Cubitt, civil engineer (born 1785)
- 21 October – Edward Dickinson Baker, United States Senator from Oregon, 1860–1861 (born 1811 in the U.K.)
- 13 November
  - Arthur Hugh Clough, poet (born 1819)
  - Sir John Forbes, royal physician (born 1787)
  - John Hodgetts-Foley, politician (born 1797)
- 10 December – Thomas Southwood Smith, physician and sanitary reformer (born 1788)
- 14 December – Albert, Prince Consort, spouse of Queen Victoria (born 1819 in Germany)
