= Anna Marion Hilliard =

Canadian obstetrician

- Born: June 17, 1902; Morrisburg, Ontario, Canada
- Died: July 15, 1958 (aged 56); Toronto, Canada
- Resting place: Morrisburg, Ontario
- Education: University of Toronto

Anna Marion Hilliard (June 17, 1902 – July 15, 1958) was a Canadian physician best known for her contribution to the development of a simplified Pap test.

== Early life and education ==
Hilliard was born in Morrisburg, Ontario, Canada, to Anna and Irwin Hilliard. As a child, Hilliard played the piano, and at one point, wanted to become a concert pianist.

In 1920, Hilliard enrolled at the University of Toronto (Victoria College) and earned a Bachelor of Arts degree in 1924. She was awarded a Moss scholarship and continued her studies at the University of Toronto, pursuing a Bachelors of Medicine, which she earned in 1927. In addition to her studies, Hillard was recognized as a top Intercollegiate ice hockey player with the University of Toronto Varsity Blues (1922 to 1927), and was officially inducted into their Hall of Fame in 1987. To this day, the annual award for best women's hockey player in Canadian Inter-University Sports is named after Hilliard. She was also an active member of the Student Christian Movement, and served as President of the student chapter.

Hillard was a junior intern at Women's College Hospital in her last year of studies.

== Career ==
=== Europe ===
Hilliard wanted to become an obstetrician and so needed to complete an internship in this field. Aware that it would be difficult to compete for internships with her male peers in Toronto, Hilliard decided to take a postgraduate course in obstetrics in London, England. She also believed this would bring her sufficient prestige when she returned home to build a successful practice. When she first arrived in London, Hilliard had to work as a part-time cook to support herself. She found a supervisor and mentor in Miss Gertrude Dearnley, a gynecological surgeon. Hilliard attended meetings in England and Switzerland for the Student Christian Movement before beginning a six month clinical assistantship in the Hospital for Women in Soho Square. She also took a series of surgical tutorials with the head of surgery at the Royal Free Hospital. Hilliard's studies included the handling of septic abortions and work on sterility.

In October 1927, she passed her written and oral examinations, earning her degree of Licentiate from the Royal College of Physicians. In 1928, Hilliard became the third Canadian woman to be awarded Member of the Royal College of Surgeons. She was able to stop her part-time work as a cook and move into residence at Queen Charlotte Hospital for a course in midwifery. She next moved to the Salvation Army Hospital, followed by the Rotunda Hospital in Dublin, completing her post-graduate studies before her twenty-sixth birthday.

=== Canada ===
Hilliard began her career in Canada by setting up a general practice in the Physicians and Surgeons Building in Toronto and joined the obstetrical staff at Women's College Hospital. Dr. Jane Sproule-Manson gave her office space amidst her practice on the fourth floor of the building. Hilliard was the first doctor assigned to the Children's Aid Society, on whose behalf she lectured to church and school groups on health subjects. She also later acted as medical examiner to the Young Women's Christian Association (YWCA).

In 1929, Hilliard began to share both an office and flat with Dr Eva Mader. Mader and Hilliard were sharing offices in the Physicians and Surgeons Building with two other physicians at the beginning of the 1930s. Out-patient clinics were established to help with relief recipients. Hilliard handled obstetrical cases, seeing as many as sixty patients in the afternoons when she worked at the clinic. She acted as staff representative to the hospital's Medical Advisory Board. In 1934, she joined her Chief of Department, Dr. Marion Kerr, on a European study trip to Hungary and Austria. Hilliard followed courses and observed at Budapest's Polyklinic. Hilliard and Kerr also visited hospitals in Vienna and the Royal Free Hospital in London, before attending the annual meeting of the British Medical Association in Bournemouth.

In 1947, Hilliard was appointed chief of the department, a position that she held until she retired in 1957. Also in 1947, she collaborated with Dr. Eva (Mader) Macdonald, then Director of the Women's College Hospital laboratories, and Dr. W.L. Robison, to develop a simplified Pap test.

As an obstetrician, Hilliard was known for having delivered as many as fifty babies in a single month. She served as President of the Federation of Medical Women of Canada from 1955 to 1956. Her series of articles written for Chatelaine were published as the 1957 book A Woman Doctor Looks at Love and Life. That same year, she attended the United Nations Commission on the Status of Women as the Canadian representative of the YWCA. Cancer, diagnosed later in 1957, stopped her from being installed as President-elect of the Medical Women's International Association.

== Death ==
Hilliard died on July 15, 1958, in Toronto. When a new residence at Glendon College, York University was built in 1966, it was named in her honour.

== Works ==
- Hilliard, Marion (1958). "A Woman Doctor Looks at Love and Life". California Medicine. 88 (1): 90. PMC 1512275.
- Hilliard, Marion (1960). Women and Fatigue: A Woman Doctor's Answer. Doubleday – via Amazon. Published post-humously.
