= Marjorie Davis =

Canadian surgeon

Marjorie Ileen Davis
- Born: February 13, 1912; Franktown, Ontario, Canada
- Died: May 18, 2002 (aged 90)
- Education: University of Toronto (M.D. 1935)
- Occupations: Physician, Surgeon
- Employer(s): Women’s College Hospital, St. Michael’s Hospital, Toronto General Hospital, Bellevue Hospital (New York City)

Marjorie Ileen Davis (February 13, 1912 – May 18, 2002) was a Canadian physician and surgeon. Davis became a Fellow of the Royal College of Surgeons of Canada in 1947 and was the Chief of Surgery at Toronto’s Women's College Hospital from 1965 to 1976.

== Early life and education ==
Davis was born on February 13, 1912, in Franktown, Ontario. In 1935, she graduated from the University of Toronto’s Faculty of Medicine. She then began an internship at St Michael’s Hospital and the following year she joined Women’s College Hospital (WCH) as a Junior Interne. From 1937 to 1939, Davis travelled to New York City to complete an assistant residency in surgery at Bellevue Hospital. When she returned to Toronto, she became a surgical resident at Women's College Hospital until 1940. In 1942, she became the first woman to teach at the University of Toronto’s infamous Gallie program, a program inspired by William Edward Gallie that was a post-graduate training course in surgery and is still active today as the Gallie Course in General Surgery. In 1943, she completed her residency at Toronto General Hospital, thereby becoming the second woman to complete the residency program in surgery. In 1945, Davis received her certification in surgery and in 1947 she became a Fellow of the Royal College of Surgeons in Canada. Davis, along with Jessie Gray, Jean Davey, and Geraldine Maloney were in the first group of women to name named as fellows.

== Career ==
Davis joined the staff of Women’s College Hospital in 1945. Prior to that, she worked for two years at Toronto General Hospital as a clinical teacher. After a period as the assistant head of surgery, she was Chief of Surgery at Women’s College Hospital from 1965 to 1976.

== Retirement and legacy ==
She retired as Chief of Surgery at Women’s College Hospital on June 30, 1976.

Davis died on Saturday May 18, 2002.

== Recognitions and memberships ==
When she received her fellowship from the Royal College of Surgeons in 1947, she became the second woman in Canada to receive a fellowship in general surgery.

During her time at Women’s College Hospital, she became a member of the hospital’s Medical Advisory Committee.
