= Hilda Roberts (physician) =

British physician

- Born: April 1909; Hanley, Stoke-on-Trent, England
- Died: 25 June 1992 (aged 83)
- Education: University of Liverpool (M.D., 1935)
- Occupation: Physician
- Employer(s): Women’s College Hospital, Royal Army Medical Corps, Postgraduate Medical School of London

Hilda Roberts (April 1909 – 25 June 1992) was an English anaesthestist. Roberts was the Associate Chief of Anaesthesia at Toronto’s Women's College Hospital.

== Early life and education ==
Hilda Roberts was born in April 1909 in the town of Hanley in Stoke-on-Trent, England. She attended the University of Liverpool, where she received her MD in 1935. Following her graduation, she spent six years in the Royal Army Medical Corps assisting in the Anesthesia Department, as well as holding resident positions at other English hospitals prior to that. Roberts then joined the Postgraduate Medical School of London where she lectured on Anesthesia from 1949-1953.

== Career ==
In 1957, Hilda Roberts became the Associate Chief of Anaesthesia at Women’s College Hospital. She had a lasting impact on the hospital, conducing multiple research studies, as well as helping further establish the hospital’s Medical Library.

== Works ==
Roberts pioneered numerous research studies in Anesthesia, Spinal Cord Injuries, and Obstetrical Anesthesia that were published a variety of medical journals, including: The Lancet, The Canadian Medical Association Journal, and the Canadian Anaesthetists’ Society Journal.

== Death ==
Hilda Roberts died on 25 June 1992.

== Membership ==
She was a member of several associations, including:

- The Academy of Medicine
- The Royal College of Surgeons in England
- Fellow of the Faculty of Anesthesia
