= Marion Powell =

Canadian physician and activist for sex education and birth control

Marion G. Powell
- Born: December 21, 1923
- Died: December 21, 1997 (aged 74)
- Education: University of Toronto (M.D. 1946; DPH 1962)
- Occupations: Physician, Professor, Medical Missionary
- Years active: 1946-1990
- Employer(s): Women’s College Hospital, Toronto General Hospital, Presbyterian Church of Canada, Scarborough Board of Education, University of Toronto

Marion G. Powell (December 21, 1923 – December 21, 1997) was a Canadian physician and medical missionary. Throughout her life, she earned the title of the "mother of birth control in Canada", because of her work in advocating for sex education and birth control. One of her most notable accomplishments is her contribution to helping open one of the first "municipally funded" clinics for birth control in Ontario in 1966. She is also celebrated for her work at the Women's College Hospital (WCH) Bay Centre for Birth Control where she was the Director from 1981 to 1990.

== Early life and education ==
Marion Powell was born in 1923. She received her medical training from the University of Toronto's medical school where she graduated in 1946. After obtaining her M.D., she began internships at several hospitals – first at Toronto General Hospital in 1947 and then at Women's College Hospital, where she held a senior internship (focusing on obstetrics and gynaecology) until 1948.

== Career ==
Powell then travelled to Timmins, Ontario, for the purpose of starting her own general practice, as well as opening a "home for unwed mothers". After she got married, she worked with the Presbyterian Church of Canada, where her husband was a reverend, as a medical missionary in Osaka, Japan. Once she completed her licensing exams in Japan, she began working at Yodogawa Christian Hospital.

She spent eight years in Japan before returning to Canada in 1960, where she once again opened her own general practice, this time in Scarborough Ontario. In addition to resuming her medical practise, she sought to gain an additional diploma in Public Health from the University of Toronto's School of Hygiene. In that same year, 1962, she began working at the Peel County Health Unit, officially becoming "Canada's first female Medical Officer of Health".

Continuing to work for the municipal government, Powell eventually became the Medical Officer of Health for Scarborough. It was during her time in this role, in 1966, that she "established Canada's first municipally funded birth control clinic". Also during her time working for the municipal government – specially with the Scarborough Board of Education – Powell pioneered new health and sex education curriculum. Her curriculum "became a model for other school boards across the country".

Following that, Dr. Powell joined the Department of Family and Community Medicine at WCH in 1972. While at WCH, she spearheaded the founding of the Bay Centre for Birth Control in 1974 – where she eventually became the Director from 1981 to 1990.

In addition to practising medicine, Powell also advised on legal matters. In 1975 she was appointed by the Privy Council of Canada to a Committee on the Operation of Abortion Law.

Powell also had an active career in higher education, working as an associate professor at the University Toronto's Faculty of Medicine from 1972 to 1988, as well as the Head of the Population Unit at the School of Hygiene (1977). Her lectures focused on sexuality and women's health. She is cited to have "influenced a generation of medical professionals to take a more responsive and caring approach towards the healthcare needs of women".

== Personal life ==
Marion Powell was married to Reverend Donald Powell. The couple had three children.

== Retirement and legacy ==
She retired in 1990 while the Director of the Bay Centre for Birth Control. Marion Powell died in 1997, at the age of 74.

== Awards, recognitions, and memberships ==
In addition to becoming a Fellow of the Royal College of Physicians in Canada, Powell was involved in multiple associations and committees:

1971- 1974: Ontario Medical Association's Advisory Council on Health Education 1971-1973: Curriculum Committee of the Ontario Ministry of Education 1975-1976: Family Planning Services Division for the City of Toronto 1972-1973: President of Planned Parenthood Toronto 1978-1979: President of Planned Parenthood Ontario

Powell has also been awarded several honours:

- 1984: YMCA Woman of Distinction Award
- 1988: Persons Award
- 1990: Order of Canada
- 1994: Gardiner Award

In 1995, Women's College Hospital established the Marion Powell Award to recognize "an individual who has demonstrated leadership, commitment and dedication to the advocacy of women's health over the duration of her or his career".

== Works ==
Powell regularly published her research and advice through numerous academic and non-academic channels. In addition to writing academic articles, and contributing to textbooks, she contributed to a Toronto Star column called "Youth Clinic". She was also the editor of the Canadian Journal of Women's Health Care and the Canadian Journal of OB/GYN and Women's Health Care.
