= Minerva Reid =

Canadian surgeon

- Born: Minerva Ellen Reid; 20 October 1871; Mono, Ontario
- Died: 28 April 1957 (aged 85)
- Education: Ontario Medical College for Women, University of Toronto Faculty of Medicine
- Occupations: Educator, Physician, Politician

Minerva Ellen Reid (20 October 1871 – 28 April 1957) was a teacher, medical doctor, and politician in Toronto, Ontario, Canada. In 1915, Reid became the chief of surgery at Toronto's Women's College Hospital, making her the first woman to hold such a position in North America.

== Background ==
Reid was born on lot 11, 2nd Concession, West, Mono, Ontario, as the 10th of 12 children to John Reid and Margaret Henderson. She went to school at Camilla Public School and Orangeville District Secondary School. An extremely bright student, she passed her entrance exams at age 11 in 1883. After obtaining her teaching certificate she moved to Tillsonburg, Ontario to live with her brother John Buchanan Reid (13 July 1861 - 14 May 1931) who was also a doctor.

While in Tillsonburg, Reid worked as a teacher in the communities of Watford and Tillsonburg. However, living with her brother, she was inspired to become a doctor and soon left teaching to pursue that goal.

She and her sister, Hannah Emily Reid (19 January 1870 - 27 May 1955), attended medical school at the Ontario Medical College for Women in Toronto, graduating together in 1905.

Reid travelled to Dublin, Ireland earning a License in Midwifery, and London, England to complete her training as a surgeon with a membership in the Royal College of Surgeons. When she arrived at the medical school in Dublin on a dark evening she was met by the house doctor who had no idea what to do with this young woman seeking education at the wholly male institution. She had to be bedded down for the night in the school dining room, as there was no other appropriate accommodation.

Reid and her sister, Hannah, worked at Women's College Hospital in Toronto, Ontario, Canada. The sisters both served on the first Board of Directors for the hospital. Reid was Chief of Surgery and her sister was Chief of Anesthesiology. The sisters frequently worked together with Hannah administering the anesthetic while she operated on a patient.

In 1996 Rosa Anthony wrote a one woman play, The League of Notions, based on Minerva’s life.

== Politics and activism ==
=== Sunnybrook Hospital ===
Reid was active in the Suffragette cause, and led several rallies to support the establishment of Sunnybrook Hospital for the care of men wounded in the war. After visiting a hospital Reid discovered wounded soldiers were not receiving proper medical care and as a member of the Toronto Women's Committee she once wrote to Prime Minister Mackenzie King that "the building is old, cockroach-infested and rat-ridden, and sick and wounded men are suffering there needlessly." One such rally held in support of the Sunnybrook Hospital was held at the Royal York Hotel, Toronto in 1944, as Cabinet Minister Ian Mackenzie was staying there. The rally received support from many, and one notable figure present was Lady Flora Eaton.

=== Politics ===
She was politically active and ran provincially in the 1929 Ontario provincial election for High Park district as a Prohibitionist candidate and federally in the 1935 federal election for High Park as a Reconstruction Party of Canada candidate. She also ran twice for the Toronto Board of Control in 1942 and 1943.
