= Ricky Kanee Schachter =

Canadian dermatologist (1918–2007)

- Born: December 23, 1918; Melville, Saskatchewan
- Died: July 1, 2007
- Education: University of Saskatchewan (BA, 1940), University of Toronto (M.D. 1943)
- Occupation: Dermatologist
- Years active: 1943–1985
- Employer(s): Women’s College Hospital, University of Toronto

Ricky Kanee Schachter, FRCP(C), CM (December 23, 1918 – July 1, 2007) was a dermatologist who practiced in the Toronto area, and was invested as a Member of the Order of Canada in 1998, as "a researcher, teacher, administrator and healer, whose work in the areas of skin cancer and psoriasis has improved the lives of her patients, and inspired fellow researchers across Canada."

== Early life, education, and private life ==
Schachter grew up in Melville, Saskatchewan, at a time when women were not generally accepted as professionals in Canada. When she decided to go to university at the age of 16, to become a doctor, even her father, an educated Russian immigrant and community leader, said to her that she would "be taking up a space for a man."

In 1940, she received a Bachelor of Arts degree from the University of Saskatchewan. Schachter then graduated from the University of Toronto's Faculty of Medicine in 1943, and pursued post-graduate training in dermatology at Columbia University in New York from 1944 to 1945. She began working at the Women's College Hospital, in Toronto in 1946 and became a Fellow of the Royal College, in Canada, in 1950. She was appointed associate professor at the University of Toronto's Faculty of Medicine in 1961.

Her husband, Benjamin Schachter, was a Torontonian biochemist, working at the University of Toronto, who, from 1934 to 1939, conducted research on female sex hormones. He isolated and identified conjugated oestrone sulphate (Premarin). Her late brother, Sol Kanee, also received the Order of Canada for his work with the Bank of Canada and the Canadian Jewish Congress.

== Career ==
She began working at Women's College Hospital, in Toronto in 1946 where she was appointed the head of the Division of Dermatology. Schachter became a Fellow of the Royal College of Physicians and Surgeons, in Canada, in 1950. In 1976 she established the Psoriasis Education and Research Centre (PERC) at Women's College Hospital and became its first director. This centre was the first of its kind in Canada to specialize in treatment, education and research on psoriasis.

== Retirement and legacy ==
Schachter retired from her position at Women's College Hospital on June 30, 1985.

A chair in dermatology was established to honour her, and in 1985, the Dr. Ricky Kanee Schachter Dermatology Fund was established in recognition of her commitment to patient care. In July 1991, the Dr. Ricky Kanee Schachter Dermatology Centre opened its doors at Women's College Hospital to treat a variety of skin conditions, through several out-patient clinics:

- The Cosmetic Clinic and Cover FX
- Cosmetic Procedures
- The Dermatology Laser Centre
- General Dermatology
- Dermatology Minor Surgery
- Mohs Clinic
- The Pigmented Lesion Clinic

== Awards and recognitions ==
In addition to being at the forefront of her field, and a pioneer in the treatment of psoriasis on an out-patient basis, Schachter worked for the promotion of women's rights, Jews' rights, and for gender equality in the medical profession. She was a devoted teacher and healer, and received numerous recognitions of her work. With her appointment in 1978 as the president of the Canadian Dermatological Association—the first female in Canada to lead specialists in her field. She was also the first woman to win the Canadian Dermatology Foundation's Practitioner of the Year award, in 2005, and received an honorary Doctor of Laws, by Queen's University, in 2006.

During her time at Women's College Hospital, Schachter was also the president of the medical staff and Medical Advisory Committee from 1958 to 1959.
