= Toronto Metropolitan University Libraries =

Academic library in Toronto, Ontario, Canada

Coordinates: 43.65779°N 79.380716°W

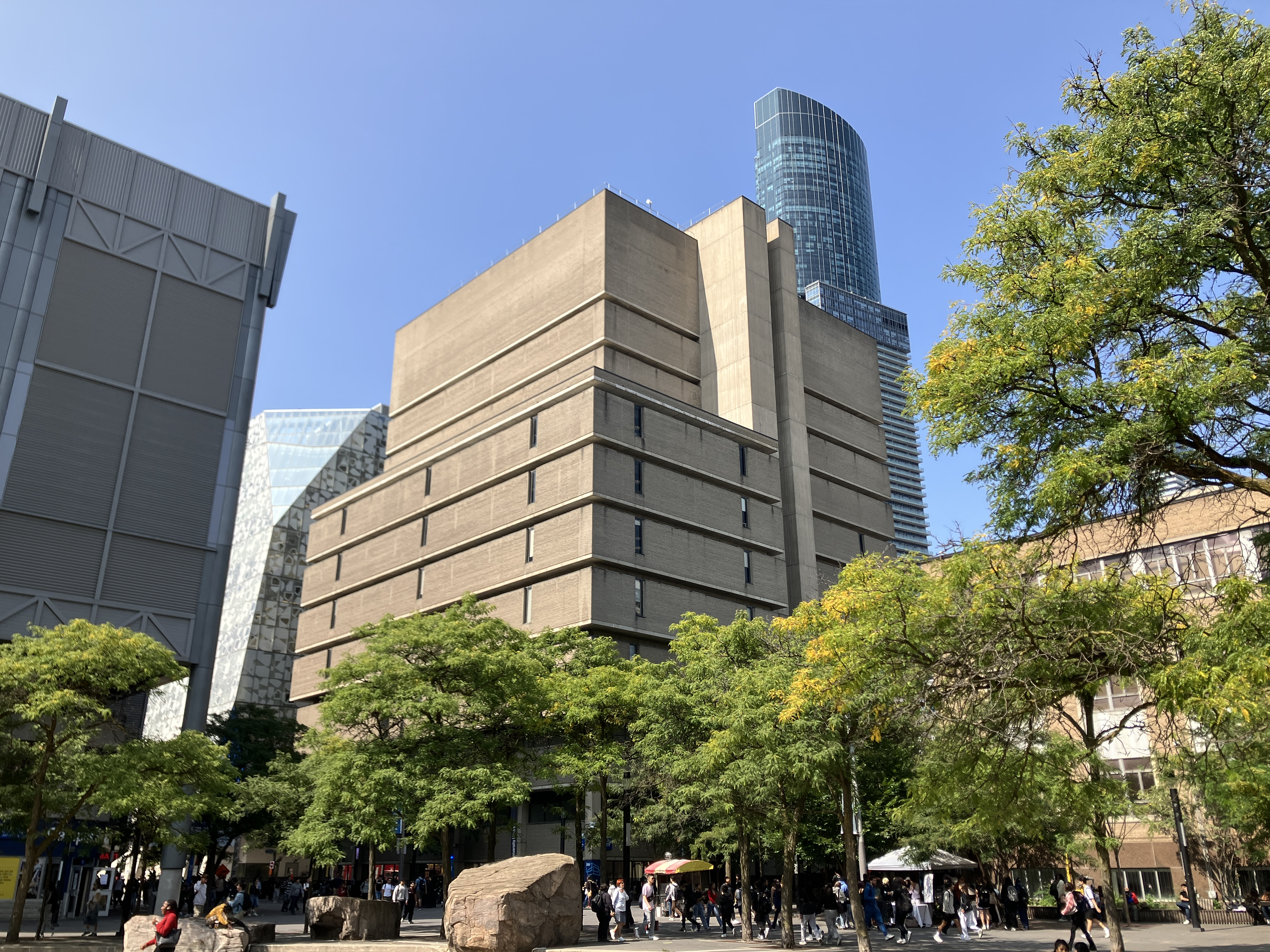
- TMU Library building south east corner, looking from Lake Devo (2024)
- Location: Toronto, Ontario, Canada
- Type: Academic library
- Established: 1974

Collection
- Items collected: Books, journals, newspapers, sound recordings, databases, maps, drawings
- Size: 500,000 books, 3,700 journal titles

Other information
- Director: Mark Robertson
- Website: library.torontomu.ca

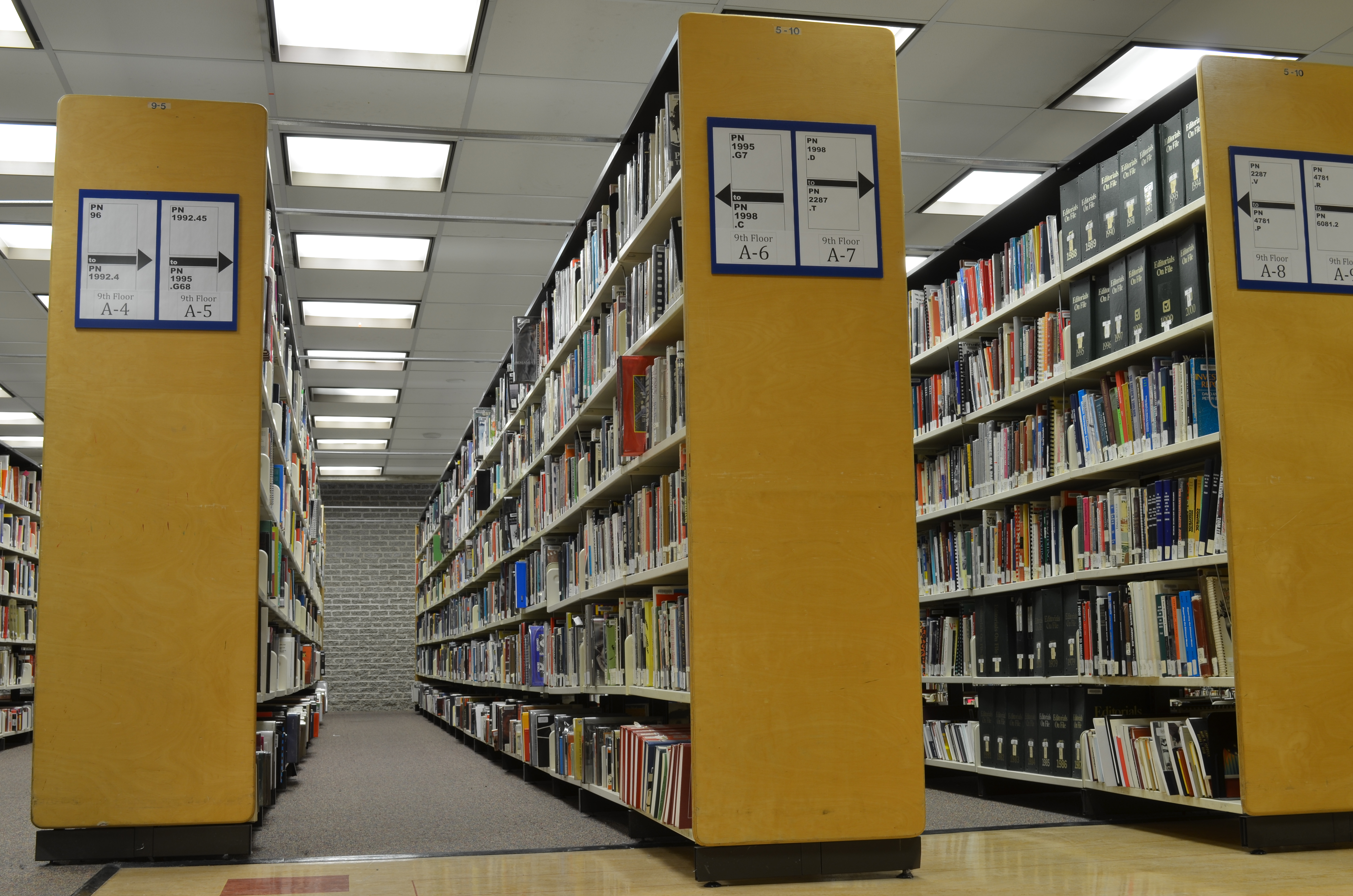
Book stacks on the 9th floor

Toronto Metropolitan University Libraries (formerly Ryerson University Library) are the central academic resource for the students, faculty, and staff of Toronto Metropolitan University, in Toronto, Canada, providing access to extensive collections, resources, information services, and study spaces. The Toronto Metropolitan University Libraries' collection includes over 500,000 books, alongside digital resources consisting of approximately 116,000 e-journals, 500,000 e-books, databases, indexes, geospatial data, and catalogued electronic documents. The Libraries spend more than $5 million annually to support electronic resources and scholarly materials. In 2024, the Libraries transitioned to the Omni shared discovery platform, allowing users to access resources from 19 Ontario university libraries and search a combined collection of more than 25 million print items. Over time, it has grown to become a robust library system that includes the Main Library at 350 Victoria St. and two specialized branch libraries: the Law Library, supporting the Lincoln Alexander School of Law and the Birkam S. Dhillon and Family Medical Library, supporting TMU’s new School of Medicine. The libraries' core mission is to support the teaching, learning, and research activities of the university community. In 2024, the TMU Libraries significantly expanded resource access by implementing the Omni search tool, which provides users with unified discovery and direct access to over 25 million print items held across various academic institutions throughout Ontario. Omni is part of the Ontario Council of University Libraries, Collaborative Futures program– an initiative to increase collaboration and enhance scholarly research opportunities.

== History ==
First operating out of the original Ryerson Hall (Toronto Normal School) building in 1948, the library moved many times as it continued to grow. In the late 1960s, discussions of a library building began, with construction beginning in 1972. The Library building was designed by Webb Zerafa Menkes Housden Partnership and opened in 1974 at the corner of Gould and Victoria. The 11-storey tower is an example of Brutalist architecture.

The library has changed names over the years. First named the Learning Resources Centre in 1974, it then became Ryerson University Library and Archives, and finally TMU Libraries in 2024.

== The Archives and Special Collections ==
The Toronto Metropolitan University Archives and Special Collections are split into two branches. The Archives preserves the university's institutional memory by collecting and preserving primary source materials, including the university's complete administrative, cultural, academic and student history from its origins as the Ryerson Institute of Technology in 1948 to the present day.

The Special Collections was established in 2005 to help support the scholarly research and creative activities of the student body and faculty by acquiring and preserving photography, film, rare books and cultural objects that are of interest to the programs at the university. The holdings include the Kodak Canada Corporate Archives and Heritage Collection, the Grant Collingwood collection, the Jeremy Podeswa Collection, and more.

The Toronto Metropolitan University Archives and Special Collections support students, staff and the general public to gain access to primary source materials and aid them in the research and interpretation of archival objects.
