= Sol Kanee =

Canadian lawyer (1909–2007)

- Born: June 1, 1909; Melville, Saskatchewan
- Died: April 22, 2007 (aged 97); Winnipeg, Manitoba
- Education: University of Manitoba; University of Saskatchewan
- Awards: Order of Canada; Order of Manitoba

Sol Kanee, OC OM (June 1, 1909 – April 22, 2007) was a Canadian lawyer, former president of Canadian Jewish Congress from 1971 to 1974, former chairman of the World Jewish Congress board of governors, the longest-serving member, for 17 years, of the board of governors of the Bank of Canada, and chairman of the Federal Business Development Bank, 1975–78.

== Biography ==
Born in Melville, Saskatchewan, he received a Bachelor of Arts degree from the University of Manitoba in 1929 and a Bachelor of Law degree from the University of Saskatchewan in 1932. He was called to Bar of Saskatchewan in 1933. From 1933 to 1940, he practised law in Melville, Saskatchewan with the law firm Kanee & Deroche. During World War II, he served with the Canadian Army in Europe and the South Pacific. He was discharged with the rank of Major. He and his wife Florence had one son, Stephen, now resident in Minneapolis.

After the war, he practised law in Winnipeg, Manitoba with the law firm, Shinbane, Dorfman & Kanee, until 1965. He was the owner and President of Soo Line Mills, which he took over after his father's death, and several other businesses in Winnipeg. Under his supervision, in 1955, the Soo Line Milling Company switched from conveyor belt operation to a pneumatic drive; this was the first flour mill to make this switch in the Western hemisphere.

In addition to his national and international contributions, Sol Kanee worked hard to improve his city, Winnipeg. There, he chaired the Community Welfare Planning Council, and worked tirelessly for a variety of organisations, including the Society for Crippled Children and Adults, the United Way, the Royal Winnipeg Ballet (which he helped lift from obscurity), the board of governors of the University of Manitoba (of which he was chair) and the Sharon Home.

Sol Kanee devoted much of his energy toward improving the status of Jews around the world. He rose through the ranks to become president of the Canadian Jewish Congress from 1971 to 1974, and worked on the executive of the World Jewish Congress. He passionately supported and advocated on behalf of the state of Israel, and using his connections in Canadian politics, he convinced C.D. Howe not only to sell arms to Israel, but to do so at discounted rates; he later procured planes and cargo to supply relief to the young country. His other, international humanitarian projects included fighting to secure reparations from Germany and persuading the Russian government to ease its restriction on Russian Jews emigrating to Israel.

Sol Kanee's immense contributions to Winnipeg, Manitoba, Canada and the world earned him several important distinctions, including the Centennial of Canada Medal in 1967, an Honorary Doctor of Laws from the University of Manitoba in 1974, the Canadian Jewish Congress Samuel Bronfman Medal in 1978, the International B'nai Brith Humanitarian Award in 1979 and the Nahum Goldmann Medal in 1995. The Winnipeg Jewish Community Council created the Sol Kanee Distinguished Service Medal in 1994, his long-time friend Arthur Mauro founded the Sol Kanee Lecture on International Peace and Justice in 2002, and the Jewish Heritage Centre of Western Canada created the Sol & Florence Kanee Distinguished Lecture Series in 2004.

He was made an Officer of the Order of Canada in 1977 and was awarded the Order of Manitoba for his "unparalleled record of service to Winnipeg and Canada’s Jewish community" in 2000. His sister, Dr. Ricky Kanee Schachter has also received the Order of Canada.

Preceded by Monroe Abbey	President of the Canadian Jewish Congress; 1971–1974	Succeeded by Sydney Harris
