= Grant Collingwood =

Canadian photographer

Harold Grant Collingwood (August 4, 1909 – May 26, 1996) was a Canadian photographer who captured Toronto and its environs from the 1940s - 1990s. The majority of his photographic work is housed at the Toronto Metropolitan University Archives and Special Collections, and some of his photographic prints are in the Miss Margaret Robins Archives of Women's College Hospital. Collingwood used multiple different cameras throughout in his artistic career including a Graphic View Camera, Rolleiflex, Lecia Visoflex 2, Super Ikonta, and Paillard Bolex movie camera.

== Early life ==
Collingwood was born in the municipality of South Huron in the community of Exeter located approximately 40 kilometres north of London, Ontario to William Thomas Collingwood and Laura Pansy Camelia Prouty-Collingwood. He was one of four children, he had one brother, Russell Collingwood and two sisters, Vivian and Ruth Collingwood.

He spent his childhood in Exeter. In the 1930s, he temporarily resided as a patient at the Queen Alexandra Sanitarium due to a tuberculosis illness. Following his recovery, he moved to Toronto, Ontario where he lived for several decades in various parts of the city including Centre Island, The Annex and Davisville Village.

== Career ==
Collingwood was a contract photographer who worked on commission with clients such as Maclean-Hunter and Chatelaine Magazine. He also captured street views of Toronto's architecture, furniture design, manufacturers and machinery, and public events such as the Canadian National Exhibition (CNE). Additionally, Collingwood photographed Toronto's nightlife of jazz musicians, and was press for The Cradle Club fundraisers at Women's College Hospital. As a result of photographing a substantial amount of Toronto, Collingwood also managed to capture much of men and women's fashion from the 1940s to the 1990s.

In 2021, a donation of Collingwood's photography was made to Toronto Metropolitan University Archives and Special Collections. The collection consists of approximately 35854 photographs (31788 negatives, 4066 prints), one 16mm film, 8 photo albums and approximately 303 textual records including family letters, cards, and personal records.

== Photographic style ==
Collingwood's photographs can be described as vernacular photography, portraiture, commercial, documentary, and historical. Some formats he used include medium format, 35mm film, sheet film, and motion picture film.

== Jazz photography ==
Photographing jazz musicians spanned decades of Collingwood's career. Some jazz musicians he photographed include Jay McShann, Warren Vache, and Clark Terry, at venues such as The Brunswick House, Scarboro Centre, Traders Lounge, and Harbourfront. Some musical instruments he featured included the trumpet, saxophone, drums, bass violin, and singers. His photographs were published in The Jazz Exiles by Bill Moody.

== Death ==
Collingwood died on May 26, 1996 in Toronto, Ontario. He is buried with his family at the Exeter Cemetery.
