= Sydney Harris (judge) =

Sydney Malcolm Harris (June 23, 1917 – January 17, 2009) was a Canadian jurist and civil liberties advocate who worked as a lawyer, both for the federal government and then in private practice for over 30 years before being appointed to the Ontario Provincial Court in 1976.

== Early life and education ==
He was the grandson of Jewish immigrants who immigrated to Canada from the Russian Empire in the 1880s. His father owned a dressmaking business and raised Sydney and his sister in their Yorkville Avenue home in Toronto. Harris won a scholarship as a student of Jarvis Collegiate Institute and attended the University of Toronto before enrolling in Osgoode Hall Law School in 1939.

== Early career ==
During World War II, Harris tried to enlist but was rejected due to poor eyesight. Instead, he went to Ottawa and became a lawyer for the government. Following the war, he returned to Toronto to practice for private law firms before opening his own practice in 1950. As a lawyer and activist he lobbied for the adoption of the Ontario Human Rights Code in 1962, as well as amendments to the Criminal Code in the 1960s against hate speech. He also lobbied against capital punishment and public funding for religious schools saying "I see no justification for the use of my tax money to teach Protestantism to Protestant children than I would see for the use of Anglican or Roman Catholic tax money to teach Judaism to Jewish children." Harris was a supporter of and fundraiser for the US civil rights movement and met with Martin Luther King Jr. three times in 1963.

== Ontario Provincial Court career ==
As a judge, Harris was nicknamed Syd Vicious for his heavy sentences. "If there was a reasonable doubt in a case, Syd would find it. But if he found you guilty, the penalties tended to be higher than most judges," said Toronto lawyer Clayton Ruby. "It's the way he looked at the world. He wanted to make sure he didn't convict anyone who was innocent but, at the same time, he didn't like criminals. He liked justice but not criminals."

Notable rulings include his landmark 1979 acquittal of the gay magazine Body Politic and its publishers, Pink Triangle Press of obscenity, his 1988 decision to imprison NHL player Dino Ciccarelli for his on-ice attack of Toronto Maple Leaf Luke Richardson and his 1983 decision to acquit furrier Paul Magder for violating the law against Sunday shopping by opening his store.

== Later years ==
He retired from the criminal court in 1992, but later became a Small Claims Court judge and also served in his later years as a member of the Ontario Assessment Review Board, referee for the Law Society of Upper Canada and an appointee of the Council for the Association of Ontario Land Surveyors.

== Personal life ==
He was a prominent opponent of the neo-Nazi movement in the 1960s. At a time when the Jewish community was reticent to publicly oppose anti-Semites, he stood before a congregation of 1,500 at a Toronto's Beth Tzedec Synagogue and read out the names and addresses of three prominent Toronto neo-Nazis and their supporters.

He was active in the Jewish community and served as president of the Canadian Council of Reform Congregations in the 1960s, and as national president of the Canadian Jewish Congress from 1974 to 1977.

Preceded by Sol Kanee	President of the Canadian Jewish Congress; 1974–1977	Succeeded by W. Gunther Plaut
