= Hannah Emily Reid =

Canadian doctor (1970–1955)

- Born: January 19, 1870; Orangeville, Ontario, Canada
- Died: May 27, 1955 (aged 85)
- Education: Attended Ontario Medical College for Women but graduated from the University of Toronto’s Faculty of Medicine (1905)
- Occupation: Physician
- Employer(s): New England Hospital for Women and Children, Women’s College Hospital

Hannah Emily Reid (January 19, 1870 – May 27, 1955) was a Canadian physician. She was the Chief of Anaesthesia at Toronto's Women's College Hospital from 1926 to 1931.

== Early life and education ==
Hannah Emily Reid was born near Orangeville, Ontario on January 19, 1870. From an early age she had an interest in teaching– after completing her studies at Orangeville High School in 1891 she received her Second-Class Teacher's Certificate and began teaching at several schools in Toronto.

She later discovered her interest in medicine and joined the Ontario Medical College for Women. Hannah and her sister, Minerva Reid “were amongst the last women to graduate from the Ontario Medical College for Women before it closed in 1905”. While she attended the Ontario Medical College for Women in Toronto until its closure, she completed her medical degree at the University of Toronto’s Faculty of Medicine in 1905. After graduating, Reid travelled to northern Manitoba on medical assignment. Following that, she spent 1906 as an intern at the New England Hospital for Women and Children.

== Career ==
In 1912, Reid opened her own practice in Toronto, which focused on anesthesia and obstetrics. Two years later, she began working at Women’s College Hospital in the Department of Anaesthesia. She became Chief of Anaesthesia in 1926, the second woman to hold this position after Margaret McCallum-Johnston. According to the hospital, “[f]or over two decades, the two sisters could often be found working together in the operating rooms of Women's College Hospital”. During her career at Women's College Hospital, Hannah was also a member of the hospital's first Board of Directors.

Reid died in Toronto, Ontario on May 27, 1955. and her sister died in 1957.
