= Helen Bell Milburn =

Canadian radiologist

- Born: October 18, 1887; London, Ontario, Canada
- Died: September 21, 1986 (aged 98)
- Education: University of Toronto (BA, 1911; M.D., 1919)
- Occupation: Radiologist
- Years active: 1919–1954
- Employer(s): Women’s College Hospital, Bellevue Hospital, Toronto General Hospital

Helen Bell Milburn (October 18, 1887 – September 21, 1986) was a Canadian radiologist. She was on the staff of the Department of Radiology at Toronto’s Women's College Hospital from 1923 to 1954 and the Chairman of the hospital’s Breast Cancer Research Committee.

== Early life and education ==
Milburn was born on October 18, 1887, in London, Ontario. She attended the University of Toronto where she completed a BA in 1911 and an M.D. in 1919. After obtaining her medical degree, she travelled to Bellevue Hospital in New York City where she received further training on X-rays. By 1922 she had returned to Canada to join the Toronto General Hospital where she would study radiation therapy until 1923.

== Career ==
Milburn joined the staff of Women's College Hospital in 1923. She specialized in radiology and was appointed as the Assistant Chief of Radiology. She also became a fellow of the Royal College of Physicians and Surgeons in 1947.

During her time at Women’s College Hospital, Milburn helped pioneer breast cancer research. In 1939, the hospital formed a Breast Cancer Research Committee, where Milburn was appointed the chair. The committee, in 1945, then established “one of the earliest long-term breast cancer studies in Canada” This study lasted for several decades and had over 4000 participants–mostly nursing students from the Women’s College Hospital School of Nursing and other schools. The purpose of the study was to “develop a profile of women who are most likely to develop breast cancer”. The study focused on several factors which included: body weight, breast size, overall health, family history of breast cancer, smoking and other lifestyle factors.Even though this study was scheduled to conclude in the 1960s, participants continued to send health data to the hospital into the 1980s.

== Retirement and legacy ==
While Women's College Hospital's breast cancer study continued well into the 1980s, Milburn retired from her position at the hospital in 1954. However, according to her obituary in the Toronto Star even after her retirement “she maintained an active interest in breast cancer research at the hospital”.

Milburn died on September 21, 1986.

== Personal life ==
In 1924, she married Clement Milburn. The couple enjoyed travelling and visited several places, including Australia, Europe and the United States. The couple had one son.
