= West Digges =

English actor

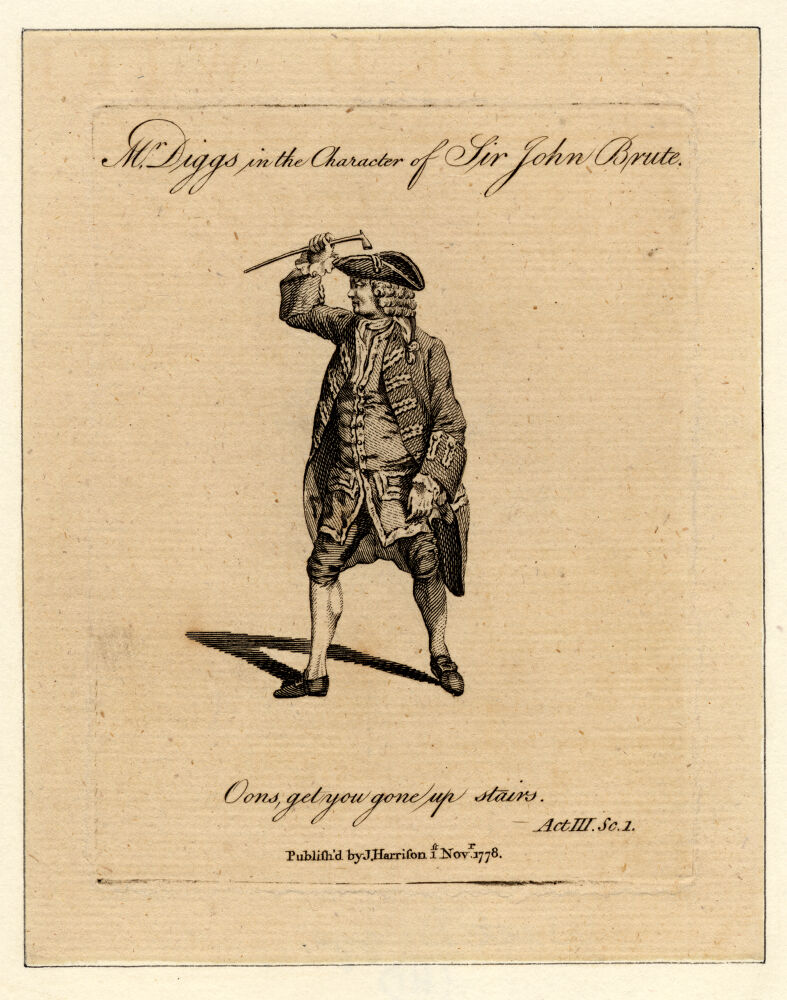
West Digges playing Sir John Brute in The Provoked Wife

West Digges (1720–1786) was an English actor who made his first stage appearance in Dublin in 1749 as Jaffier in Venice Preserv'd; and both there and in Edinburgh until 1764 he acted in many tragic roles with success. He was the original "young Norval" in John Home's Douglas (1756). His first London appearance was as Cato at the Haymarket Theatre in 1777, and he afterwards played King Lear, Macbeth, Shylock and Wolsey.

He was a friend and associate of James Boswell who much admired him.

He created the title role in the opera The Baron Kinkvervankotsdorsprakingatchdern. In 1781 he returned to Dublin and retired in 1784.

The actress Fanny Fleming was said to be a granddaughter.
