= Jessie Gray =

Canadian surgeon and researcher (1910–1978)

- Born: August 26, 1910; Augusta, Georgia, United States
- Died: October 16, 1978 (aged 68)
- Education: University of Toronto (B.Sc. 1931; M.D. 1934; Ch.M. 1939)
- Occupations: Surgeon, lecturer, teacher, researcher
- Years active: 1939–1965
- Employer(s): Toronto General Hospital, St Mary's Hospital (Manchester), Women's College Hospital, University of Toronto
- Title: Canada's First Lady of Surgery

Jessie Catherine Gray (August 26, 1910 – October 16, 1978) was a Canadian cancer surgeon, educator, and researcher. Known as the Canadian "First Lady of Surgery", Gray is described as a trailblazer for women surgeons and an example that women could excel in the male-dominated field of general surgery. During her career, she was considered one of the top four cancer surgeons in North America, and she earned many firsts and fellowships in her field.

== Early life and education ==
Gray was born in Augusta, Georgia, United States, on August 26, 1910. When she was two years old, her family moved to Toronto, Ontario, Canada, where she was schooled and lived and worked for the rest of her life. As an undergraduate at the University of Toronto, she became a member of the sorority Alpha Delta Pi. She also served as president of the medical women's organization for undergraduates, participated in sports such as tennis and hockey, and won a scholarship for "all-round competence". In 1931, she obtained her Bachelor of Science with honors from the university and continued there to obtain her Doctor of Medicine in 1934. The Faculty of Medicine awarded her the gold medal for highest academic standing of her graduating class; she was the first woman to receive this medal.

== Career ==
According to the registry of the Royal College of Physicians and Surgeons of Canada, Gray was the first female general surgeon registered in the country (however, Jennie Smillie Robertson was the first recorded female surgeon in Canada; hospitals did not accept female surgeons at the time of Robertson's career). She completed two internships at the Toronto General Hospital before re-entering the University of Toronto in 1936, as the first woman accepted to its prestigious Gallie Course in surgery. In 1939, she was the first Canadian woman to graduate with a Master of Surgery.

Gray returned to work with another year-long internship, this time at St Mary's Hospital in Manchester, England. She returned to Toronto in 1940 to take a surgical residency at Toronto General Hospital, where she had previously interned; now, she became their first female resident surgeon. Next, she entered the position of Associate Surgeon-in-Chief at the Women's College Hospital in 1941 and rose to Chief of Surgery in 1946. While there, she was considered one of the four top cancer surgeons in North America and aided in the creation of the first cancer detection clinic in Canada.

Beginning in 1941, Gray taught as a clinical teacher of surgery at her alma mater, the University of Toronto, in its faculty of medicine. In 1953, her appointment changed so that she became an associate professor, then an assistant professor in 1964. She was also involved in the University of Toronto Faculty of Dentistry.

Gray's career was noted for multiple firsts for women surgeons; aside from those she accomplished in her education, she was awarded fellowships to multiple colleges of surgeons.

== Retirement and legacy ==
In 1964, Gray retired from the Women's College Hospital, and a year later, in 1965, she retired from the University of Toronto. Throughout her career, she had published in multiple journals, mostly on the subject of gastrointestinal tract surgery, and co-wrote a chapter on colon surgery for one of Warren Henry Cole's surgery textbooks. After her retirement, she continued her involvement in science, becoming a fellow and member of several more organizations.

Gray's obituary in the Canadian Medical Association Journal describes her as "dynamic, cheerful, and forthright with a great sense of realism and self-discipline", and states that these attributes helped her cope with a long illness that eventually led to her death on October 16, 1978, at the Women's College Hospital. After her death, parties connected to Gray set up a memorial fund in her name, which would help fund the creation of the Jessie Gray Colorectal Unit for early detection of colorectal cancer, located at her longtime workplace.

== Awards, recognitions, and memberships ==
Listed are notable awards, memberships, fellowships, and other recognitions Gray has received:

- 1934 – first woman to receive the University of Toronto Faculty of Medicine's gold medal for academic standing
- 1939 – first Canadian woman to obtain a Master of Surgery
- 1941 – first woman awarded a fellowship from the Royal College of Physicians and Surgeons of Canada
- 1946 – first woman to become Chief of Surgery
- 1948 – first woman to join the Central Surgical Society of North America
- 1951 – awarded a fellowship from the American College of Surgeons; in 1952, she became their first woman speaker at an annual congress
- 1966 – first woman elected as a member of the Science Council of Canada
- 1968 – became a Life Fellow of the Academy of Medicine
- 1973 – awarded Civic Award of Merit by David Crombie, then mayor of Toronto

For International Women's Day in 2017, the Canadian Medical Association recognized Gray, among others, as one of the women who had had an enormous effect on their profession.

== See also ==
- Emily Stowe
- Jennie Smillie Robertson
