= Margaret McKellar =

Canadian medical missionary

Margaret McKellar (23 October 1861 – 24 August 1941) was a Canadian medical missionary. She was the first medical missionary at Neemuch, India, where she founded a hospital. She was also the founder of Knox Church Missionary Society in Calgary. She was decorated by King George V for her work in India.

== Early years and education ==
Margaret McKellar was born on the Isle of Mull, Scotland, 23 October 1861. She was the daughter Captain Peter McKellar of Port Elgin, Ontario. She came to Canada in early childhood.

McKellar was educated in public schools, and Ingersoll High School. She received her M.D. from Queen's University in 1890. She furthered her education at Woman's Medical College (now Women's College Hospital), and with post-graduate studies in Edinburgh and London.

== Career ==
McKellar became a member of the College of Physicians and Surgeons of Ontario, in 1890, and in that year, went to Central India as a medical missionary of the Presbyterian Church in Canada, locating as the first medical missionary at Neemuch, where she founded a hospital which was of great benefit to that region. She took an active part in the famine relief work at that place.

McKellar was a frequent contributor to missionary and secular press on missionary and other Indian topics. On a home visit in 1898, she addressed the General Assembly of the Presbyterian Church, at Montreal. She was the author of A Trip Into Kashmir, 1907.

She retired in 1930.

== Selected works ==
- A Trip Into Kashmir, 1907
