= Fanny Fleming =

English actress

Fanny Fleming, afterwards Mrs. Stanley (c. 1796–1861), was an English actress.

== Life ==
Fleming was born, according to Oxberry's Dramatic Chronology, 31 October 1796, but more probably four years earlier. She is said to have been a granddaughter of West Digges. In Liverpool and Manchester she played Lady Macbeth, Helen McGregor in Terry's stage adaptation of Rob Roy, and other characters. She married George Stanley, a low comedian, who went to America in October 1834, and there died.

Mrs. Stanley's first appearance in London took place at the Lyceum, assumably near the same date. She is chiefly remembered in connection with the Haymarket Theatre, where she played old women both in comedy and tragedy. She was a tall, well-built woman, and seems to have been a fine actress. Her daughter, Emma Stanley, born 13 November 1823, made her first appearance at the Lyceum, in May 1843. Mrs. Stanley died suddenly of bronchitis in Jermyn Street, 17 January 1861, at the reputed age of sixty-nine years.
