= Women's College Hospital =

Hospital in Toronto, Ontario, Canada

Coordinates: 43.661686°N 79.387497°W

Geography
- Location: 76 Grenville Street; Toronto, Ontario, Canada

Organization
- Care system: Public Medicare (Canada) (OHIP)
- Type: Teaching
- Affiliated university: University of Toronto
- Network: TAHSN

Services
- Emergency department: No
- Speciality: Women's Health

History
- Founded: 1883 (Original Site, as Women's Medical College) 1911 (Second Site, as Women's College Hospital and Dispensary) 1915 (Third Site, as Women's College Hospital and Dispensary) 1935 (Current Site, Renovated 2015)
- Closed: 1911 (Original Site) 1915 (Second Site) 1935 (Third Site)

Links
- Website: www.womenscollegehospital.ca
- Lists: Hospitals in Canada

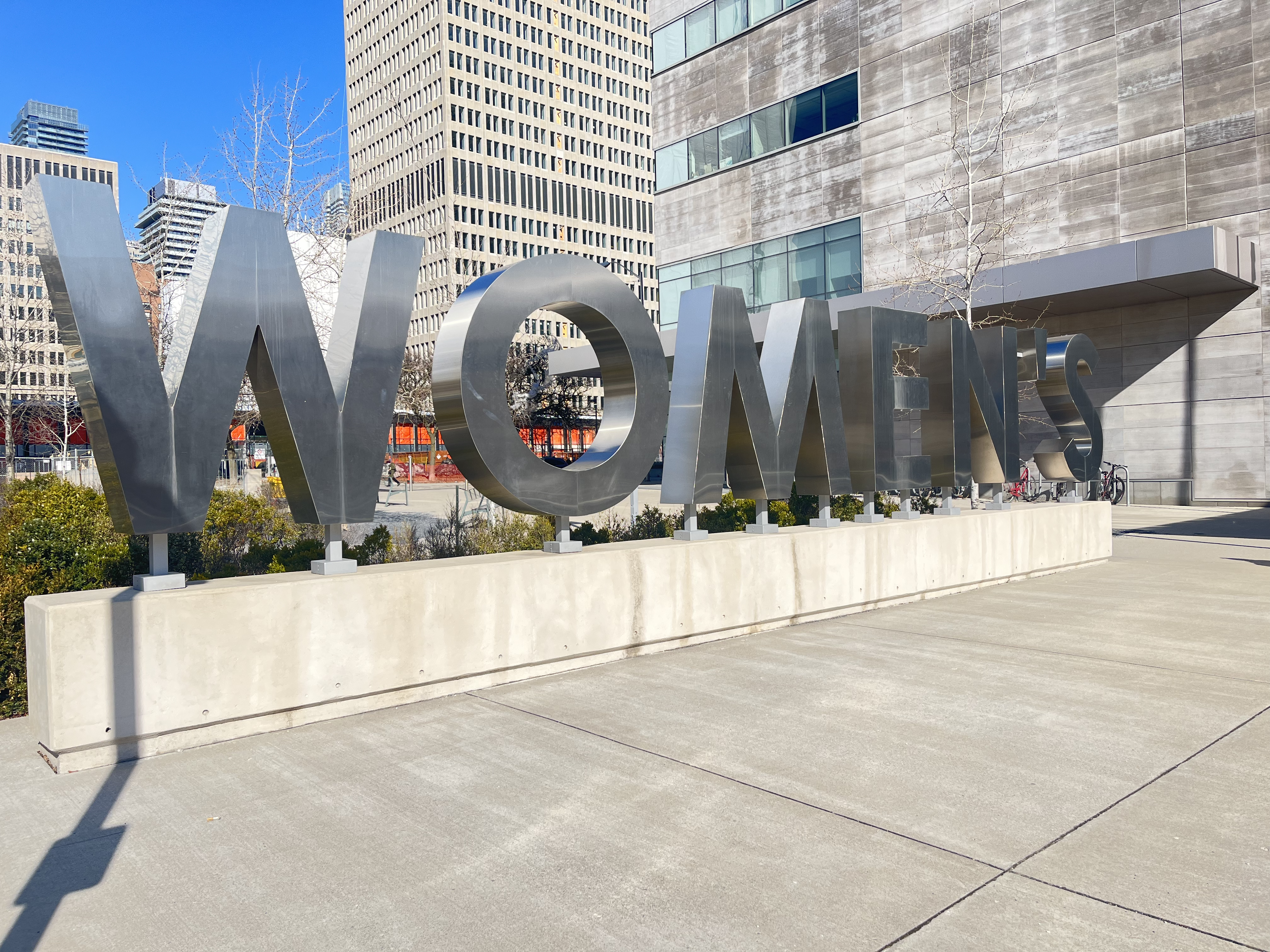
"Women's" sign added outside front entrance as part of 2015 renovations.

Women's College Hospital is a teaching hospital in Toronto, Ontario, Canada. It is located in downtown Toronto at the north end of Hospital Row, a section of University Avenue where several major hospitals are located. It currently functions as an independent ambulatory care hospital and member of the Toronto Academic Health Science Network (TAHSN) affiliated with the University of Toronto.

Women's College Hospital maintains a focus on women's health, research in women's health, and ambulatory care, although patients of all genders can access most services offered by the hospital. It was recognized as the only collaborating centre in women's health the Western Hemisphere designated by the World Health Organization.

Women's College Hospital is associated with Women's College Research Institute, Women's College Hospital Foundation and Women's Health Matters, a bilingual consumer website on women's health and lifestyle issues.

== History ==
Women's College Hospital began as Woman's Medical College in 1883. On June 13, 1883, Dr. Emily Stowe (1831–1903) the second woman licensed to practice medicine in Canada – led a group of her supporters to a meeting at the Toronto Women's Suffrage Club, stating "that medical education for women is a recognized necessity, and consequently facilities for such instruction should be provided." The motion was seconded adding "that the establishment of such a school was a public necessity and in the interests of the community."

Less than six months after this meeting, on October 1, 1883, Toronto Mayor A.R. Boswell formally opened Woman's Medical College.

=== Women's College Hospital leaders ===
- Dr. Jessie Gray – considered at the time to be one of the top cancer surgeons in North America, she was the first woman to earn a Master of Surgery degree in Canada
- Dr. Marion Powell – a leader in raising consciousness in women's sexual health
- Dr. Henrietta Banting – spearheaded the use of mammography
- Dr. Anna Marion Hilliard – collaborated in the development of a simplified Pap test
- Dr. Ricky Kanee Schachter – was the first woman to lead an academic division of dermatology
- Dr. Minerva Reid – was the first female Chief of Surgery in North America

=== Ontario Medical College for Women ===
In 1895, the College amalgamated with its sister institution in Kingston, Ontario, and changed its name to the Ontario Medical College for Women. A practical experience clinic called the Dispensary was opened in Toronto in 1898. The clinic allowed female patients to obtain the services of women doctors in a field dominated by men. At the time, services were provided regardless of the patient's ability to pay and medical advice was always free.

In 1906, the University of Toronto opened its doors to permit women to study medicine, and the Ontario Medical College for Women closed. The Dispensary remained open and continued to prosper in the city.

=== Recent history ===
Women's College Hospital moved to its current location in Toronto in 1935, and became a teaching hospital affiliated with the University of Toronto in 1961. Later, the hospital merged with Sunnybrook Hospital and the Orthopedic and Arthritic Hospital in 1998 under the provisions of Ontario Bill 51, becoming Sunnybrook and Women's College Health Sciences Centre. The hospital's Urgent Care Centre was named in honour of Dr. Burnett M. Thall, a longtime member of its board of directors. In 2006, they de-amalgamated and Women's College Hospital reverted to its original name. During the SARS outbreak of 2003, while still part of the erstwhile "Sunnybrook and Women's College Health Sciences Centre", the Women's College site housed the first ambulatory SARS clinic in Canada. Meanwhile, the Sunnybrook site housed both the first in-patient SARS unit and Intensive Care Unit for SARS in Canada.

The hospital was designated a National Historic Site of Canada in 1995. A plaque was erected by Historic Sites and Monuments Board of Canada at the Women's College Hospital, Grenville St., Toronto.

Women's College Hospital has earned a distinctive place in Canadian medical history. From its beginnings as a small out-patient clinic in 1898 to its development as a modern teaching hospital, the institution symbolizes the struggle of women to claim their place in the medical profession. It offered them opportunities in teaching and in hospital practice, which were often unavailable or extremely limited elsewhere in the country. The hospital has made innovative contributions to the treatment and diagnosis of disease through its vital focus on health issues affecting women and families.

Canadian Prime Minister Justin Trudeau visited the hospital on March 7, 2024.

=== The Miss Margaret Robins Archives ===
The Miss Margaret Robins Archives of Women's College Hospital is located within the hospital campus. The archive acquires, preserves and makes publicly accessible historical records of the institution. This includes textual records, photographs, slides, audio, video recording, medical equipment and textiles concerning the documentation of the history of the hospital and its community.

Archival holdings consist of the documentation of charities and departments in the history of the hospital. This includes documentation of the Cradle Club, which was established to help mothers and newborn babies. The Department of Obstetrics and Gynaecology, one of the first departments at the hospital. The Brief Psychotherapy Centre for Women, a department dedicated to women's mental well being, and additional holdings concerning the hospitals advancements in women's health. Their collection also contains historic photographs of their community events and fundraising for the Cradle Club which were taken by the prominent Toronto photographer Grant Collingwood.

== About ==
Women's College Hospital collaborated in the invention of the simplified Pap test, opened Ontario's first regional Sexual Assault Care Centre and was the first hospital in the province to use mammography as a diagnostic tool to detect breast cancer. As of 2012, it is Ontario's first and only independent ambulatory care centre. Ambulatory care refers to surgeries, diagnostic procedures and treatments that do not require overnight hospitalization. That means patients can be released within 18 hours, and can recover at home.

== Complex ==
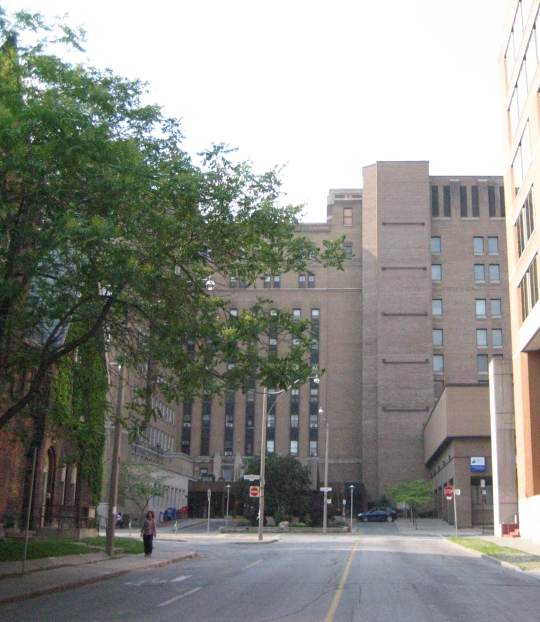
Original buildings on current site, demolished and replaced by a single new building in 2015.

WCH's current site consisted of three wings built in 1935, 1956 and 1971 which were all demolished as part of a complete rebuild which was completed in 2015.

The 1935 wing was a 10-storey Art Deco building that was torn down despite historical designation for WCH.

== Education ==
Women's College Hospital is a teaching hospital affiliated with the University of Toronto. Research at the hospital, university and research institute are focused around sex and gender differences in physiology and social roles, which cause women to have different health-care needs than men.

WCH received a $500,000 grant from the Public Health Agency of Canada's Immunization Partnership Fund to implement a vaccine education program targeted towards non-physician health care workers in long-term facilities and at-home care services.

== Research ==
The Women's College Research Institute (WCRI) is the only one of its kind at a Canadian hospital devoted to women's health. International researchers study breast cancer, musculoskeletal health, older women's health and the impact of violence on women's lives.

WCRI scientist Dr. Steven Narod was part of the team that discovered the BRCA1 and BRCA2 genes as breast cancer risks– one of the most important breakthroughs in cancer research. He has changed the way international health professionals understand and test for genes associated with breast and ovarian cancer.

== Treatment/clinics ==
- After Cancer Treatment Transition Clinic: Women's College Hospital and Princess Margaret Hospital created Canada's only After Cancer Treatment Transition Clinic (ACTT) to address the health-care needs of cancer survivors.
- Virtual Ward: With funding from the Toronto Central Local Health Institution and the Ontario Ministry of Health and Long-Term Care, several hospitals have partnered with the Toronto Central Community Care Access Centre to create the first virtual ward in North America. The Virtual Ward uses a health team to work with patients who cannot come to the hospital on a regular basis.
- CACE Complex Care Clinic: In collaboration with the University of Toronto, Women's College Hospital built a Centre for Ambulatory Care and Education (CACE) Complex Care Clinic. The clinic opened in 2015 and will focus on providing ambulatory care. It will use an interdisciplinary approach to medicine.
- Bay Centre for Birth Control: The Bay Centre specializes in sexual and reproductive health care for women in Ontario. Services include contraceptive health care, reproductive health care, abortion care, sexual health care, and colonoscopy services. It is located near the main hospital at 790 Bay Street, Toronto.

== Women's College Hospital timeline ==
Date	Event
1883	Woman's Medical College opens
1911	Women's College Hospital and Dispensary opens: a seven-bed hospital where medically trained women could practise medicine.
1947	Collaborated in the development of the simplified Pap test for detecting early symptoms of cancer, particularly of the cervix.
1948	Opening of the first Cancer Detection Clinic in Ontario
1963	WCH became the first hospital in Ontario to use mammography as a diagnostic tool to detect breast cancer.
1971	WCH partnered with the Tri-Hospital Diabetes Education Centre, Canada's first comprehensive teaching program in an ambulatory setting for people with diabetes.
1971	The first Perinatal Intensive Care Unit in Canada opens at WCH.
1973	Opening of the Bay Centre for Birth Control, the first hospital-supported walk-in clinic.
1976	Psoriasis Education and Research Centre opens – the first centre in Canada to place emphasis on self-care treatment.
1977	Henrietta Banting Breast Centre opens – a treatment, education and research centre for breast disease.
1981	Perinatal Intensive Care Unit was declared the Regional High-Risk Pregnancy Unit - The first of its kind in Canada.
1984	WCH opens the first regional Sexual Assault Care Centre in Ontario.
1987	Urgent Care Centre opens – the first of its kind in Ontario.
1987	Established the Brief Psychotherapy Centre for Women, the first outpatient therapy program in Canada.
1988	Regional Women's Health Centre opens.
1988	WCH delivered the first test-tube quintuplets in Canada.
1991	Ricky Kanee Schachter Dermatology Centre opens – Centre opens to pursue dermatological research, education and patient care.
1991	The first colorectal cancer clinic in Toronto was launched by WCH (U of T Jessie Gray Colorectal Clinic)
1994	Opening of the first multidisciplinary osteoporosis clinic of its kind in Canada.
1995	WCH was designated a World Health Organization Collaborating Centre in Women's Health, the first in the hemisphere.
1996	Opening of the Environmental Health Clinic, the only one of its kind in Ontario.
1996	Establishment of Canada's first cardiac prevention and rehabilitation program designed exclusively for women (Women's Cardiovascular Health Initiative).
2000	Creation of www.womenshealthmatters.ca, the first hospital-based consumer health information website for women.
2001	Response Centre and the 23-Hour Day Unit open.
2002	Labyrinth opens – Canada's first and only hospital-based labyrinth.
2003	The first SARS Assessment Clinic in Canada opens (Women's College ACC).
2006	WCH became Ontario's only academic ambulatory hospital with a primary focus on women's health as it begins operating independently under the Public Hospitals Act.
2008	Completed Canada's first breast implant reconstruction in a single stage.
2009	Opening of the Centre for Headache, Ontario's only hospital-based headache centre.

== See also ==
- Elizabeth Bagshaw
- Margaret McKellar
- Helen Bell Milburn
- Hannah Emily Reid
- Ricky Kanee Schachter
- Emily Stowe
- Marjorie Davis
