= Gynecological surgery =

Surgery on the female reproductive system

- MeSH: D013509

Gynecological surgery refers to surgery on the female reproductive system usually performed by gynecologists. It includes procedures for benign conditions, cancer, infertility, and incontinence. Gynecological surgery may occasionally be performed for optional or cosmetic purposes, such as hymenoplasty or labiaplasty.

== Gynecologic procedures ==
Following are different types of gynecologic procedures-

- Cervical cryosurgery
- Colposcopy
- Dilation and Curettage (D&C)
- Hysteroscopy
- LEEP procedure
- Pelvic laparoscopy

== Gynecologic surgeries ==
Gynecological surgery includes:

- Removal of ovarian cyst
- surgical contraception, and
- Hysterectomy

== Technology development ==
With the advancement of technology there has been robot-assisted surgery in many areas. It helps in avoiding extra testing and other instruments.
