= Self-portrait =

Portrait of an artist made by that artist

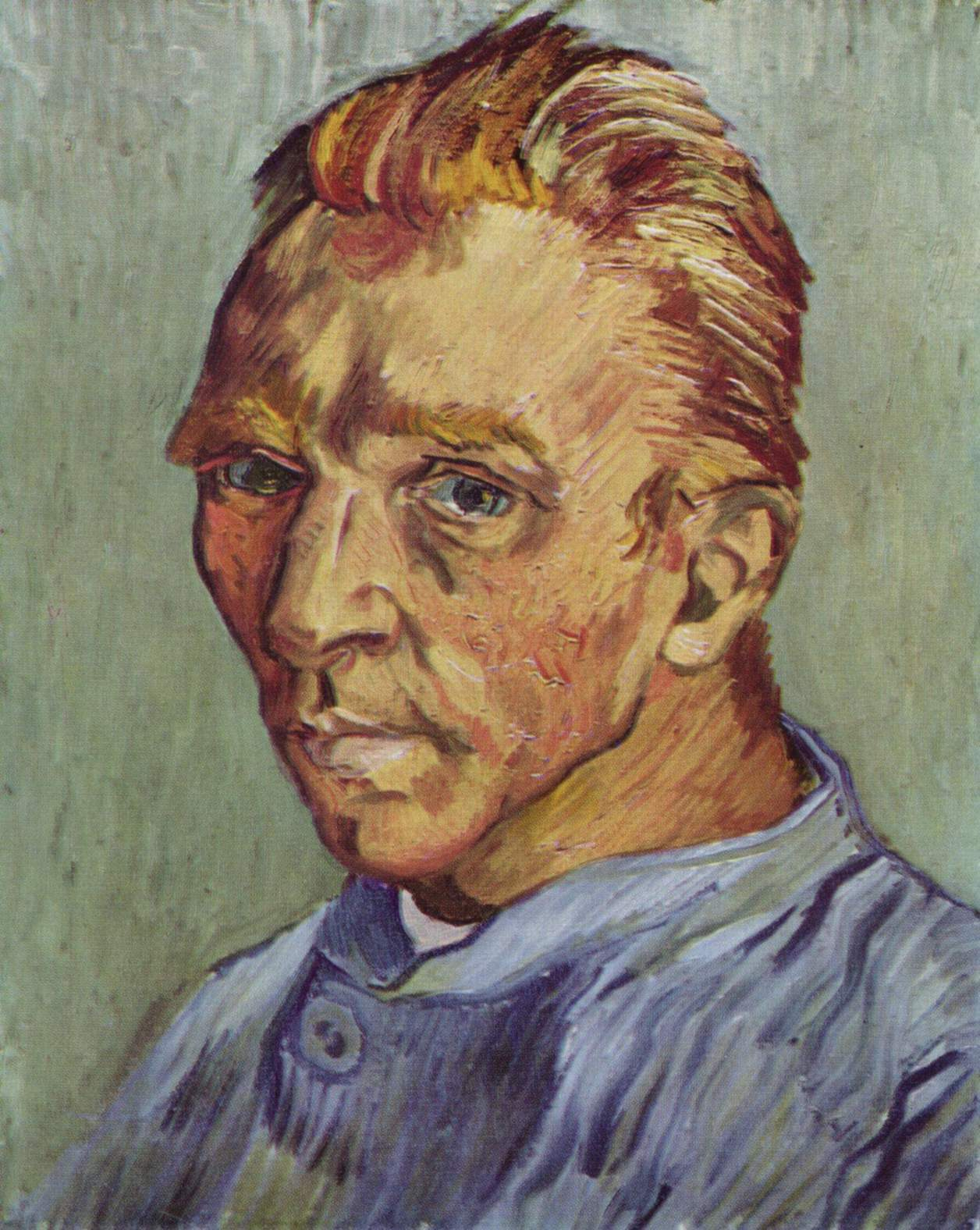
Vincent van Gogh, Self-portrait without beard, end September 1889, (F 525), Oil on canvas, 40 × 31 cm., Private collection. This may have been Van Gogh's last self-portrait. Given as a birthday gift to his mother.

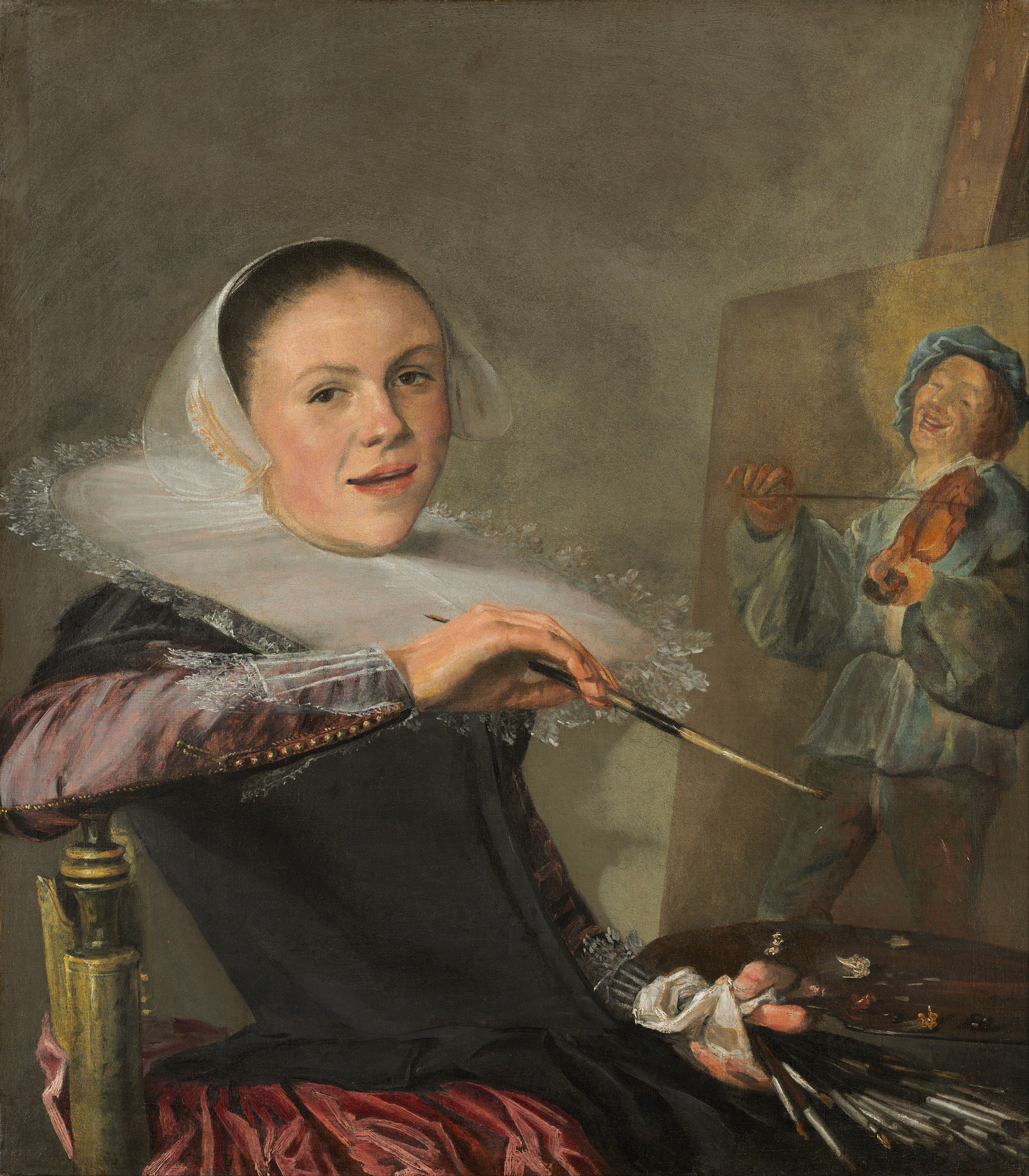
Self-portrait by Judith Leyster, a Dutch Golden Age painter, mostly of genre subjects. NGA, 1630. In reality, she probably did not wear expensive clothes like these while painting.

Self-portraits are portraits artists make of themselves. Although self-portraits have been made since the earliest times, it is not until the mid-15th century that artists can be frequently identified depicting themselves, as either the main subject or important characters in their work. With better and cheaper mirrors, and the advent of the panel portrait, many painters, sculptors and printmakers tried some form of self-portraiture. Portrait of a Man in a Turban by Jan van Eyck of 1433 may well be the earliest known panel self-portrait. He painted a separate portrait of his wife, and he belonged to the social group that had begun to commission portraits, already more common among wealthy Netherlanders than south of the Alps. The genre is venerable, but not until the Renaissance, with increased wealth and interest in the individual as a subject, did it become truly popular.

By the Baroque period, most artists with an established reputation at least left drawings of themselves. Printed portraits of artists had a market, and many were self-portraits. They were also sometimes given as gifts to family and friends. If nothing else, they avoided the need to arrange for a model, and for the many professional portrait-painters, a self-portrait kept in the studio acted as a demonstration of the artist's skill for potential new clients. The unprecedented number of self-portraits by Rembrandt, both as paintings and prints, made clear the potential of the form, and must have further encouraged the trend.

== Types ==
A self-portrait may be a portrait of the artist, or a portrait included in a larger work, including a group portrait. Many painters are said to have included depictions of specific individuals, including themselves, in painting figures in religious or other types of composition. Such paintings were not intended publicly to depict the actual persons as themselves, but the facts would have been known at the time to the artist and patron, creating a talking point as well as a public test of the artist's skill.

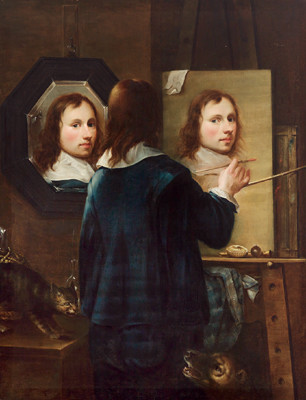
Johannes Gumpp, 1646, shows how most self-portraits were painted.

In the earliest surviving examples of medieval and Renaissance self-portraiture, historical or mythical scenes (from the Bible or classical literature) were depicted using a number of actual persons as models, often including the artist, giving the work a multiple function as portraiture, self-portraiture and history/myth painting. In these works, the artist usually appears as a face in the crowd or group, often towards the edges or corner of the work and behind the main participants. Rubens's The Four Philosophers (1611–12) is a good example. This culminated in the 17th century with the work of Jan de Bray. Many artistic media have been used; apart from paintings, drawings and prints have been especially important.

In the famous Arnolfini Portrait (1434), Jan van Eyck is probably one of two figures glimpsed in a mirror – a surprisingly modern conceit. The Van Eyck painting may have inspired Diego Velázquez to depict himself in full view as the painter creating Las Meninas (1656), as the Van Eyck hung in the palace in Madrid where he worked. This was another modern flourish, given that he appears as the painter (previously unseen in official royal portraiture) and standing close to the King's family group who were the supposed main subjects of the painting.

In what may be one of the earliest childhood self-portraits now surviving, Albrecht Dürer depicts himself as in naturalistic style as a 13-year-old boy in 1484. In later years he appears variously as a merchant in the background of Biblical scenes and as Christ.

Leonardo da Vinci may have drawn a picture of himself at the age of 60, in around 1512. The picture is often straightforwardly reproduced as Da Vinci's appearance, although this is not certain.

In the 17th century, Rembrandt painted a range of self-portraits. In The Prodigal Son in the Tavern (c1637), one of the earliest self-portraits with family, the painting probably includes Saskia, Rembrandt's wife, one of the earliest depictions of a family member by a famous artist. Family and professional group paintings, including the artist's depiction, became increasingly common from the 17th century on. From the later 20th century on, video plays an increasing part in self-portraiture, and adds the dimension of audio as well, allowing the person to speak to an audience in their own voice.

=== Gallery: Inserted self-portraits ===
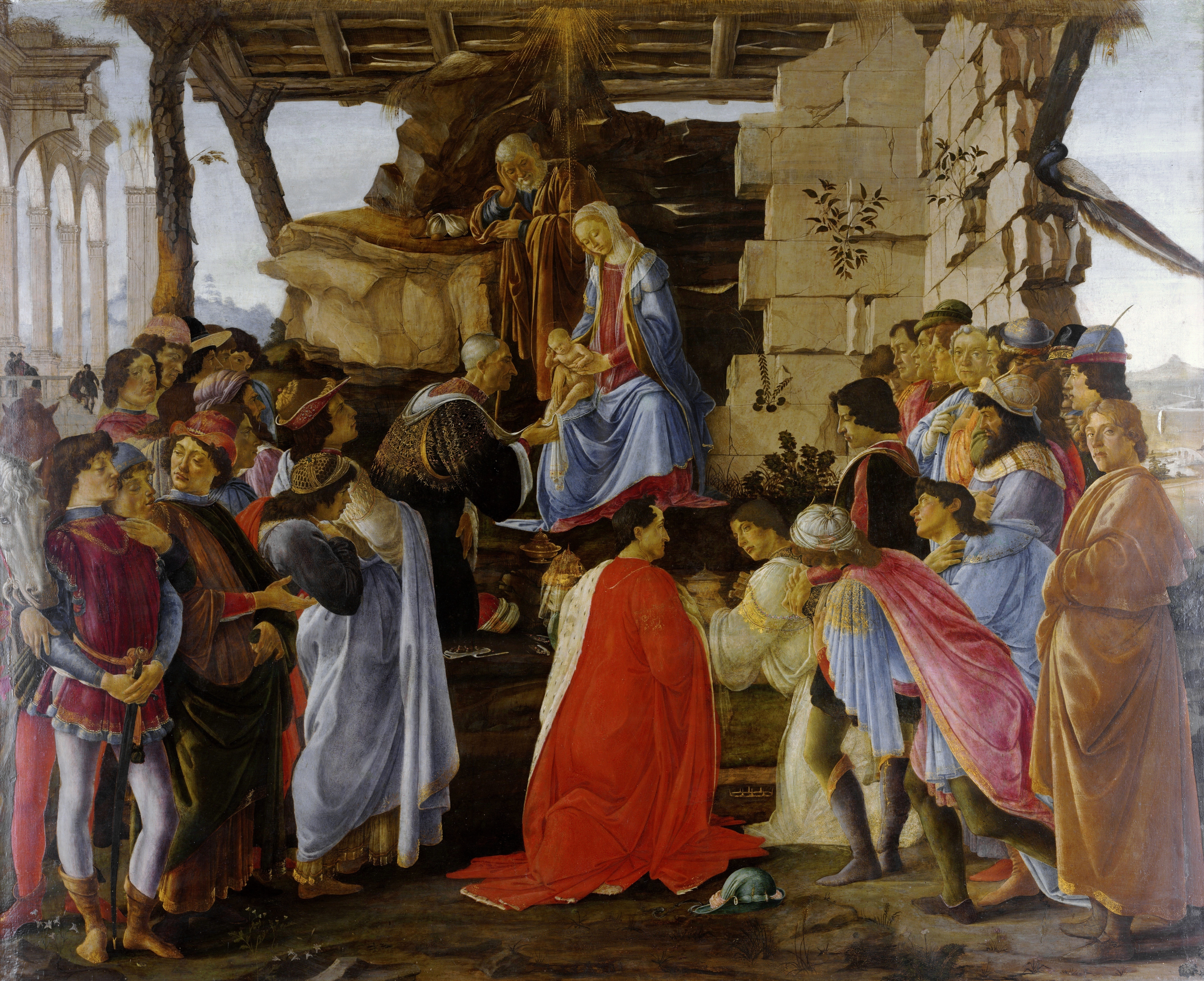
Sandro Botticelli's 1475 painting of the Adoration of the Magi has an "inserted self-portrait". The position in the (right) corner, and the gaze out to the viewer, are very typical of such self-portraits.

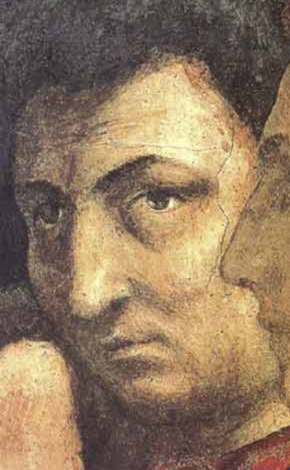
Masaccio inserted self-portrait from the Brancacci Chapel frescoes (as is the Filippino Lippi), 1424–1426.

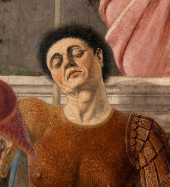
Piero della Francesca as a sleeping soldier in his Resurrection, 1463, fresco, Sansepolcro.

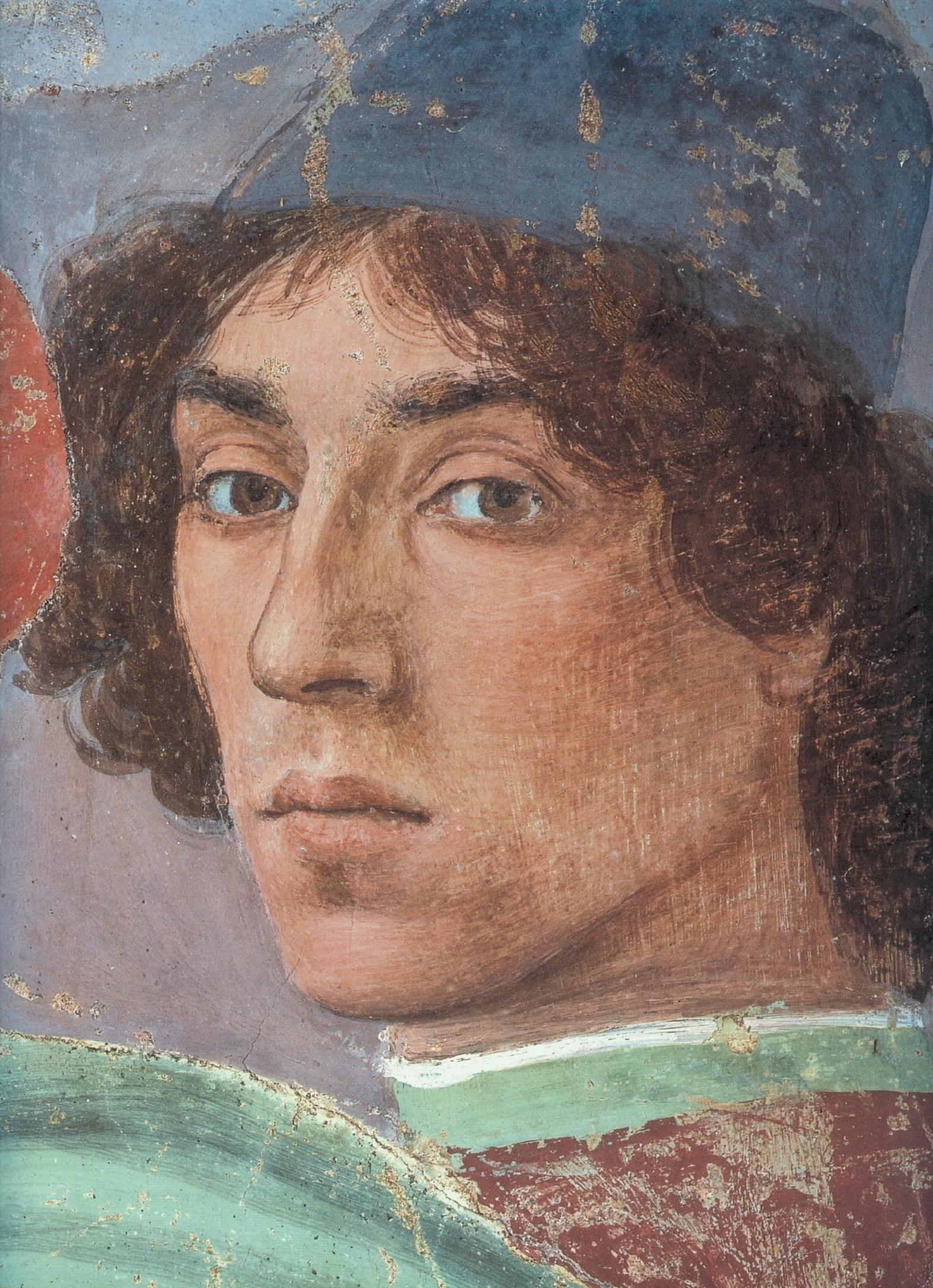
Filippino Lippi as a figure in his Martyrdom of Saint Peter, fresco, 1481–82, Brancacci Chapel, Florence. He is at the extreme right of a crowded composition.

Frida Kahlo, Self-Portrait with Thorn Necklace and Hummingbird, 1940, Nickolas Muray Collection, Harry Ransom Center, University of Texas at Austin

=== Women painters ===
Almost all significant women painters have left self-portraits, from Caterina van Hemessen to the prolific Elisabeth Vigée Le Brun, and Frida Kahlo, as well as Alice Neel, Paula Modersohn-Becker and Jenny Saville who painted themselves in the nude. Vigée-Lebrun painted a total of 37 self-portraits, many of which were copies of earlier ones, painted for sale. Until the 20th century women were usually unable to train in drawing the nude, which made it difficult for them to paint large figure compositions, leading many artists to specialize in portrait work. Women artists have historically embodied a number of roles within their self-portraiture. Most common is the artist at work, showing themselves in the act of painting, or at least holding a brush and palette. Often, the viewer wonders if the clothes worn were those they normally painted in, as the elaborate nature of many ensembles was an artistic choice to show her skill at fine detail.

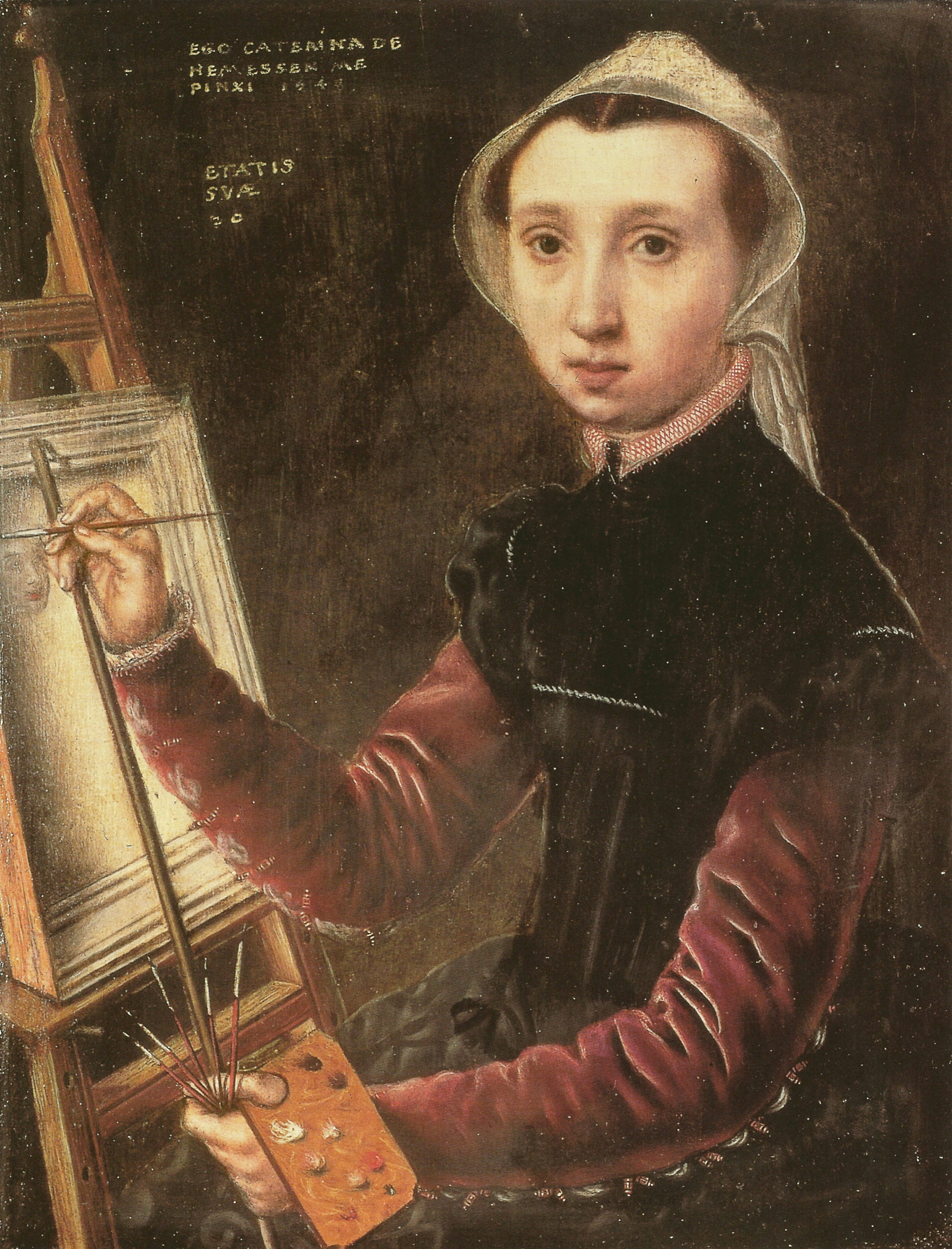
Caterina van Hemessen's 1548 self-portrait, perhaps the oldest self-portrait of a female oil-painter, though much earlier examples of manuscript painters exist.

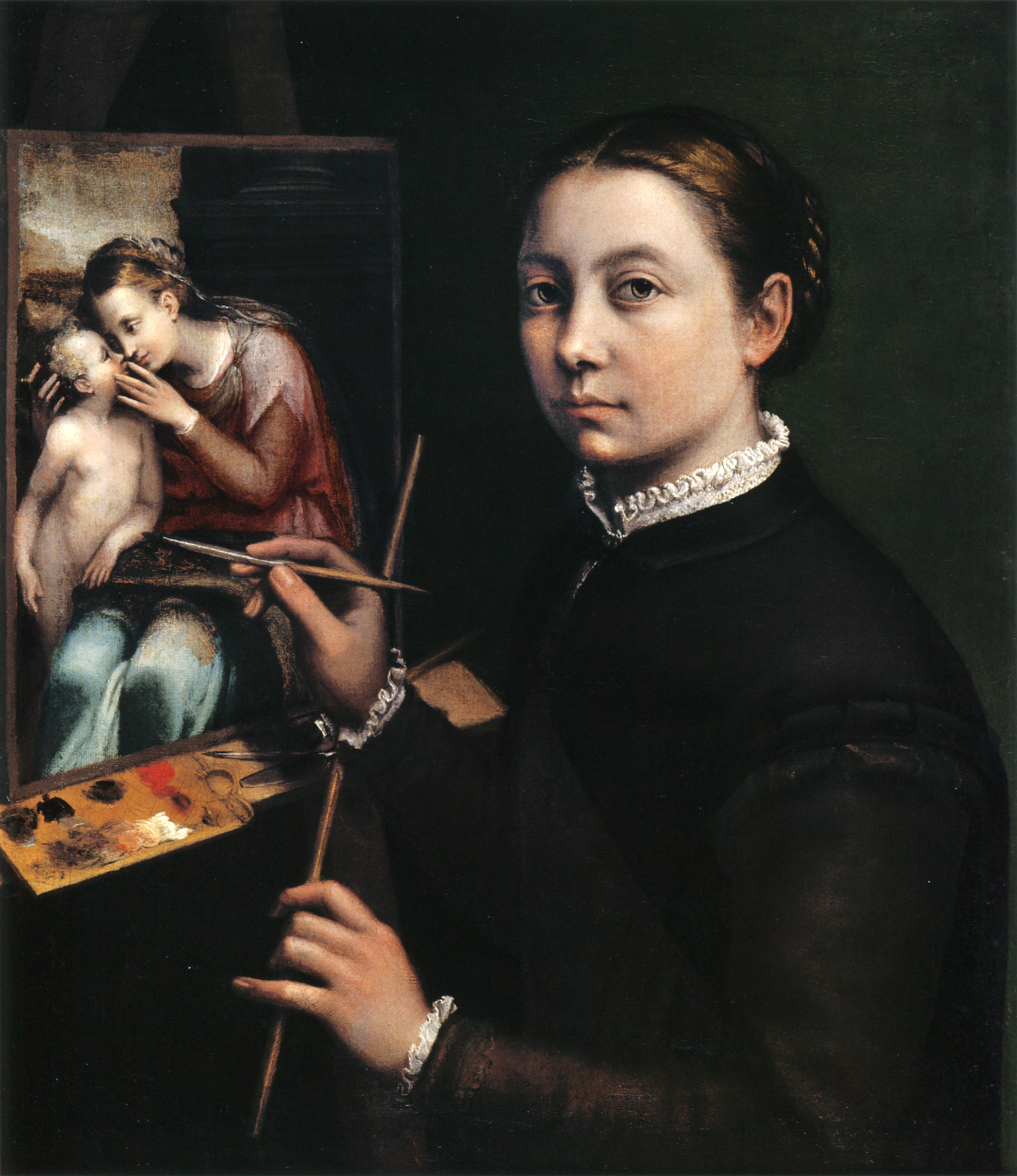
Sofonisba Anguissola (c. 1532–1625) of Cremona served as court painter to the Queen of Spain, and painted several self-portraits and many images of her family. c. 1556

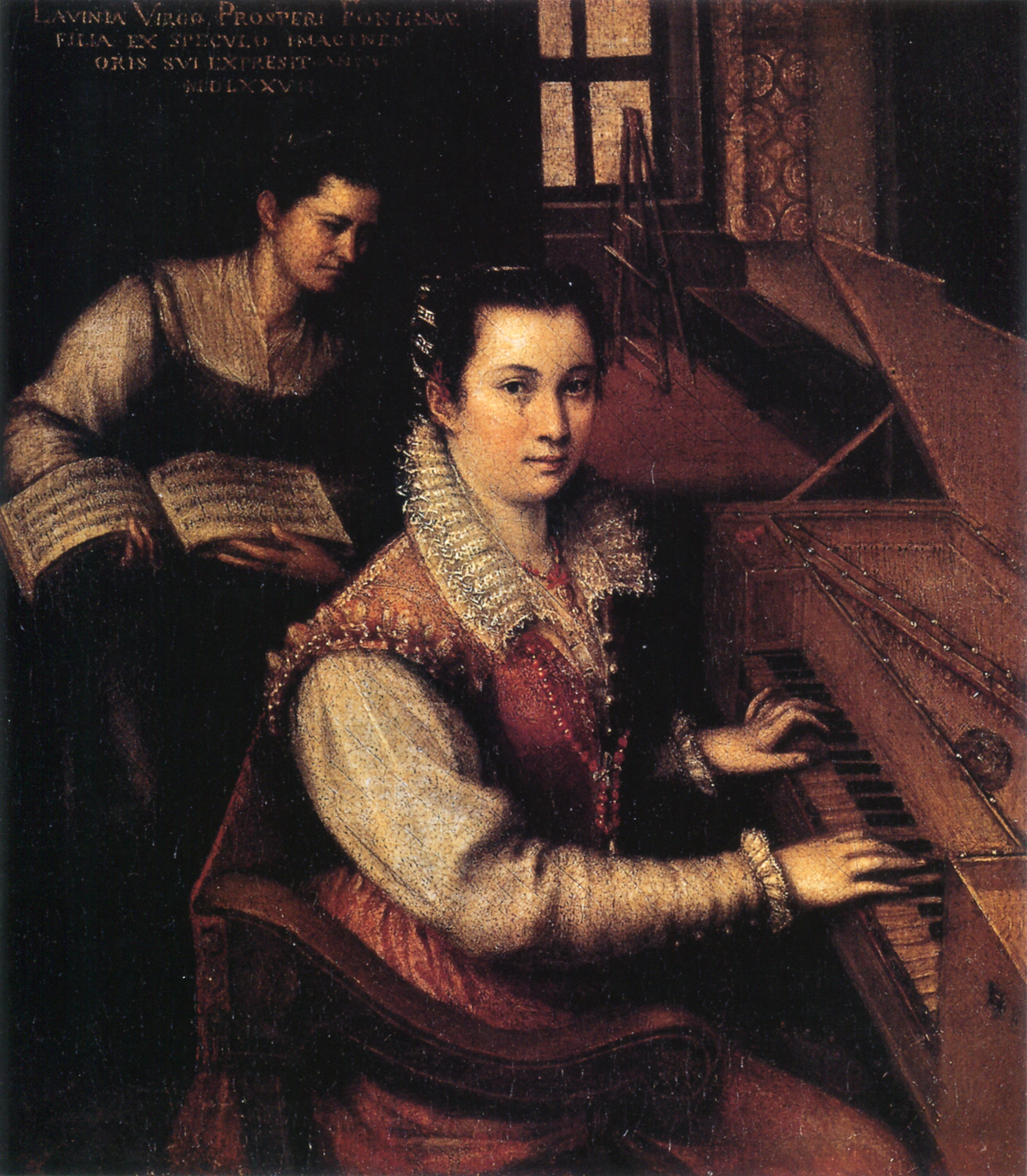
Lavinia Fontana, Self-portrait at the Clavichord with a Servant, 1577. She was born in Bologna, the daughter of Prospero Fontana, who was a painter of the School of Bologna.

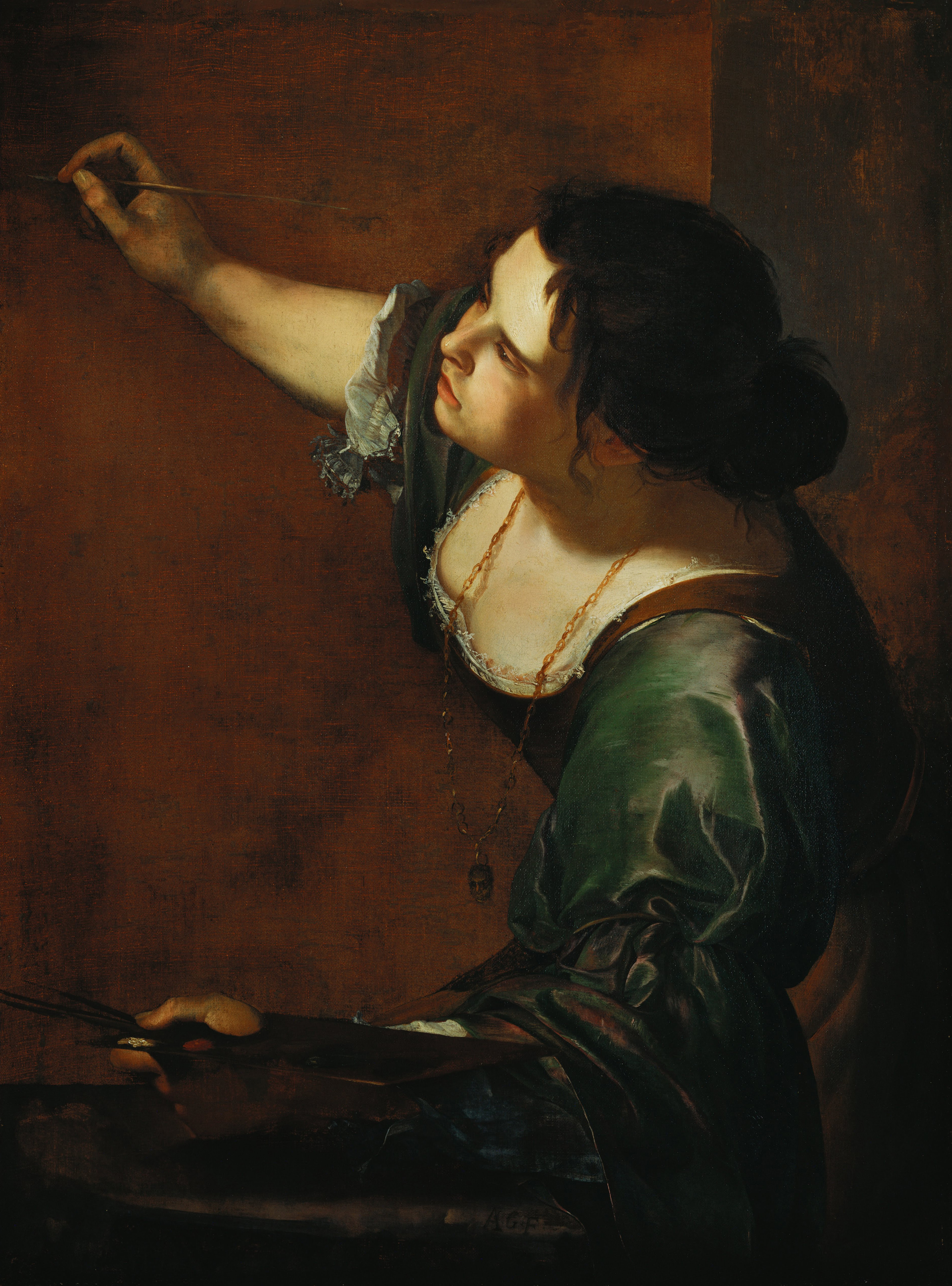
Artemisia Gentileschi, Self-Portrait as the Allegory of Painting, 1630s, Royal Collection. Note the pulled-up sleeve on the arm holding the brush.

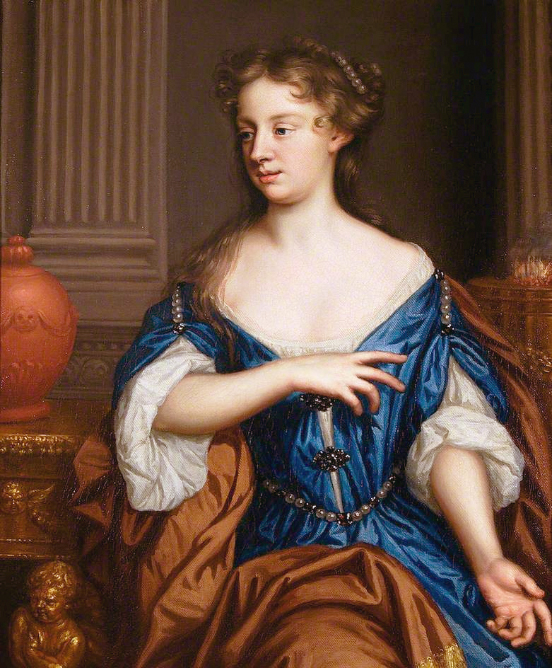
Mary Beale, Self-portrait, c. 1675–1680, She became one of the most important portrait painters of 17th-century England, and has been described as the first professional female English painter.

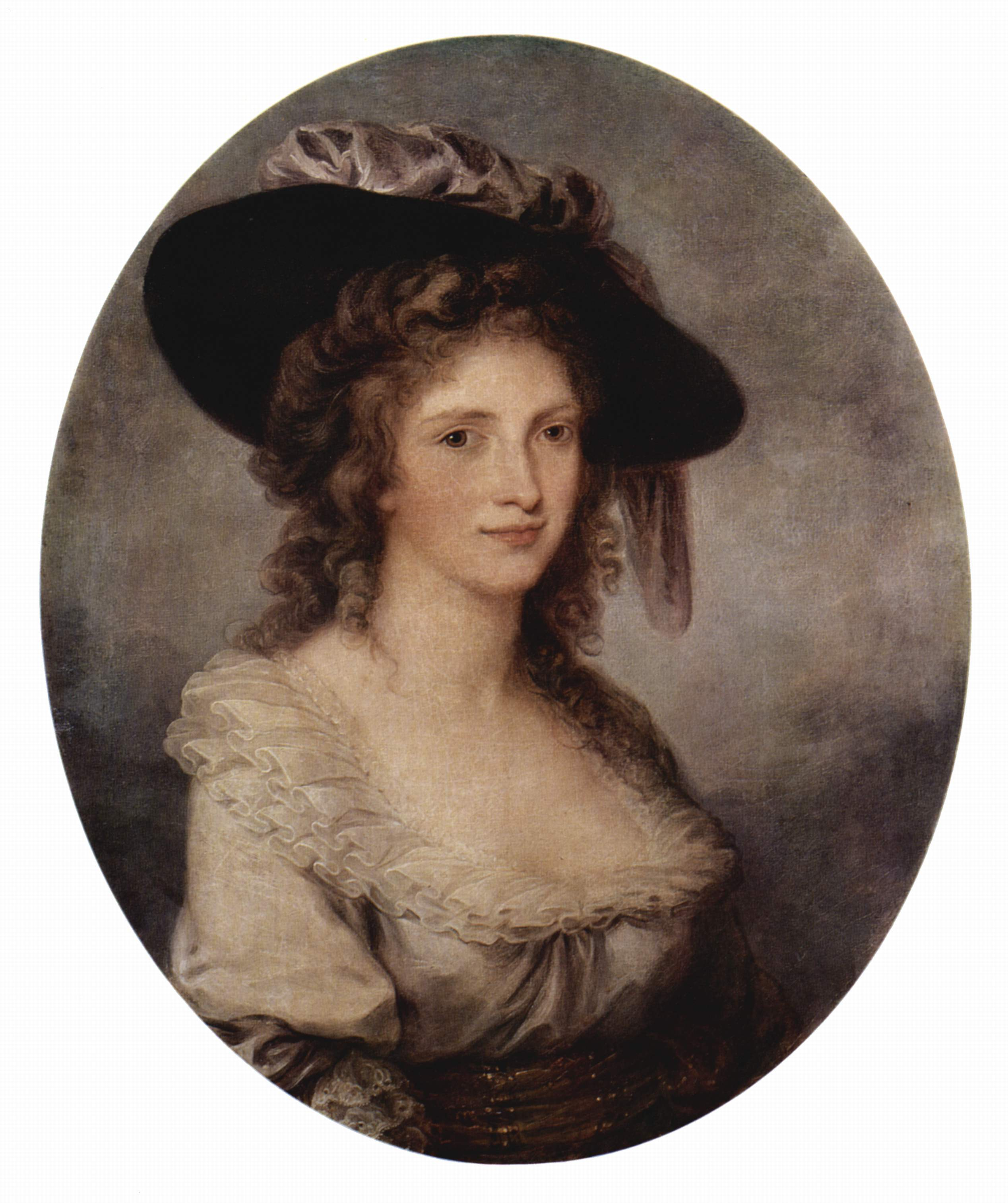
Angelica Kauffman, self-portrait, 1780–1785, a successful painter in her time, she was a great friend of Sir Joshua Reynolds.

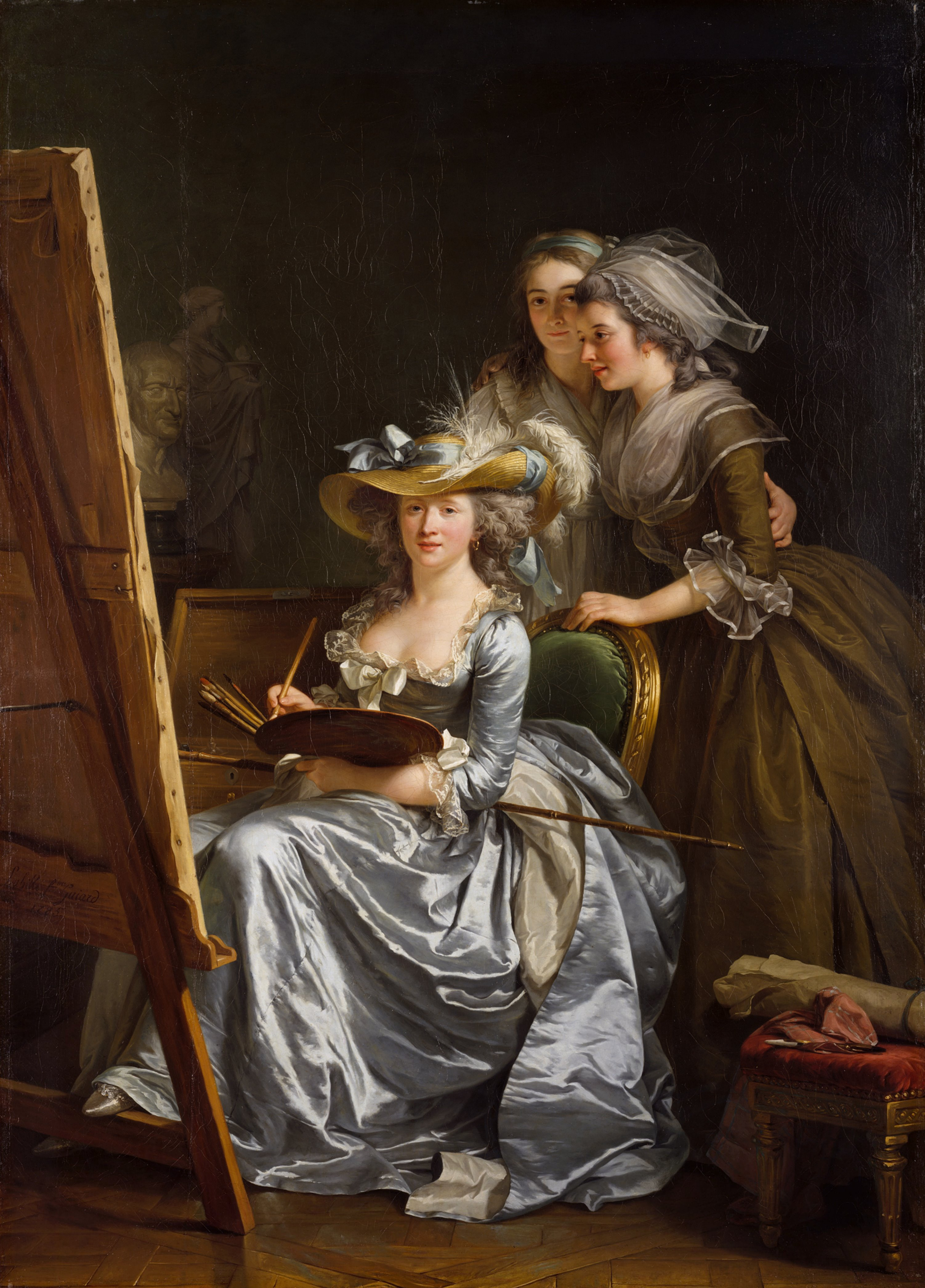
Adélaïde Labille-Guiard, 1785, with two pupils. A "subjects-eye" view of the painter at work. It seems likely that women society portraitists did actually paint wearing fashionable clothes like this.

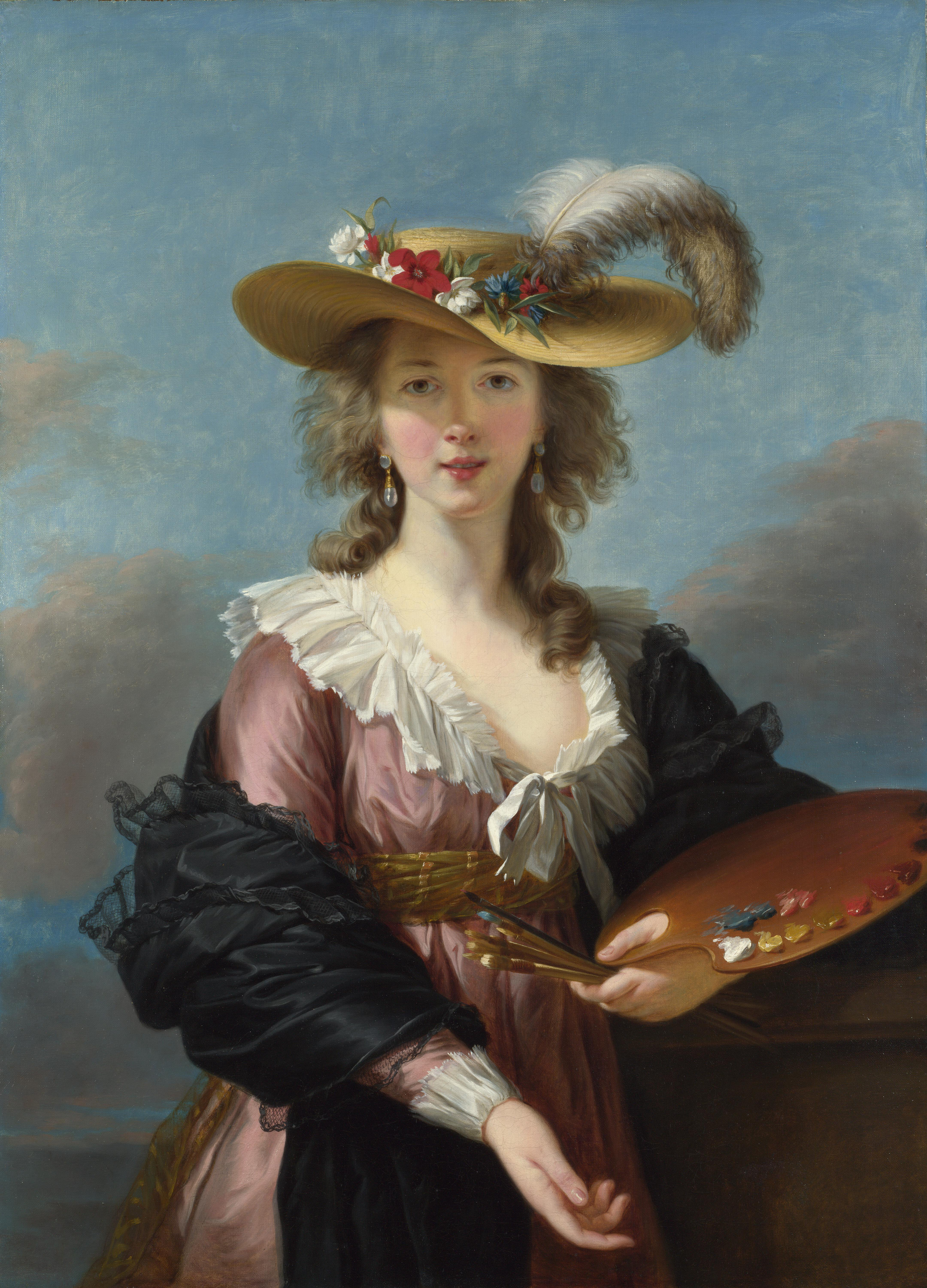
Self-portrait in a Straw Hat
Élisabeth Vigée Le Brun painted several self-portraits that were hugely successful in the Paris Salons, and was influential in pioneering an "informal" fashion style at the end of the Ancien Régime. At 22, 1782.

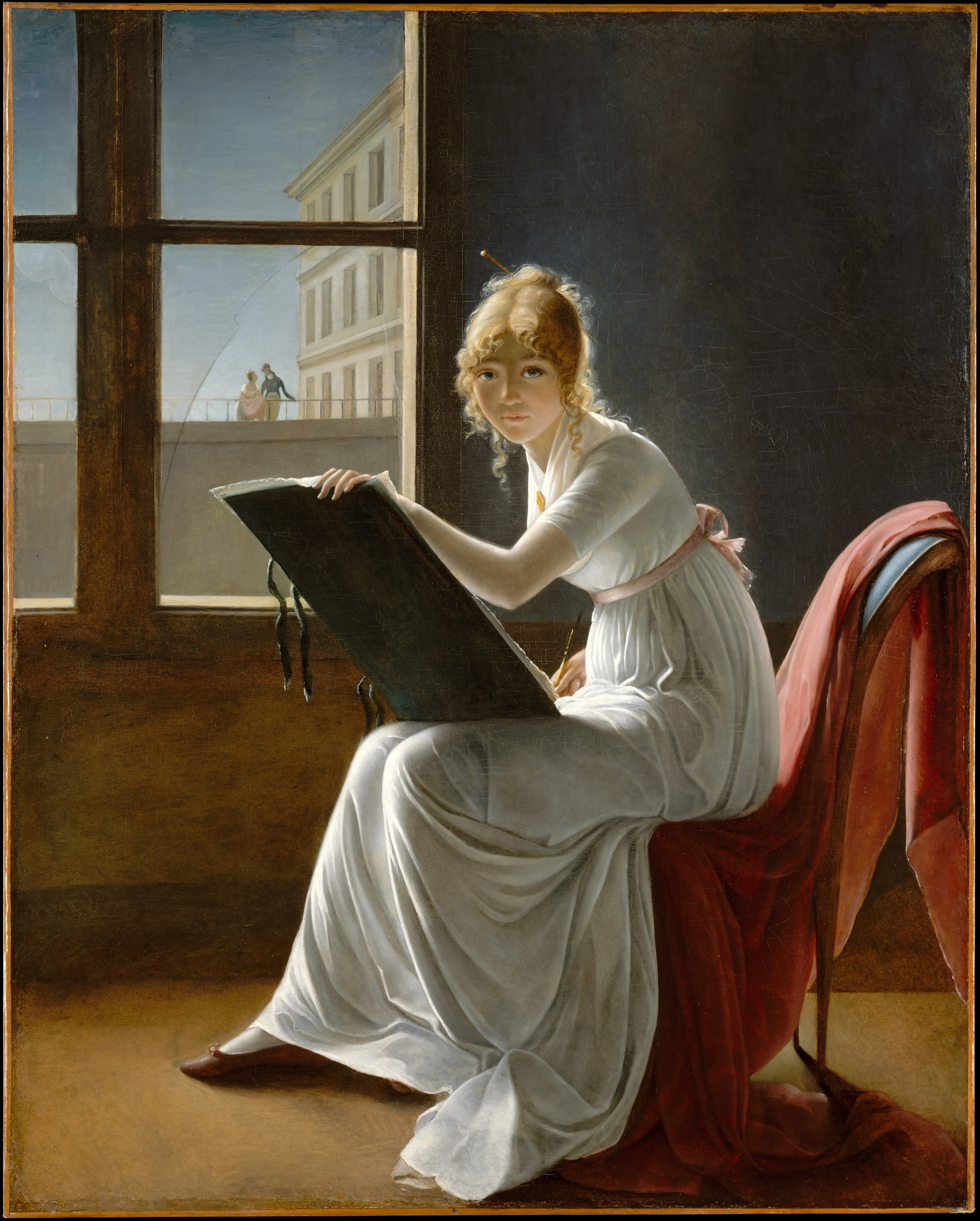
Marie-Denise Villers, Young Woman Drawing, 1801, thought to be her self-portrait, and her most famous and finest painting. Originally attributed to Jacques-Louis David.

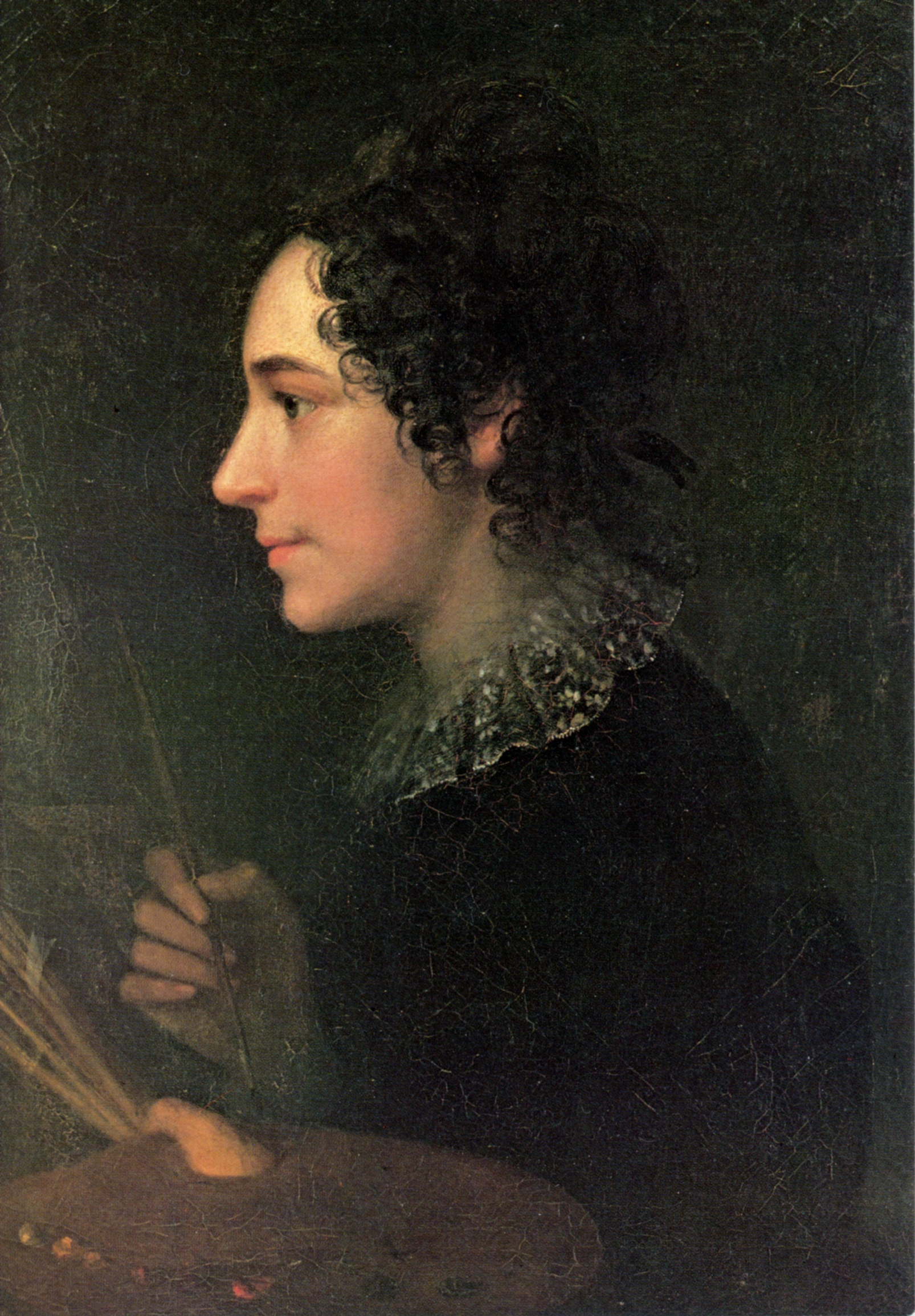
Marie Ellenrieder, self portrait, 1819. A German religious artist and the first woman to enter the Academy of Munich.

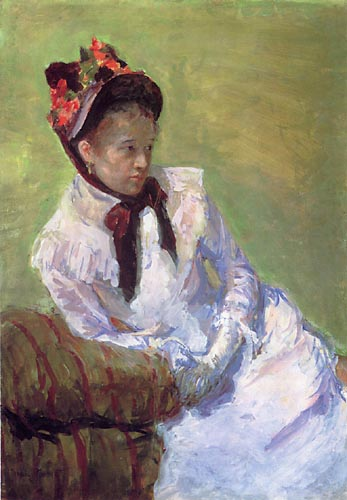
Mary Cassatt was an American portrait painter who specialized in portraits of women and children, 1878.

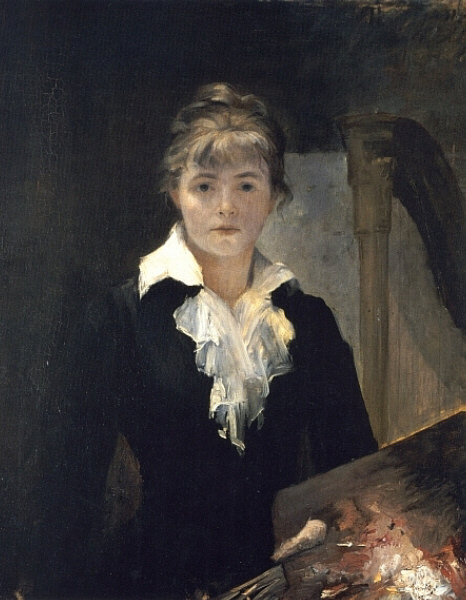
Marie Bashkirtseff self-portrait, 1880 was a Russian born artist who died at twenty-five. A large number of Bashkirtseff's works were destroyed by the Nazis during World War II.

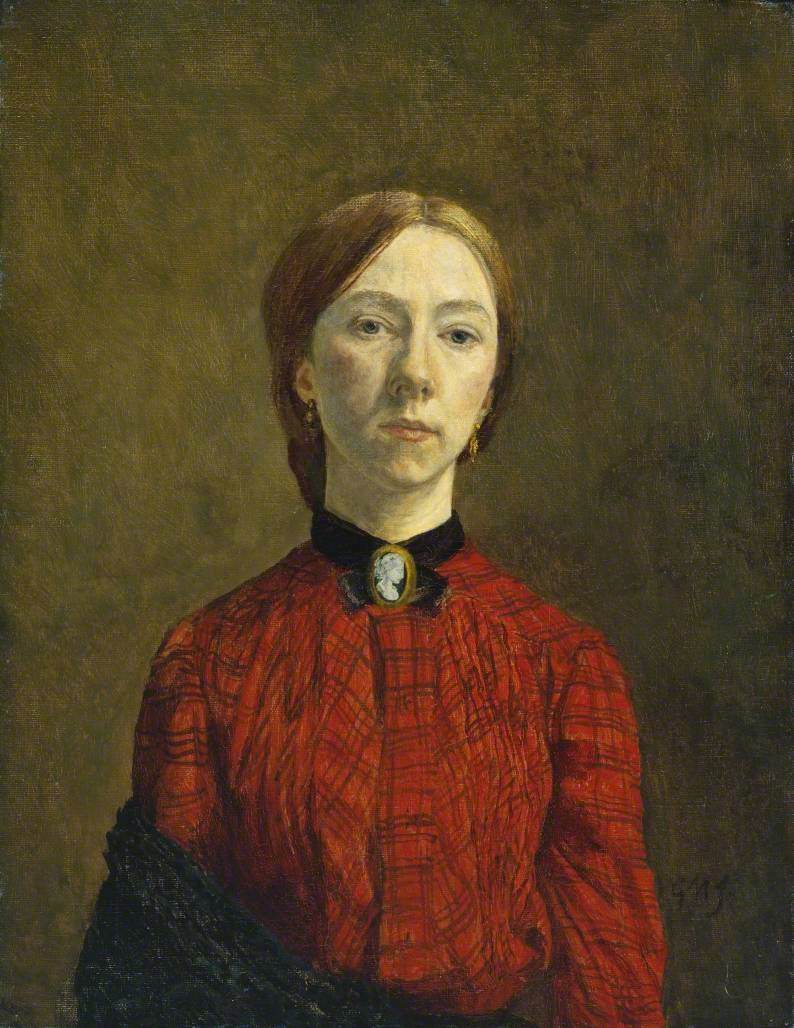
Gwen John (1902) also mostly painted women and children.

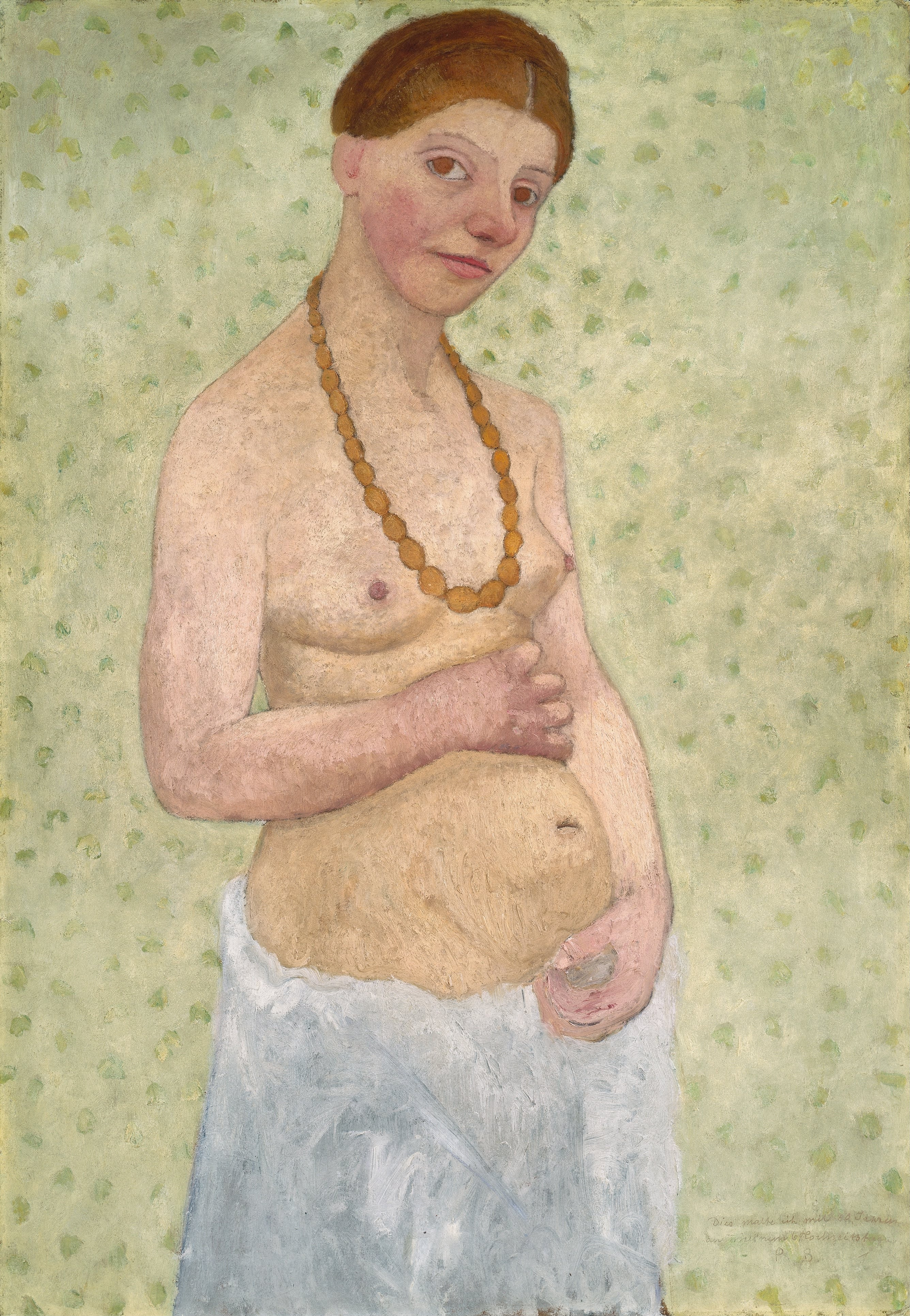
Paula Modersohn-Becker, Selbstbildnis am 6 Hochzeitstag ("Self-portrait on her 6th wedding anniversary") 1906. She depicts herself as pregnant, which at that point she never had been.

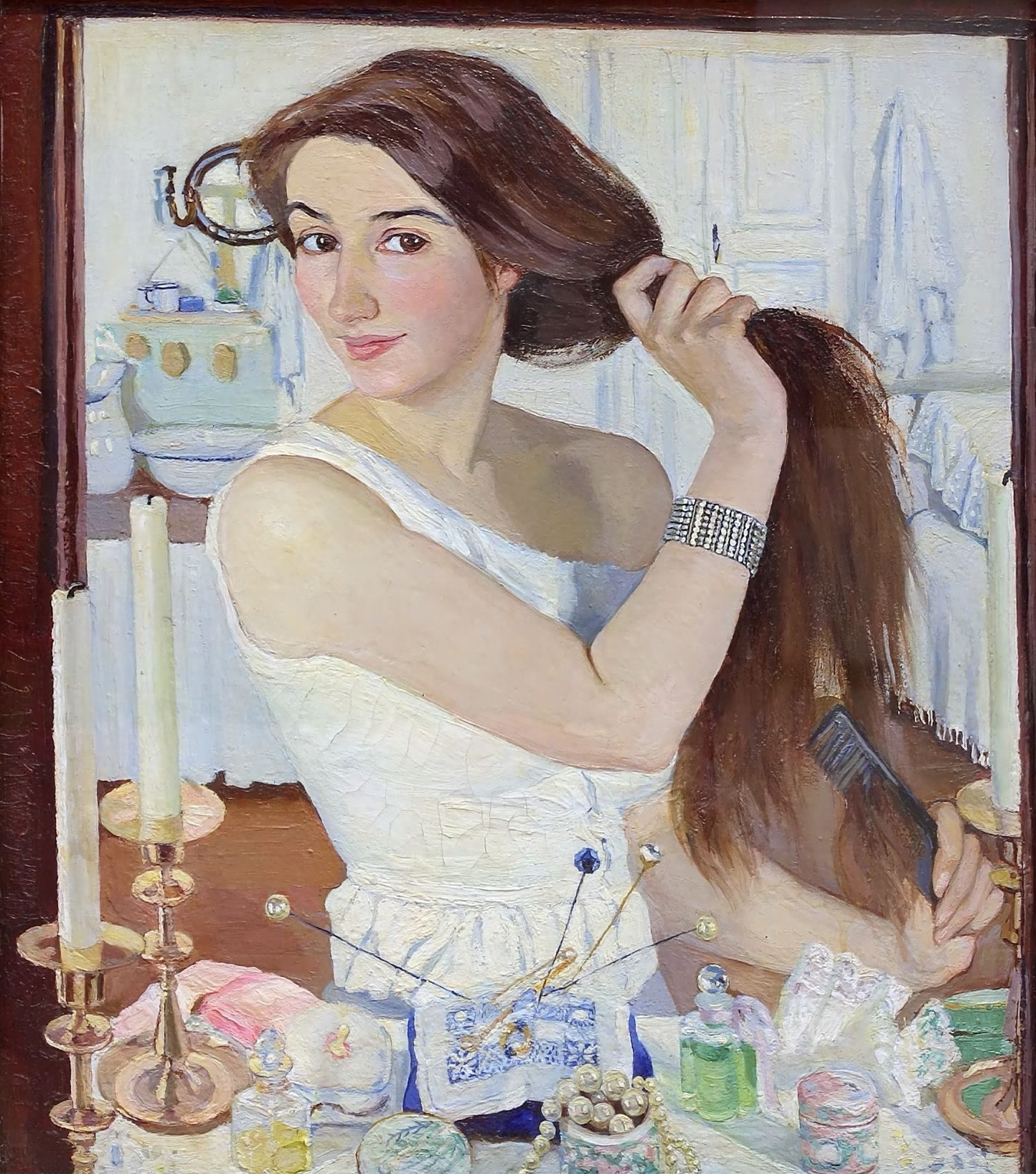
Zinaida Serebriakova, At the Dressing-Table (1909), was among the first female Ukrainian painters of distinction.

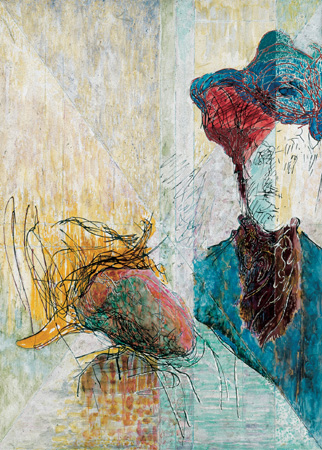
Ilka Gedő, Double Self-Portrait, 1985. The number of self-portraits on paper is about 370 and there are eight self-portraits in oil.

== Antiquity ==
Images of artists at work are encountered in Ancient Egyptian painting, and sculpture and also on Ancient Greek vases. One of the first self-portraits was made by the Pharaoh Akhenaten's chief sculptor Bak in 1365 BC. Plutarch mentions that the Ancient Greek sculptor Phidias had included a likeness of himself in a number of characters in the "Battle of the Amazons" on the Parthenon, and there are classical references to painted self-portraits, none of which have survived.

== Asia ==
Self-portraits may have a longer continuous history in Asian (mainly Chinese) art than in Europe. Many in the scholar gentleman tradition are quite small, depicting the artist in a large landscape, illustrating a poem in calligraphy on his experience of the scene. Another tradition, associated with Zen Buddhism, produced lively semi-caricatured self-portraits, whilst others remain closer to the conventions of the formal portrait.

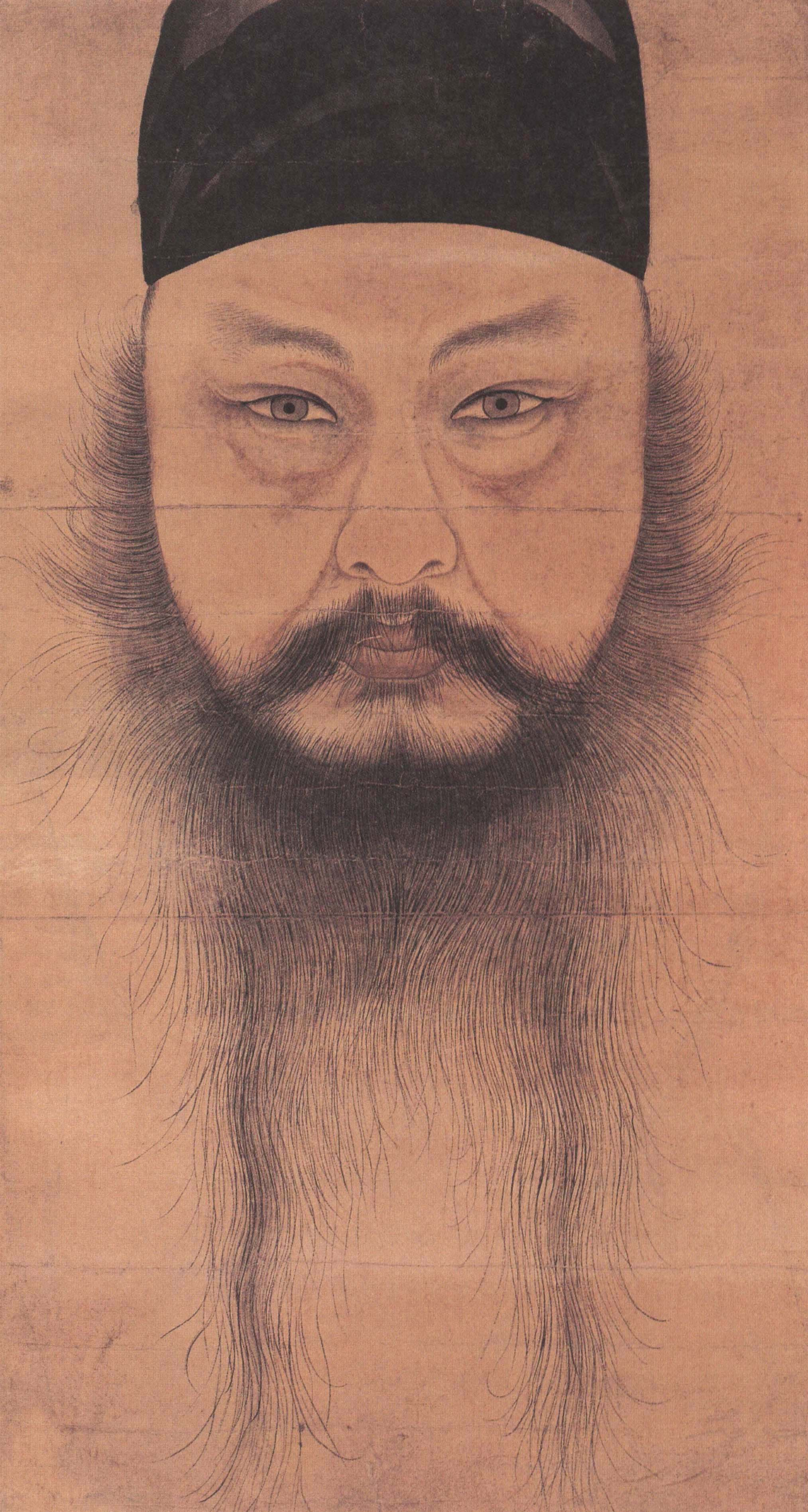
Self-portrait by Yun Tusŏ, 1710, South Korea (Joseon)

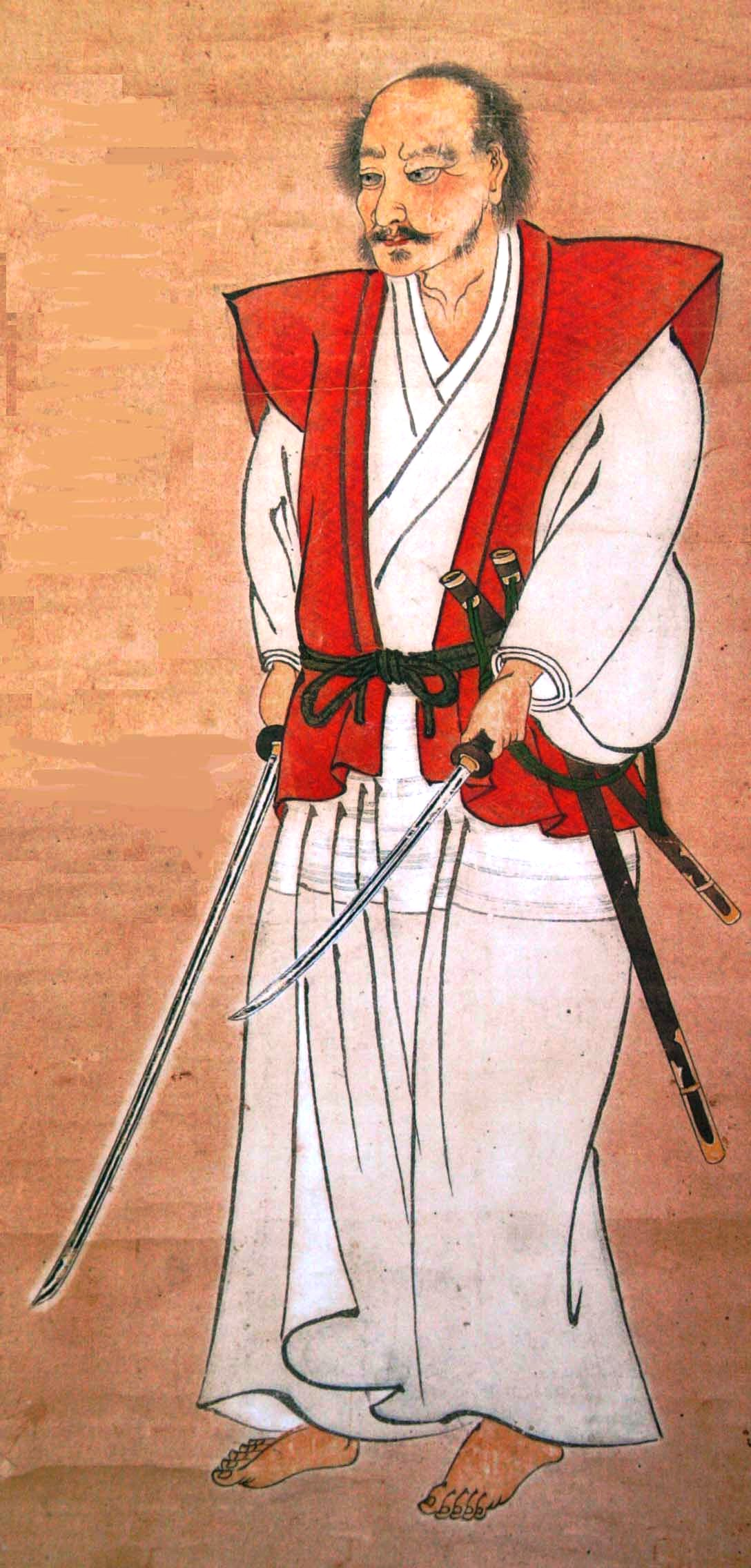
Miyamoto Musashi, Samurai, writer and artist, c. 1640.

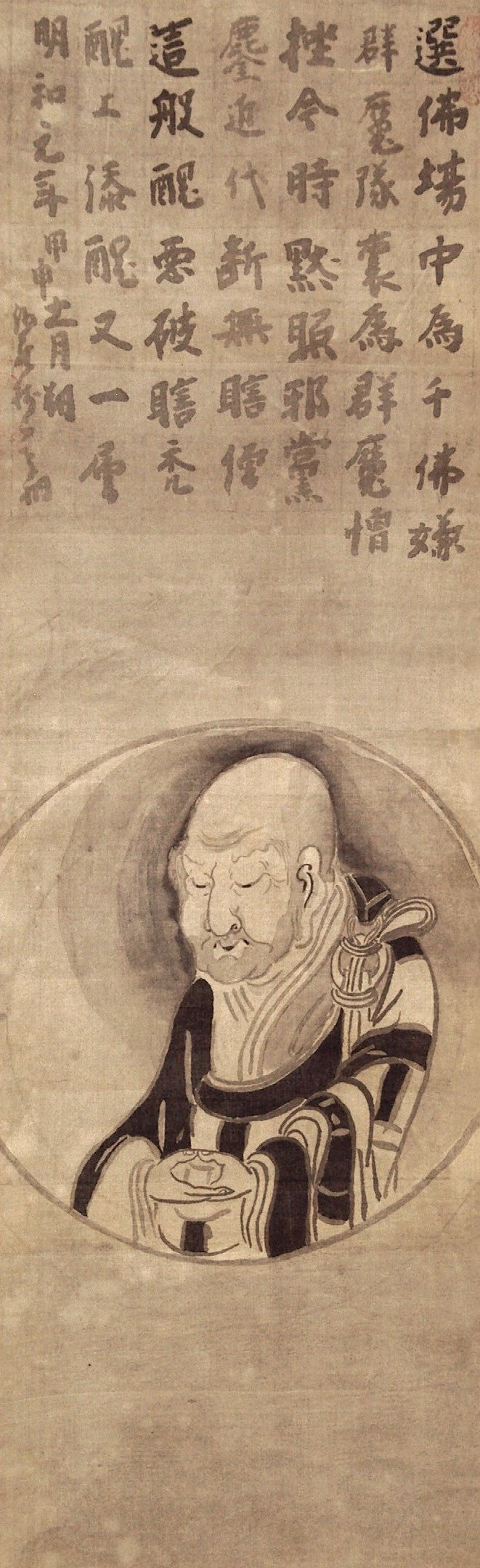
Hakuin Ekaku was a Zen monk, who painted many self-portraits of himself as sages of the past, 1764, Tokyo.

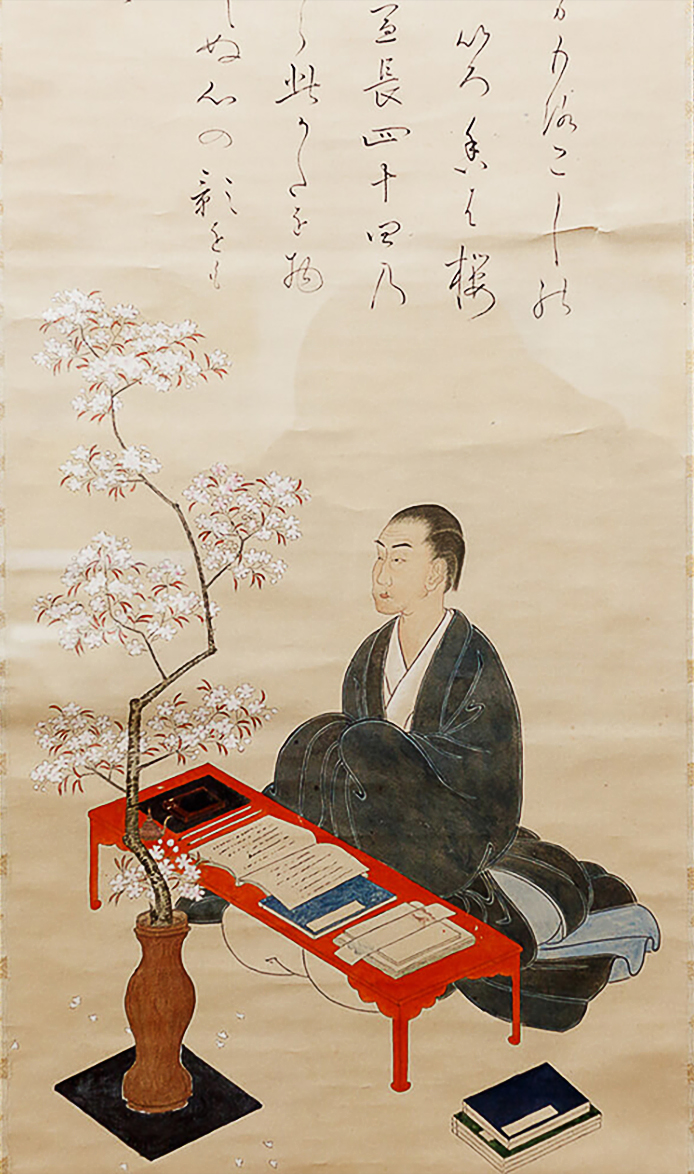
Motoori Norinaga, late 18th century, Japan

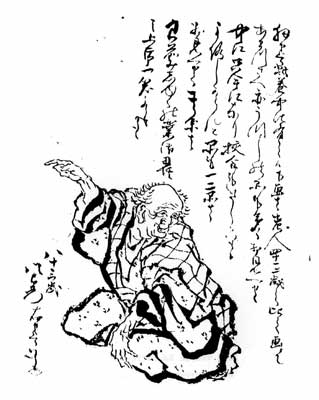
Hokusai, early 19th century, Japan

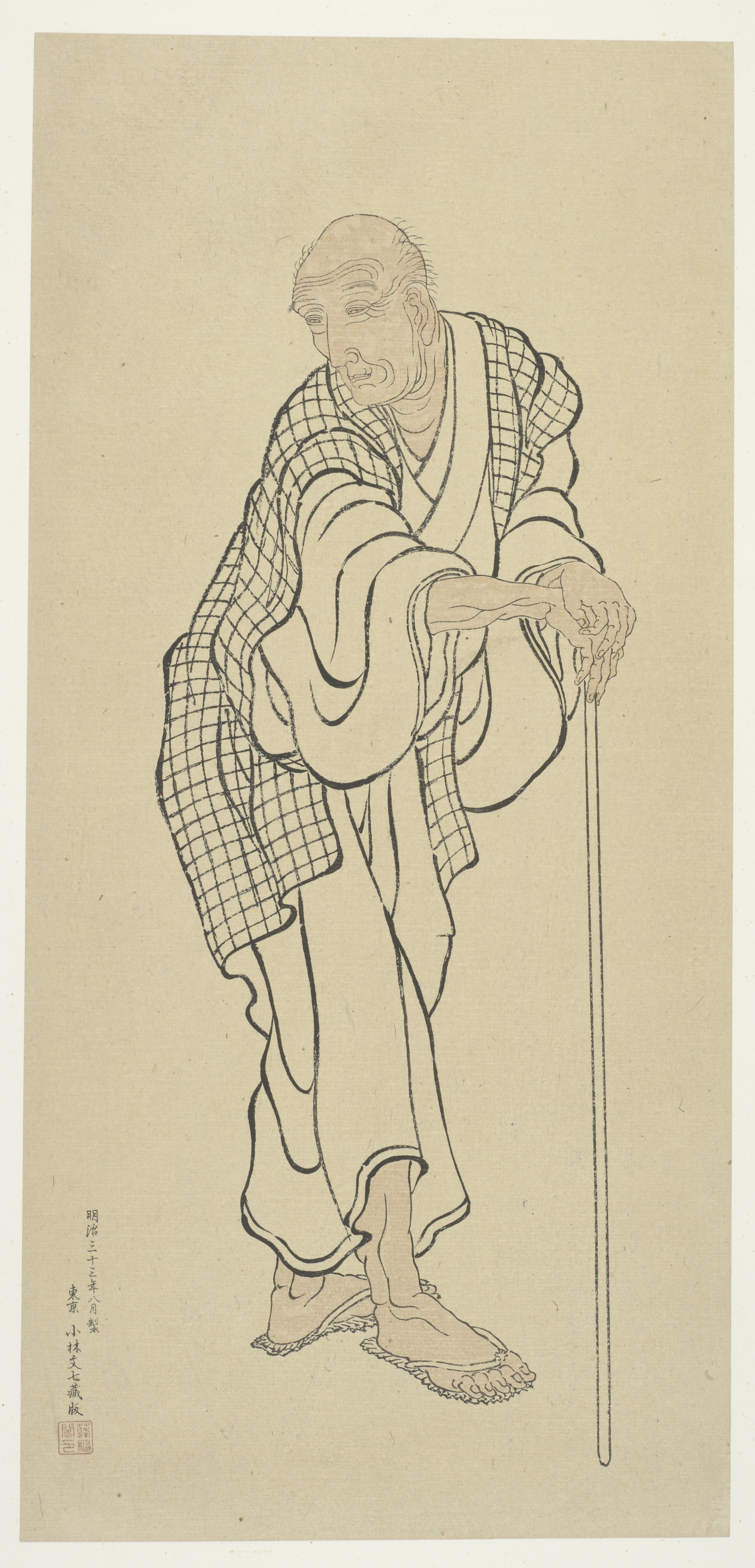
Another Hokusai, Smithsonian

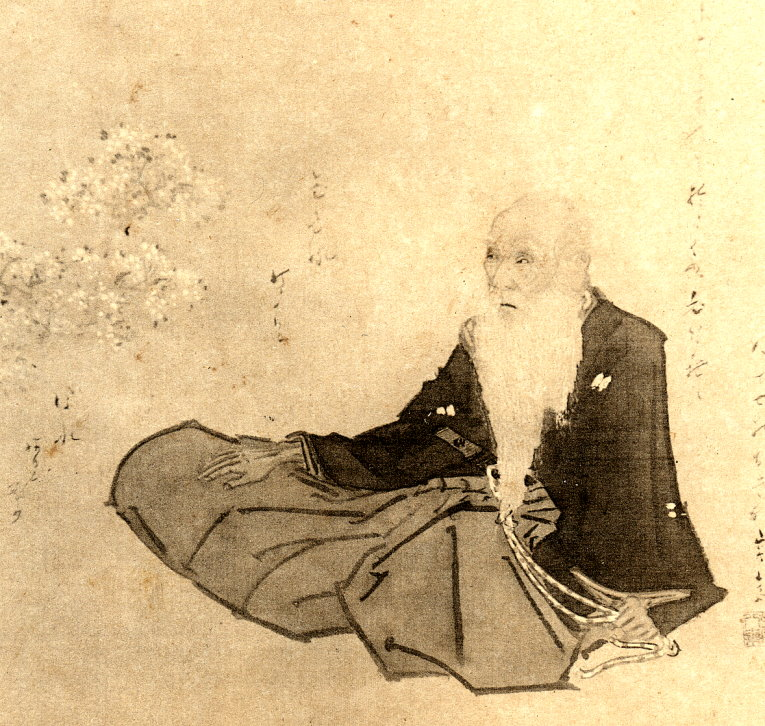
Kikuchi Yōsai, 1856–7, Japan.

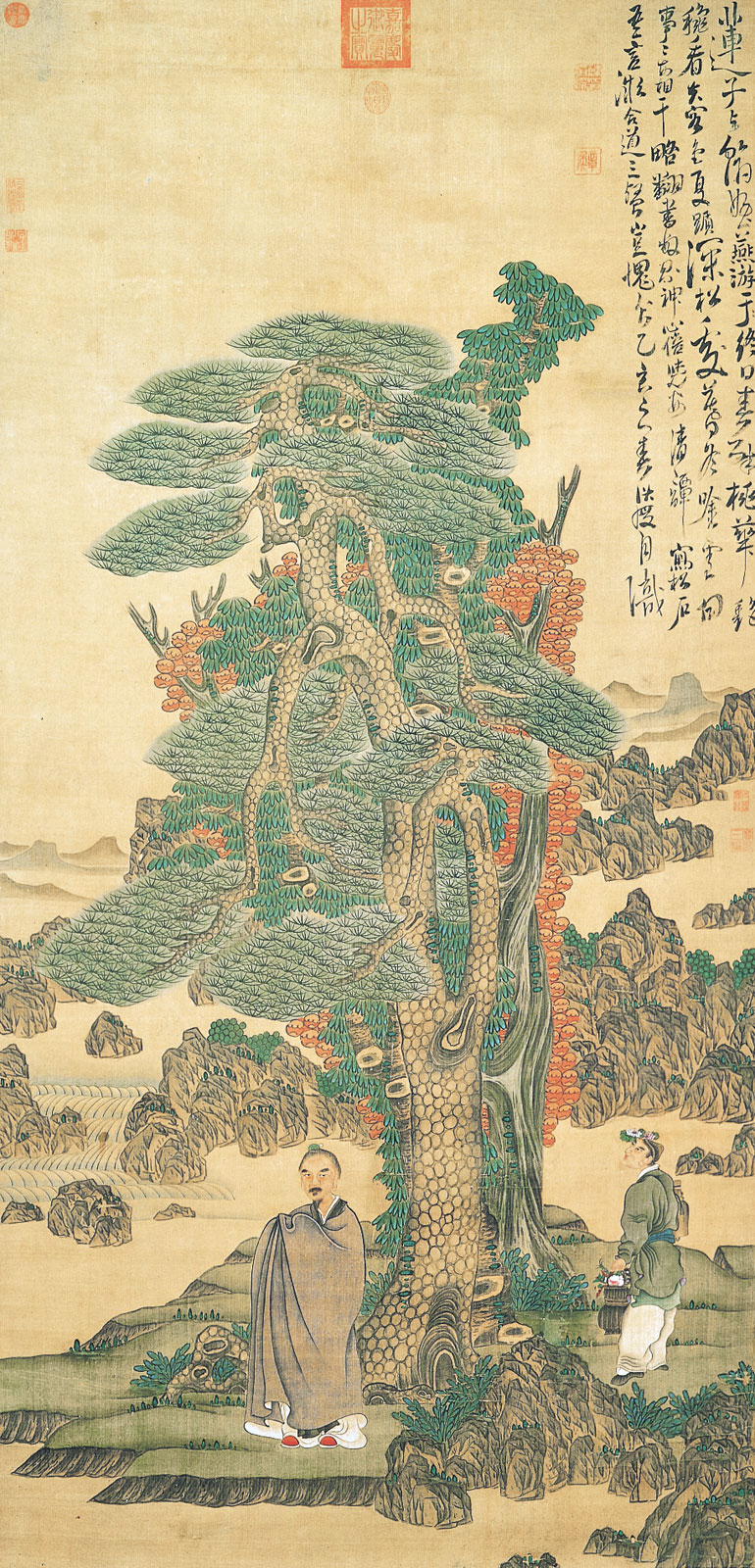
Chen Hongshou, China, 1635

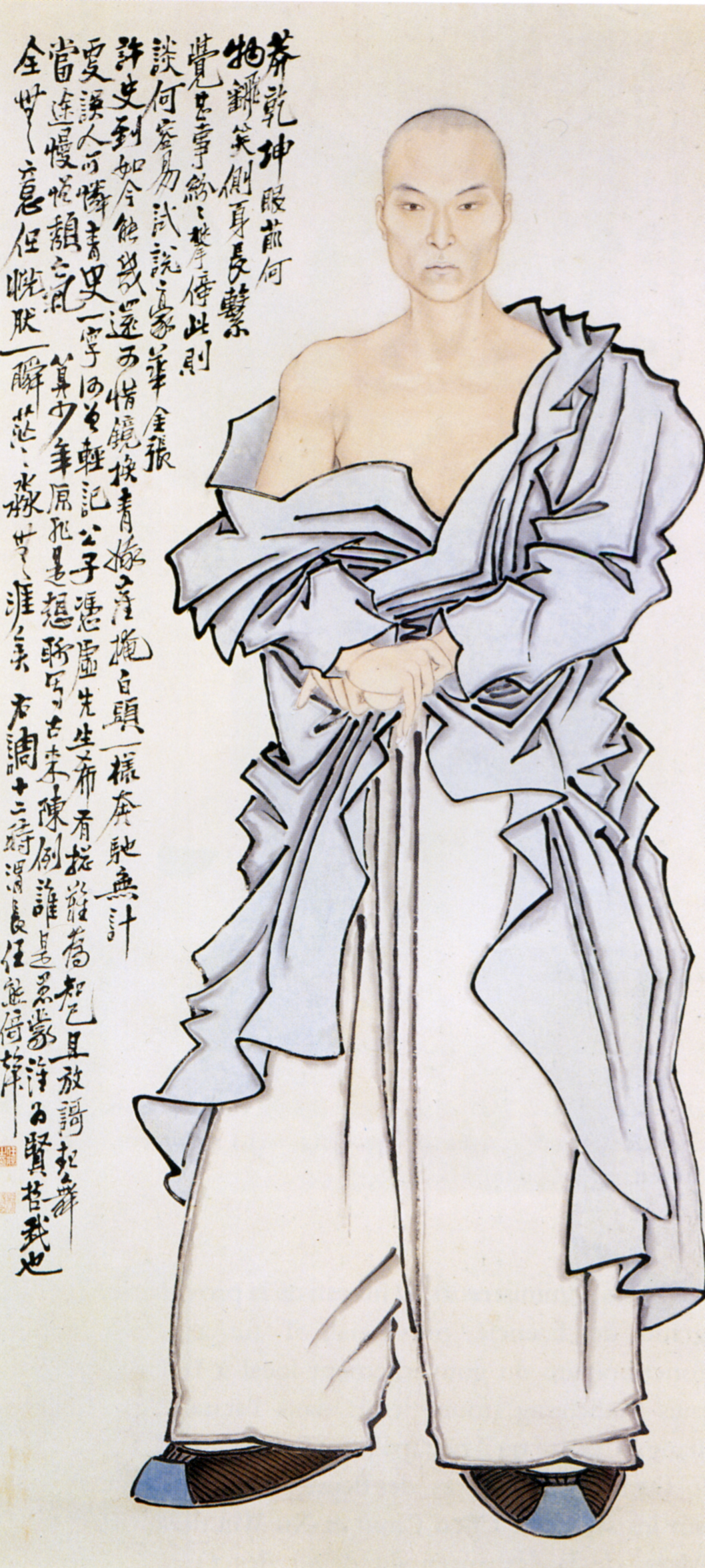
Ren Xiong, a member of the Shanghai school, c. 1850

== European art ==
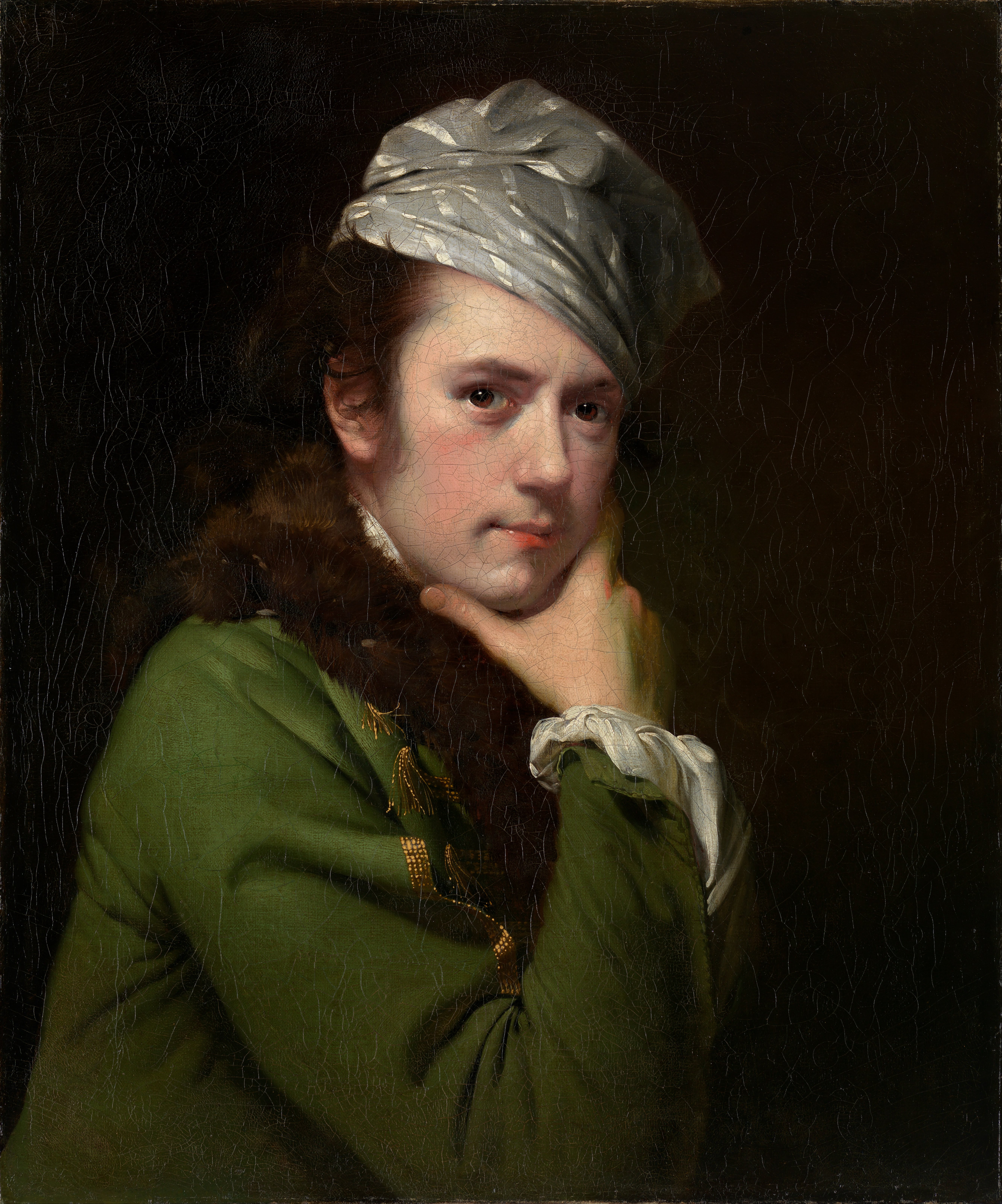
Joseph Wright of Derby Self-portrait (1765-1768)

Illuminated manuscripts contain a number of apparent self-portraits, notably those of Saint Dunstan and Matthew Paris. Most of these either show the artist at work, or presenting the finished book to either a donor or a sacred figure, or venerating such a figure. Orcagna is believed to have painted himself as a figure in a fresco of 1359, which became, at least according to art historians — Vasari records a number of such traditions — a common practice of artists. However, for earlier artists, with no other portrait to compare to, these descriptions are necessarily rather speculative. Among the earliest self-portraits are also two frescos by Johannes Aquila, one in Velemér (1378), western Hungary, and one in Martjanci (1392), northeastern Slovenia. In Italy Giotto di Bondone (1267–1337) included himself in the cycle of "eminent men" in the Castle of Naples, Masaccio (1401–1428) depicted himself as one of the apostles in the painting of the Brancacci Chapel, and Benozzo Gozzoli includes himself, with other portraits, in the Palazzo Medici Procession of the Magi (1459), with his name written on his hat. This is imitated a few years later by Sandro Botticelli, as a spectator of the Adoration of the Magi (1475), who turns from the scene to look at us. Fourteenth-century sculpted portrait busts of and by the Parler family in Prague Cathedral include self-portraits, and are among the earliest such busts of non-royal figures. Ghiberti included a small head of himself in his most famous work. Notably, the earliest self-portrait painted in England, other than in a manuscript, is the miniature painted in oils on panel by the German artist Gerlach Flicke, 1554.

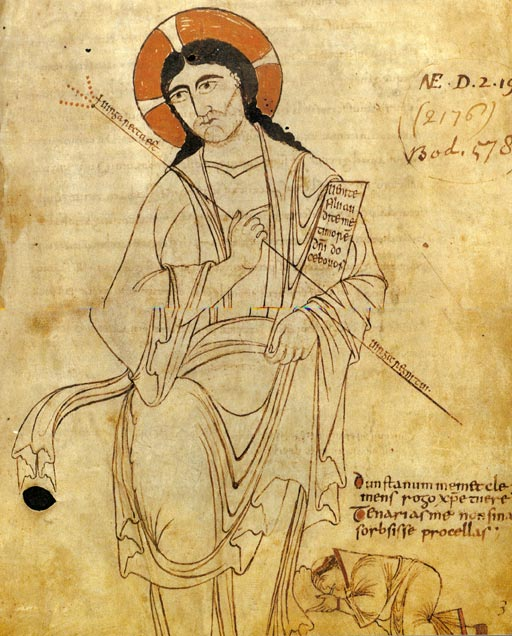
Saint Dunstan, then artist-Abbot of Glastonbury, prostrates himself before a giant Christ. Inscribed "Remember, I beg you, merciful Christ, to protect Dunstan, and do not permit the storms of the underworld to swallow me up". Later he became Archbishop of Canterbury. c. 950 (cropped at bottom).

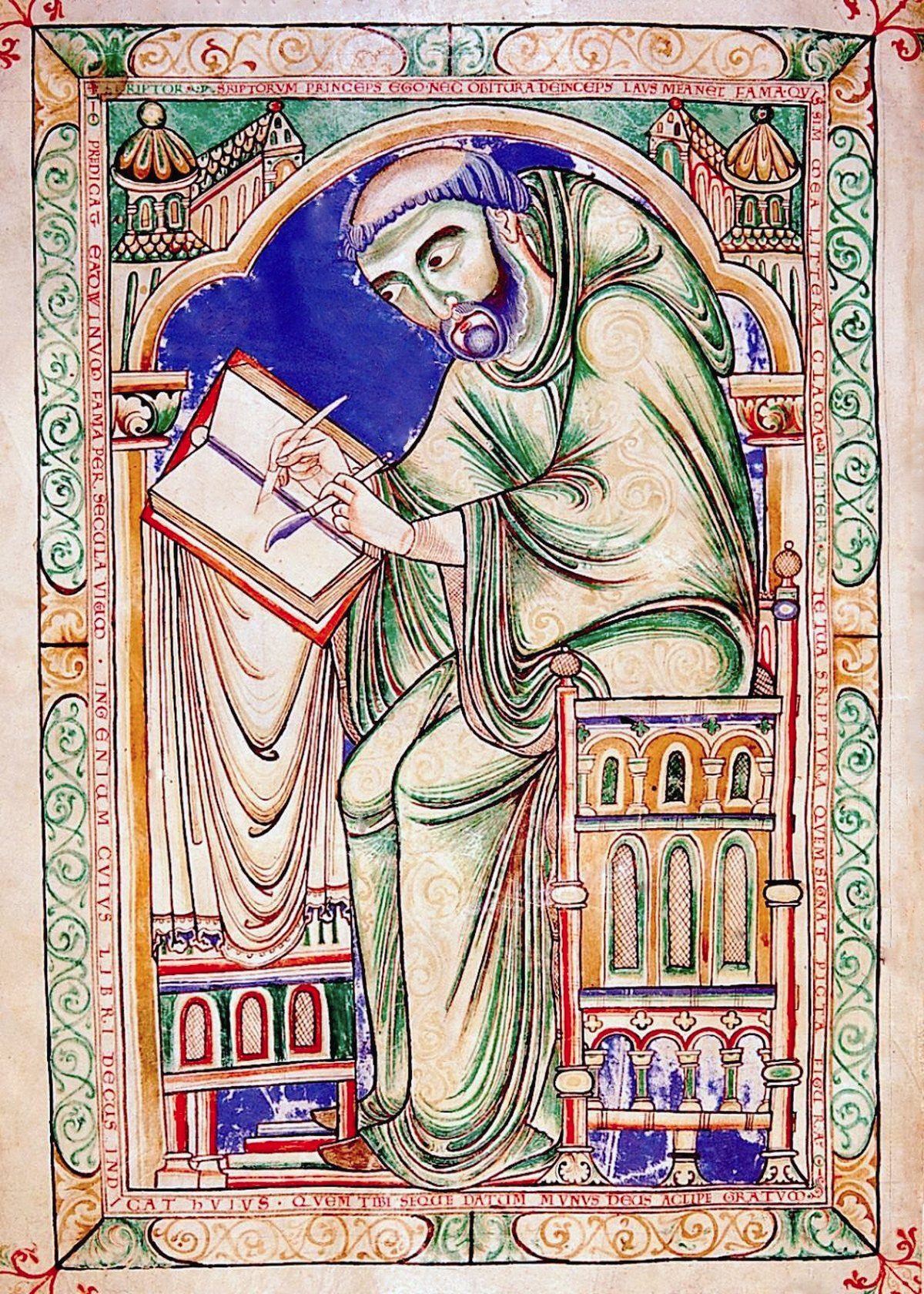
Eadwine the Scribe whose self portrait is accompanied by the inscription "I am the chief of scribes, and neither my praise nor fame shall die; shout out, oh my letter, who I may be. By its fame your script proclaims you, Eadwine, whom the painted figure represents, alive through the ages, whose genius the beauty of this book demonstrates. Receive, O God, the book and its donor as an acceptable gift." Canterbury, c. 1150s.

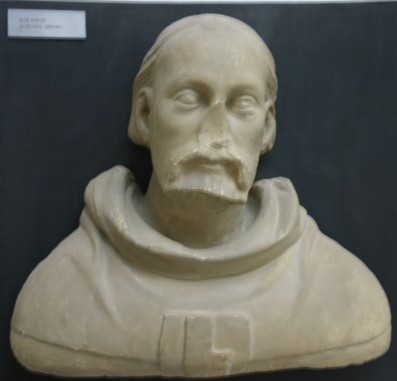
Peter Parler, late 14th century, from Prague Cathedral, where he was master architect and sculptor.

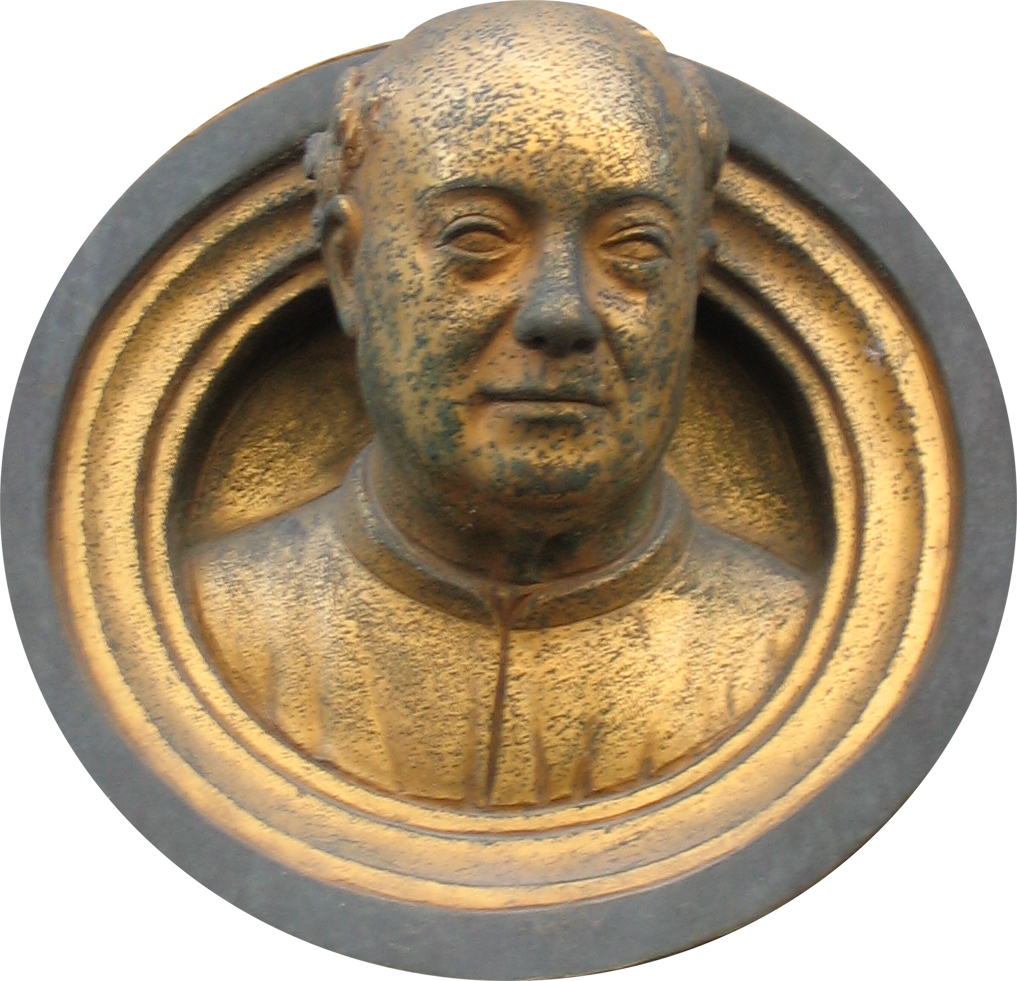
Lorenzo Ghiberti on the Gates of Paradise, Baptisterio, Florence self portrait, early 15th century

Jan van Eyck, Portrait of a Man in a Turban (actually a chaperon), 1433, National Gallery, generally regarded as a self-portrait, which would make it the earliest Western panel portrait after antiquity.

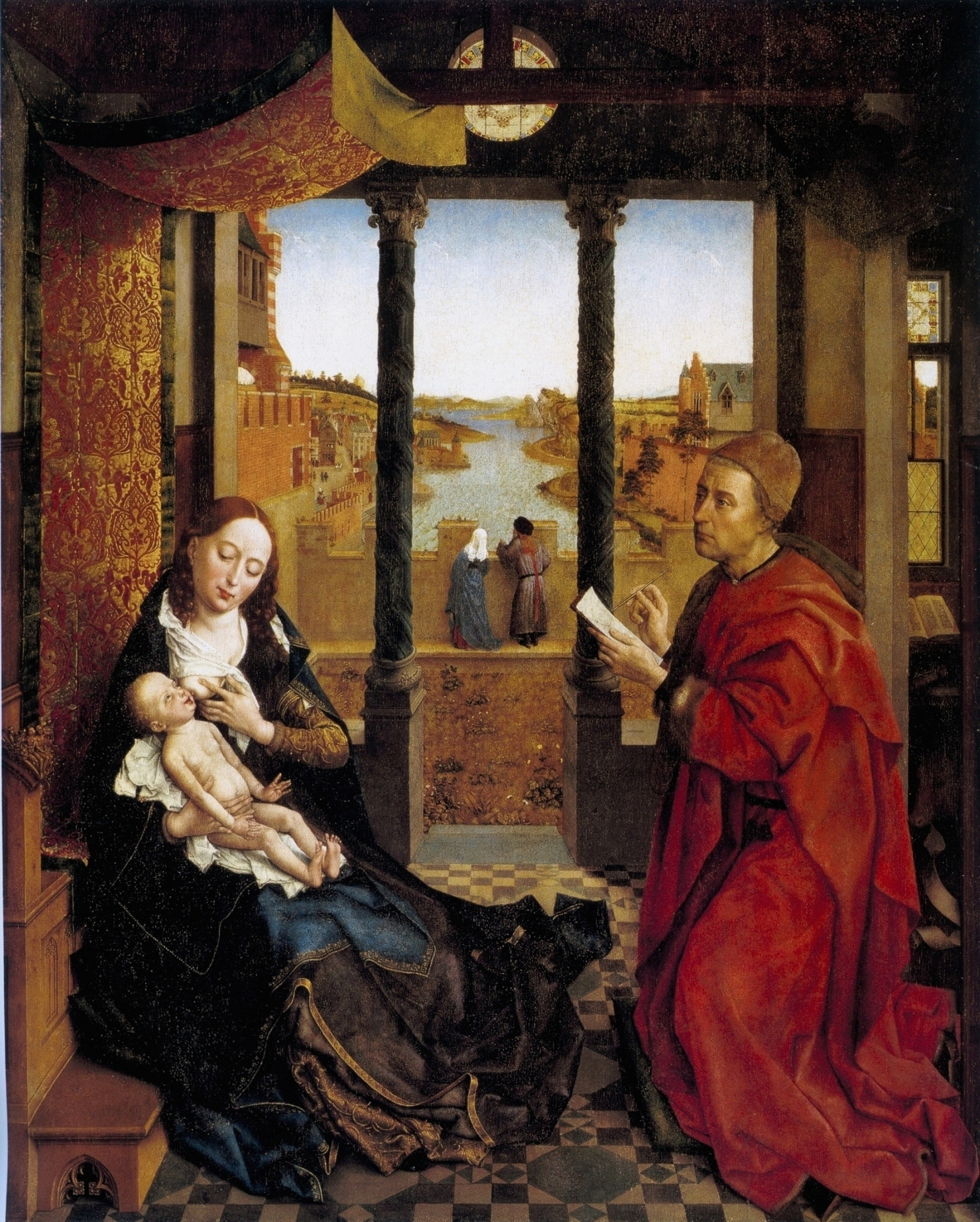
Rogier van der Weyden, as Saint Luke, makes a drawing for his painting of the Virgin. Boston, c. 1440.

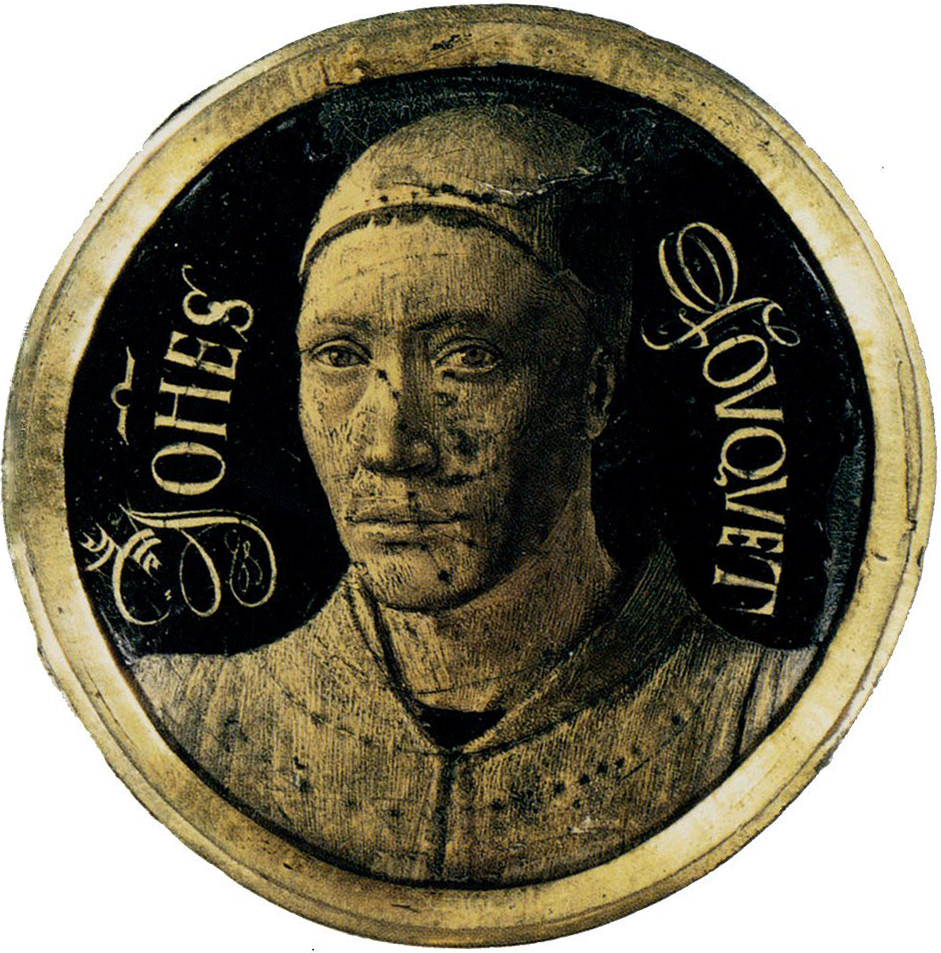
Jean Fouquet, c. 1450, a very early portrait miniature, and if the Van Eyck above is excluded, the oldest individual Western painted self-portrait.

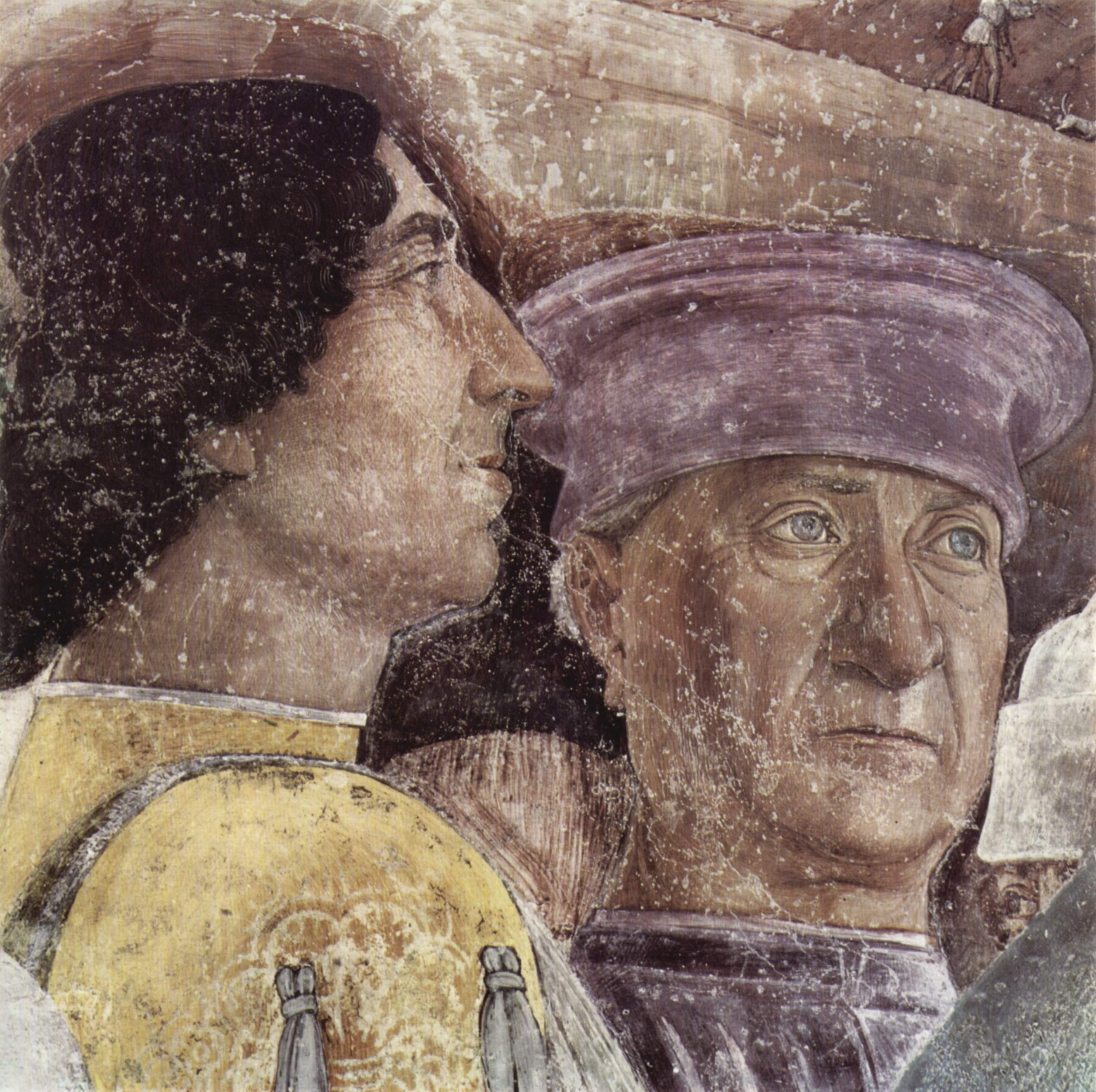
Andrea Mantegna, c. 1474, includes himself, as court artist, in his appropriate place in this fresco of the Gonzaga court.

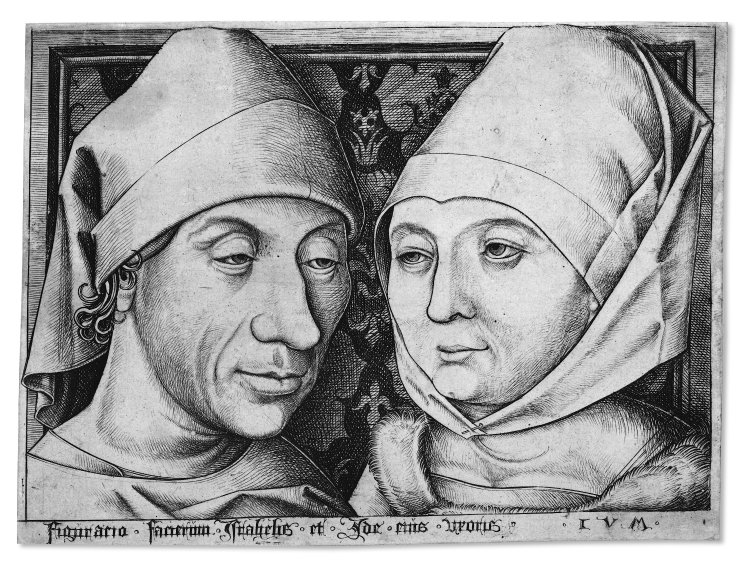
Israhel van Meckenem and his wife, engraving c. 1490, the earliest portrait print.

=== Albrecht Dürer, 1471–1528, the first prolific self-portraitist ===
Albrecht Dürer was an artist highly conscious of his public image and reputation, whose main income came from his old master prints, all containing his famous monogram, which were sold throughout Europe. He probably depicted himself more often than any artist before him, producing at least twelve images, including three oil portraits, and figures in four altarpieces. The earliest is a silverpoint drawing created when he was thirteen years old. At twenty-two Dürer painted Portrait of the Artist Holding a Thistle (1493, Louvre), probably to send to his new fiancée, Agnes Frey. The Madrid self-portrait (1498, Prado) depicts Dürer as a dandy in fashionable Italian dress, reflecting the international success he had achieved by then. In his last self-portrait, sold or given to the city of Nuremberg, and displayed publicly, which very few portraits then were, the artist depicted himself with an unmistakable resemblance to Jesus Christ (Munich, Alte Pinakothek). He later re-used the face in a religious engraving of, revealingly, the Veil of Veronica, Christ's own "self-portrait" (B.25). A self-portrait in gouache he sent to Raphael has not survived. A woodcut of a bathhouse and a drawing show virtually nude self-portraits.

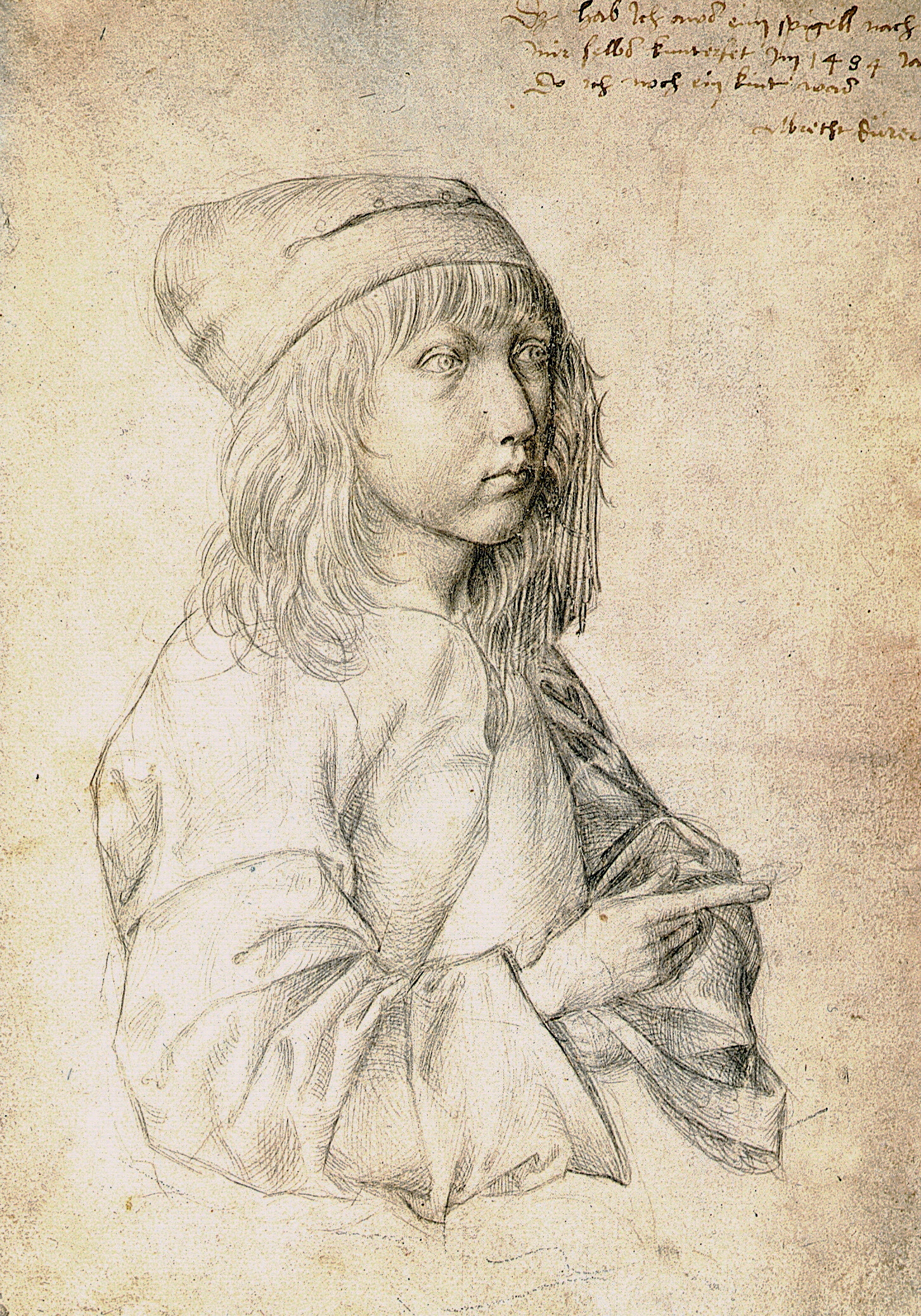
Dürer at thirteen, silverpoint, Albertina, 1484

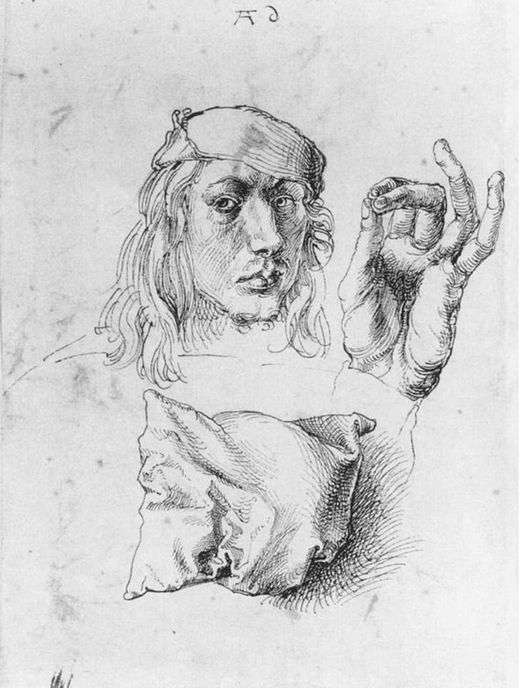
Dürer at about twenty, 1491–92, drawing, Metropolitan

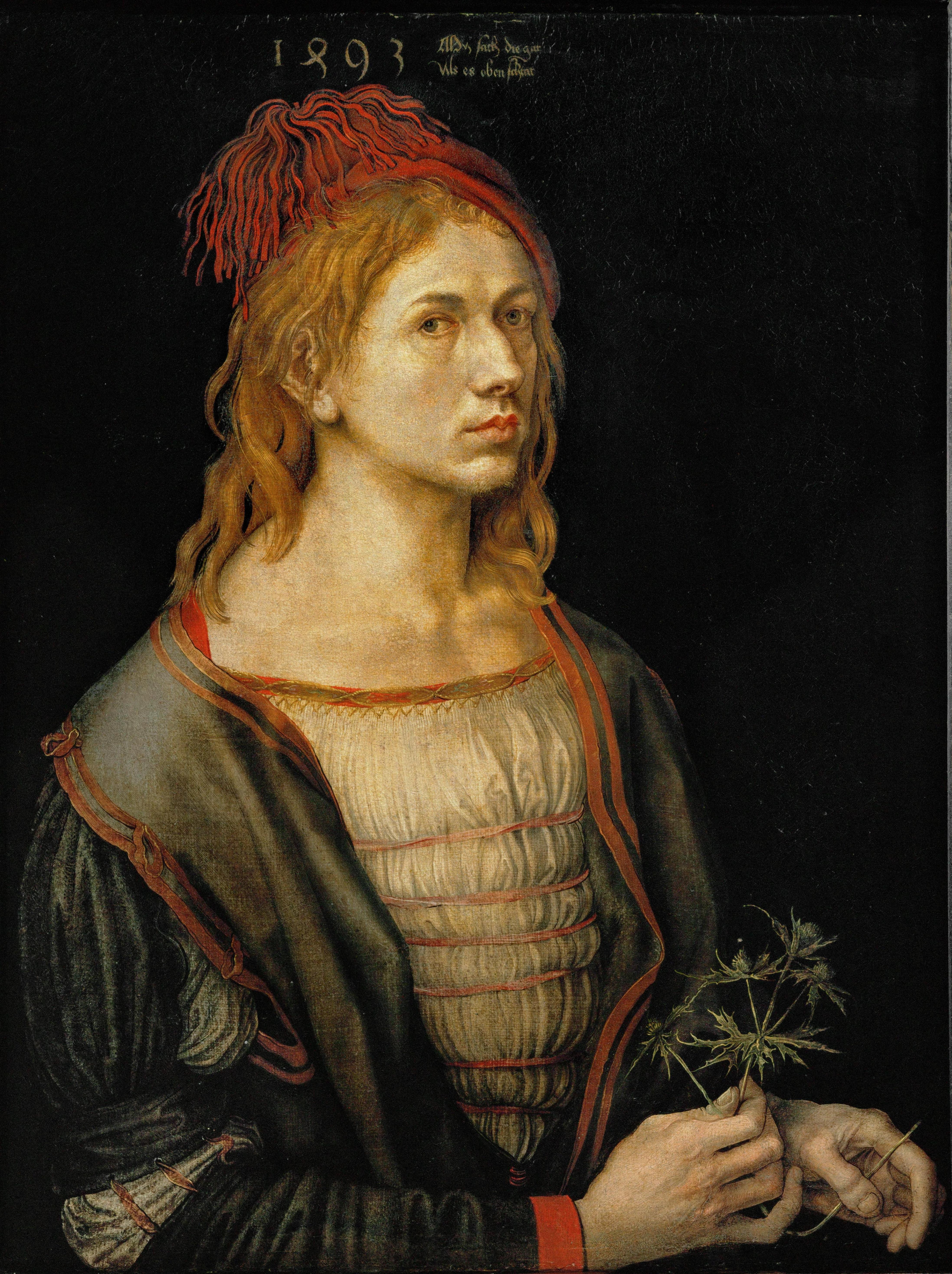
Albrecht Dürer Self-portrait 1493. oil, originally on vellum Louvre, Paris. This is among the earliest known formal self-portraits. He is dressed in Italian fashion, reflecting his international success.

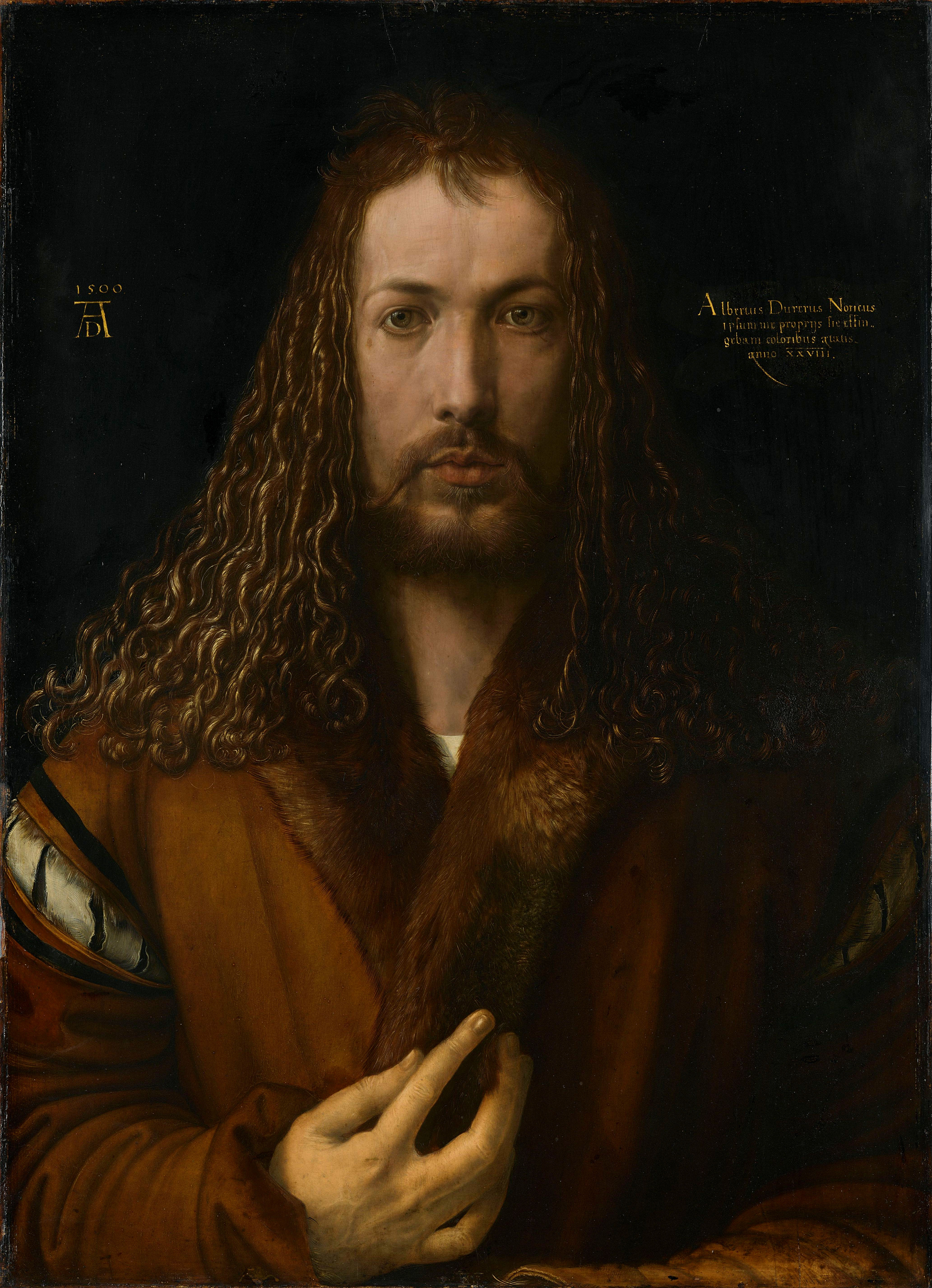
Dürer's last self-portrait, 1500—unmistakably Christ-like

=== Renaissance and Baroque ===
The great Italian painters of the Renaissance made comparatively few formal painted self-portraits, but often included themselves in larger works. Most individual self-portraits they have left were straightforward depictions; Dürer's showmanship was rarely followed, although a controversially attributed Self-portrait as David by Giorgione would have something of the same spirit, if it is a self-portrait. There is a portrait by Pietro Perugino of about 1500 (Collegio del Cambio of Perugia), and one by the young Parmigianino showing the view in a convex mirror. There is also a drawing by Leonardo da Vinci (1512), and self-portraits in larger works by Michelangelo, who gave his face to the skin of St. Bartholomew in the Last Judgement of the Sistine Chapel (1536–1541), and Raphael who is seen in the characters of School of Athens 1510, or with a friend who holds his shoulder (1518). Also notable are two portraits of Titian as an old man in the 1560s. Paolo Veronese appears as a violinist clothed in white in his Marriage at Cana, accompanied by Titian on the bass viol (1562). Northern artists continued to make more individual portraits, often looking very much like their other bourgeois sitters. Johan Gregor van der Schardt produced a painted terracotta bust of himself (c. 1573).

Titian's Allegory of Prudence (c. 1565–70) is thought to depict Titian, his son Orazio, and a young cousin, Marco Vecellio. Titian also painted a late self-portrait in 1567; apparently his first. Baroque artist Artemisia Gentileschi's La Pittura (Self-portrait as the allegory of painting) presents herself embodying the classical allegorical representation of Painting, seen in the dramatic mask worn around Gentileschi's neck which Painting often carries. The artist's focus on her work, away from the viewer, highlights the drama of the Baroque period, and the changing role of the artist from craftsperson to singular innovator. Caravaggio painted himself in Bacchus at the beginning of his career, then appears in the staffage of some of his larger paintings. Finally, the head of Goliath held by David (1605–10, Galleria Borghese) is Caravaggio's own.

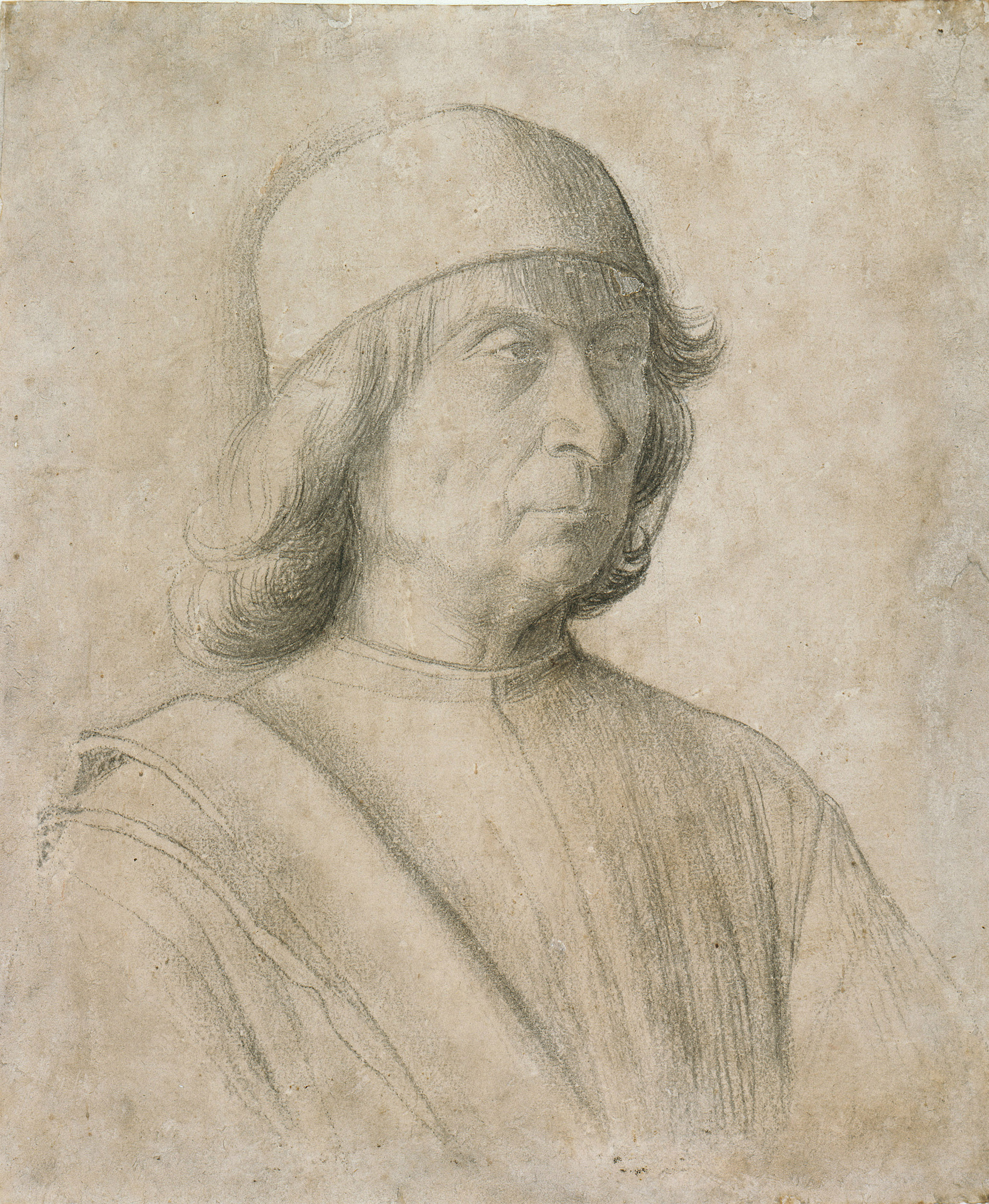
Gentile Bellini, black chalk, 1496 or earlier, Berlin

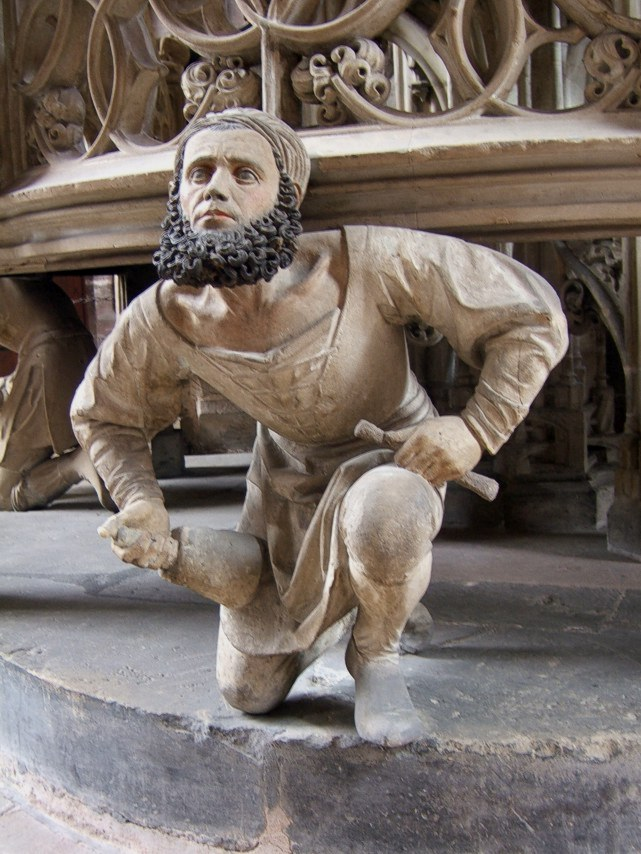
Nuremberg sculptor Adam Kraft, self-portrait from St Lorenz Church, 1490s.

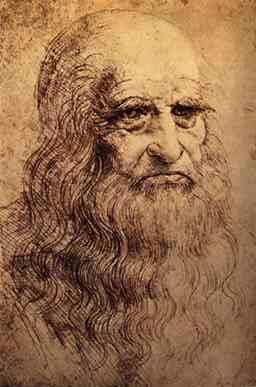
Probable self-portrait by Leonardo da Vinci, c. 1512–1515

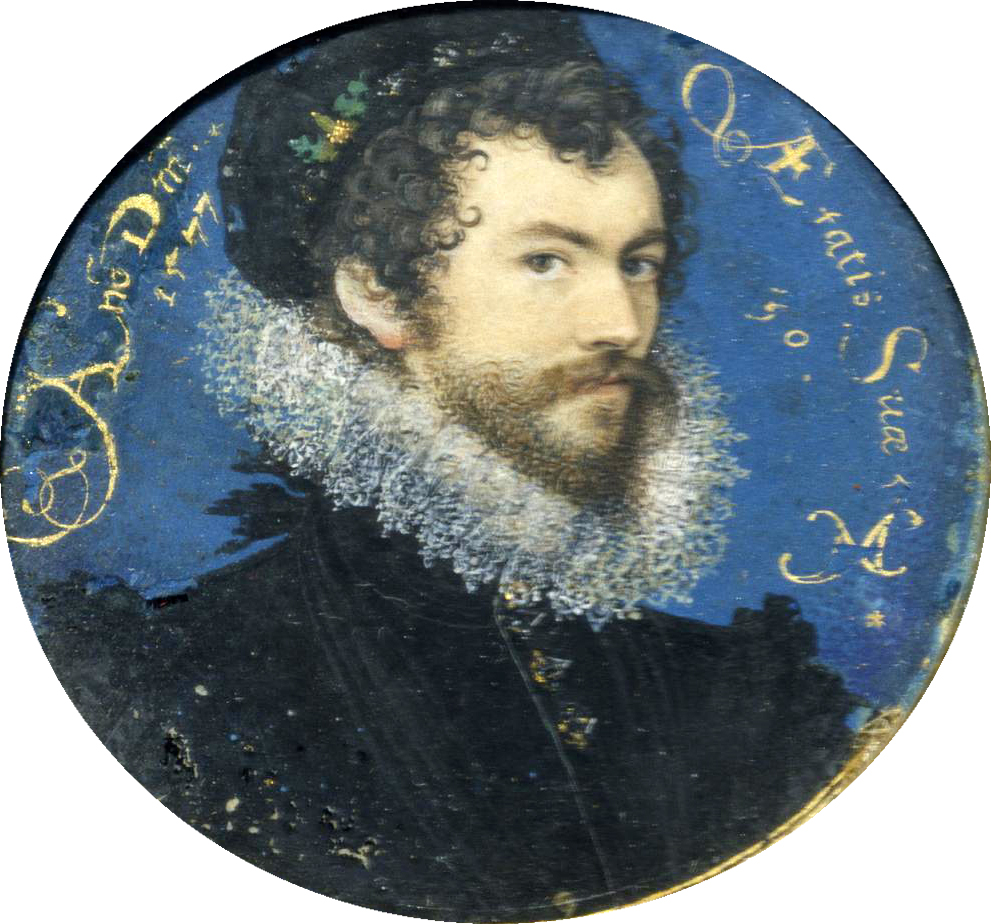
Nicholas Hilliard, self-portrait miniature, 1577

=== Rembrandt and the 17th century in Northern Europe ===
In the 17th century, Flemish and Dutch artists painted themselves far more often than before; by this date most successful artists had a position in society where a member of any other trade would consider having their portrait painted. Many also included their families, again following the normal practice for the middle-classes. Mary Beale, Anthony van Dyck and Peter Paul Rubens produced numerous images of themselves, the latter also often painting his family. This practice was especially common for female artists, whose inclusion of their families was often a deliberate attempt to mitigate criticism of their profession causing distraction from their "natural role" as mothers.

Rembrandt drew and painted dozens of self-portraits, as well as portraits of his wife, son, and mistress. At one time about ninety paintings were counted as Rembrandt self-portraits, but it is now known that he had his students copy his own self-portraits as part of their training. Modern scholarship has reduced the autograph count to something over forty paintings, a few drawings, and thirty-one etchings. Many show him posing in quasi-historical fancy dress, or pulling faces at himself. His oil paintings trace the progress from an uncertain young man to the dapper and very successful portrait-painter of the 1630s to the troubled but massively powerful portraits of his old age.

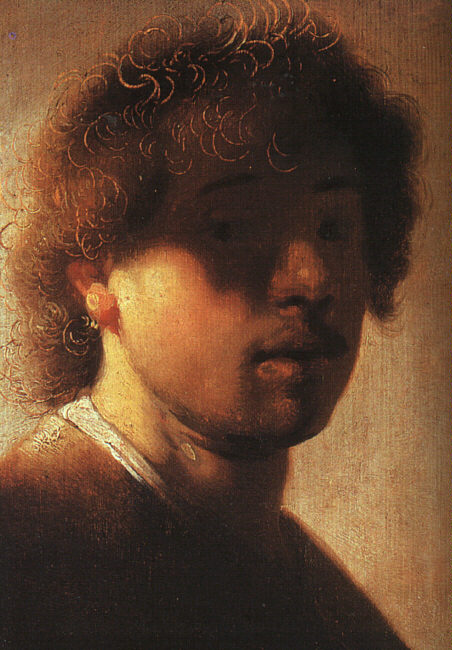
A young Rembrandt, c. 1628, when he was 22. Partly an exercise in chiaroscuro. Rijksmuseum

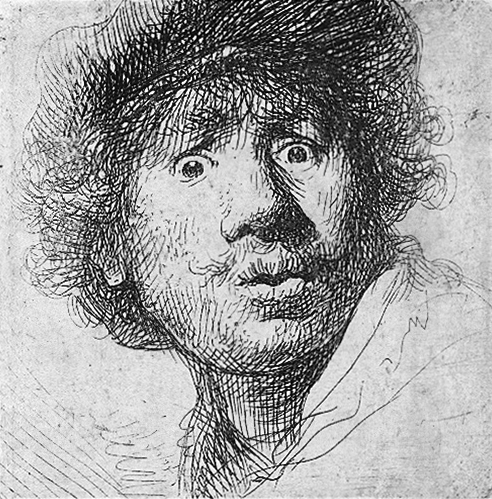
Etching and burin, c. 1630. Probably an exercise in capturing facial expressions for larger paintings.

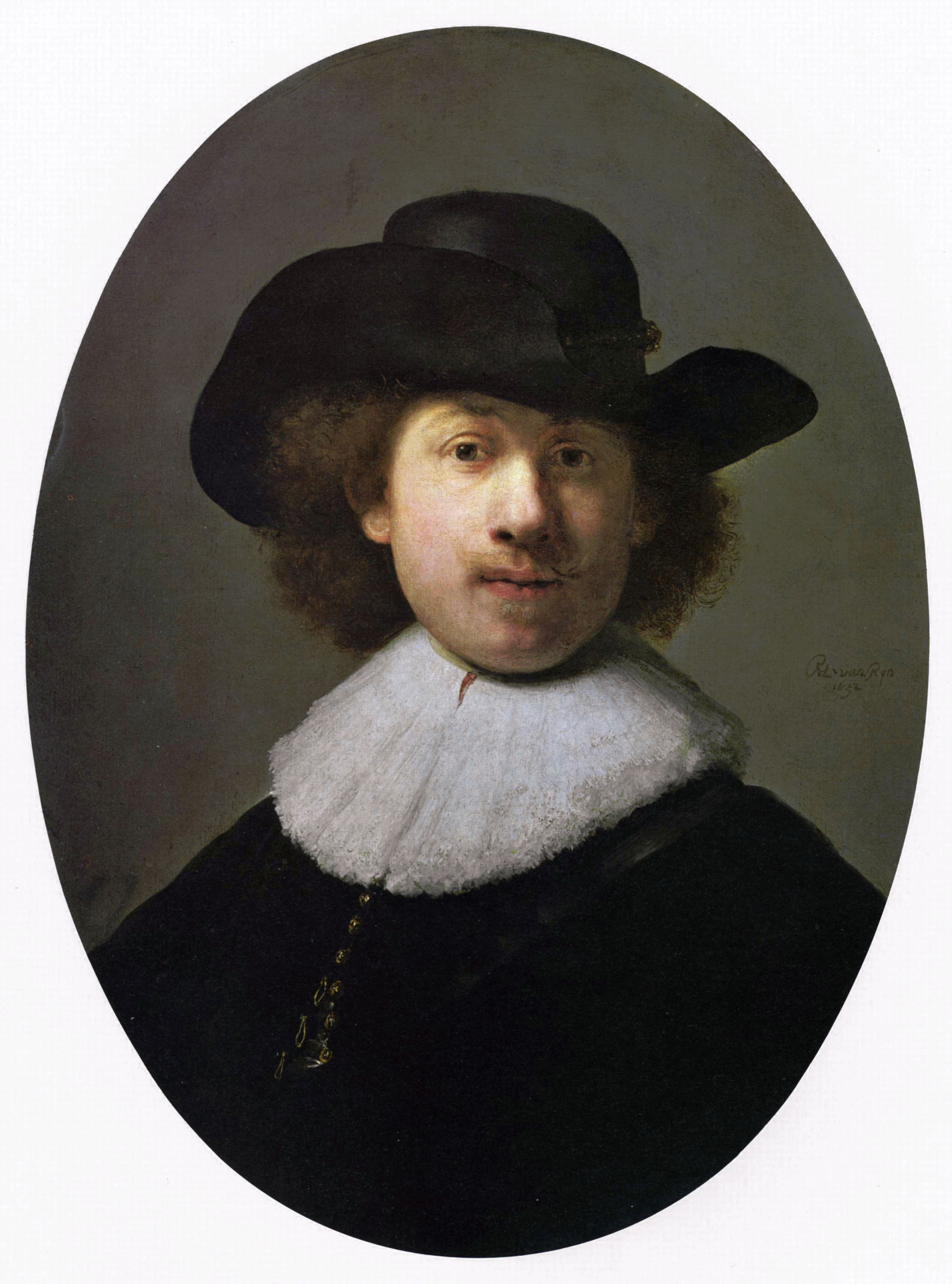
Rembrandt in 1632, when he was enjoying great success as a fashionable portraitist in this style.

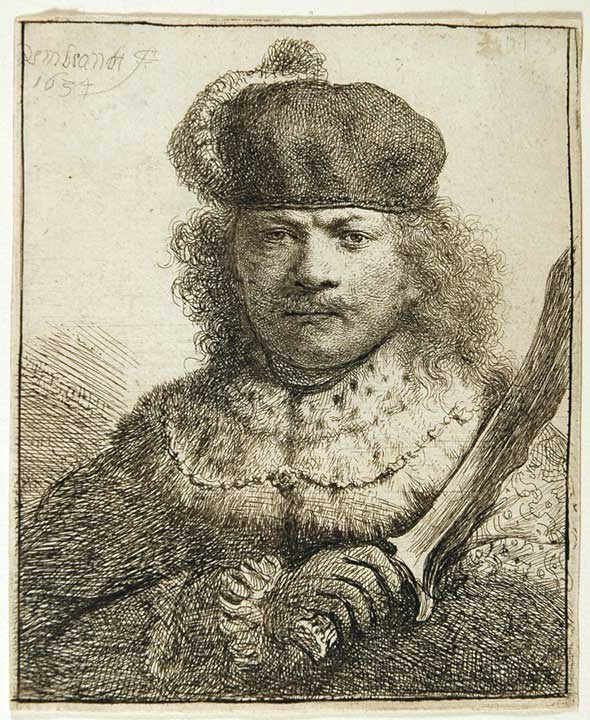
Role-playing in Self-portrait as an oriental Potentate with a Kris, etching, 1634.

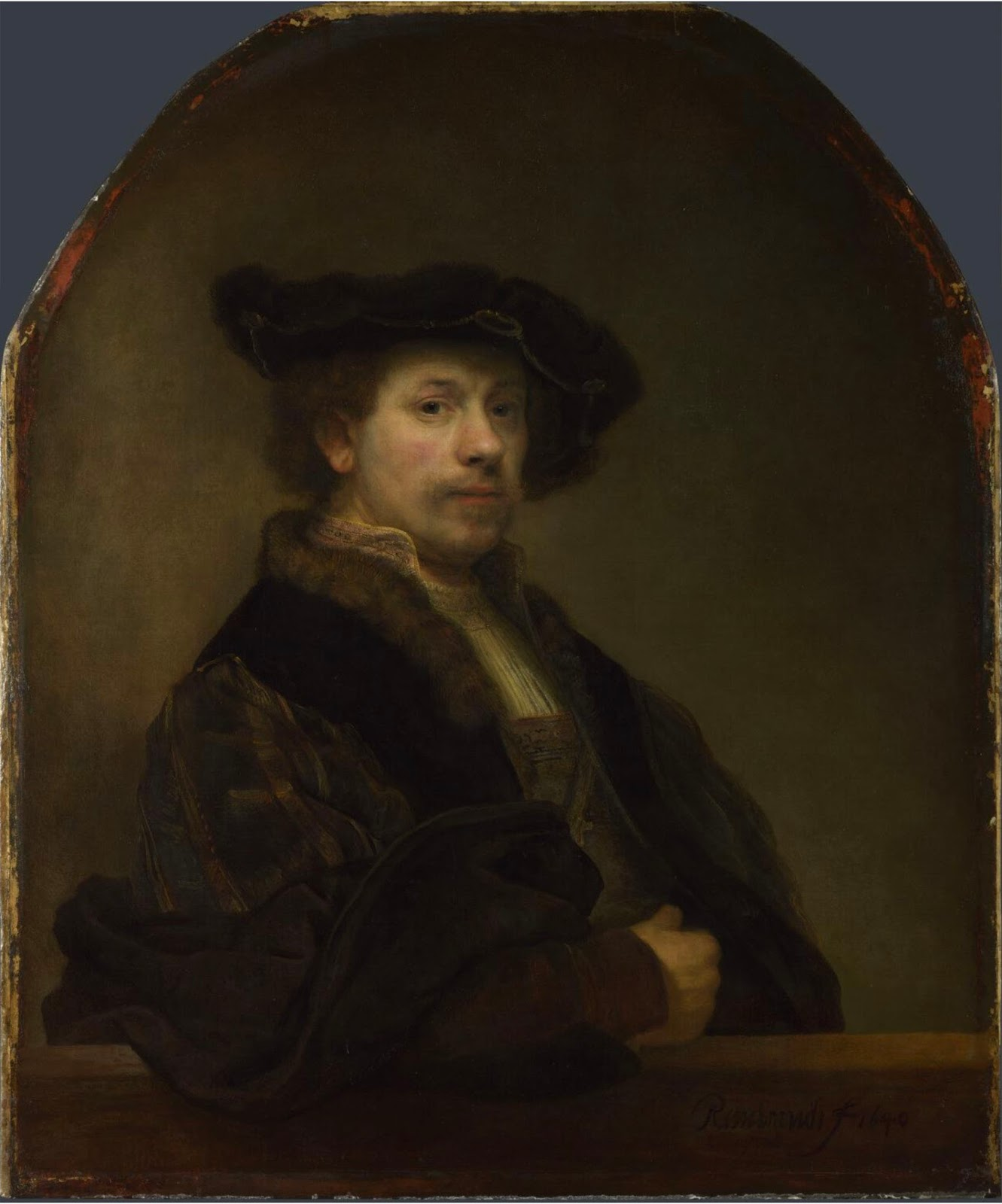
1640, wearing a costume in the style of over a century earlier. National Gallery

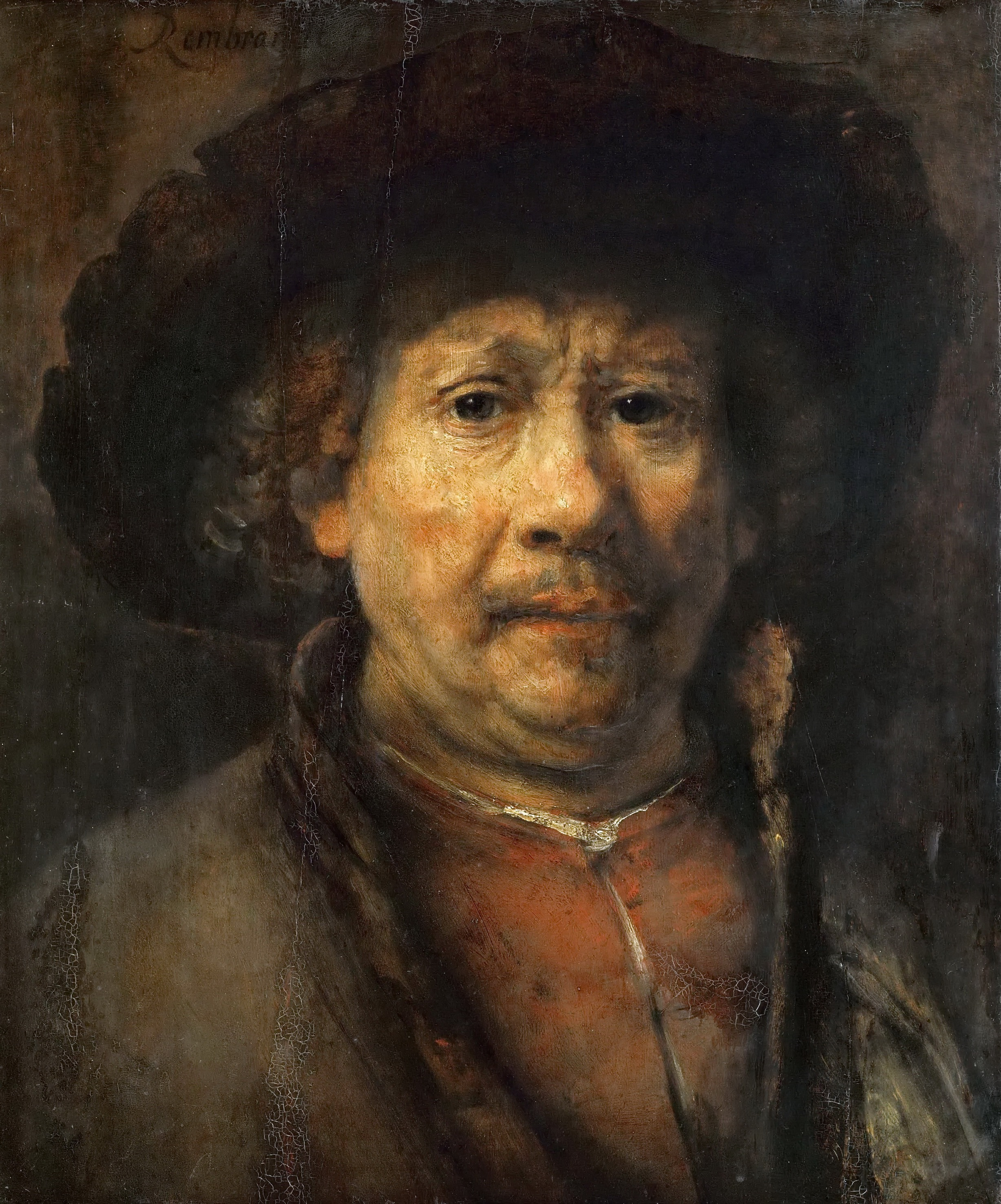
Vienna c. 1655, oil on walnut, cut down in size.

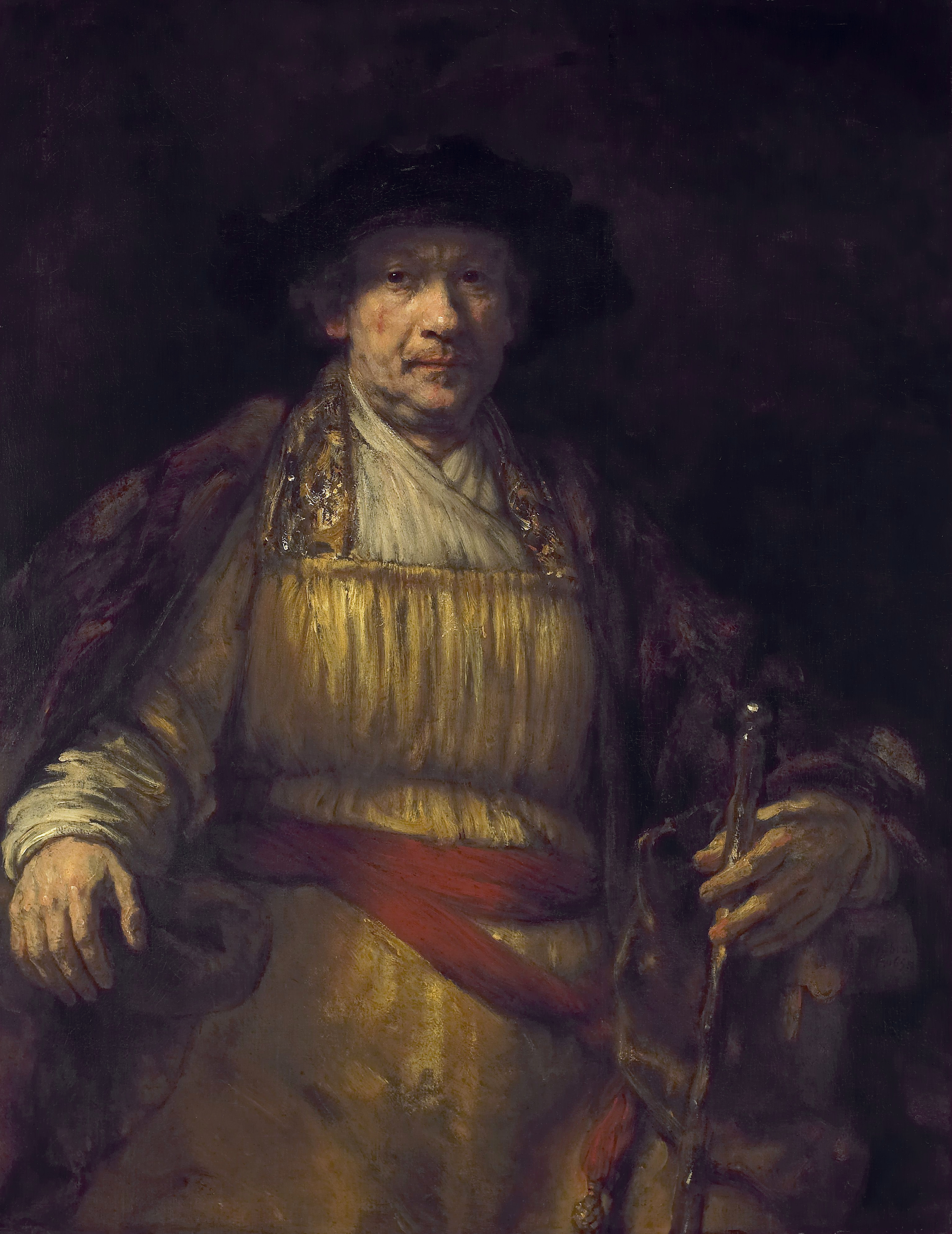
Again in antique costume, 1658, Oil on canvas Frick Collection. His largest self-portrait, for which a new mirror may have been used.

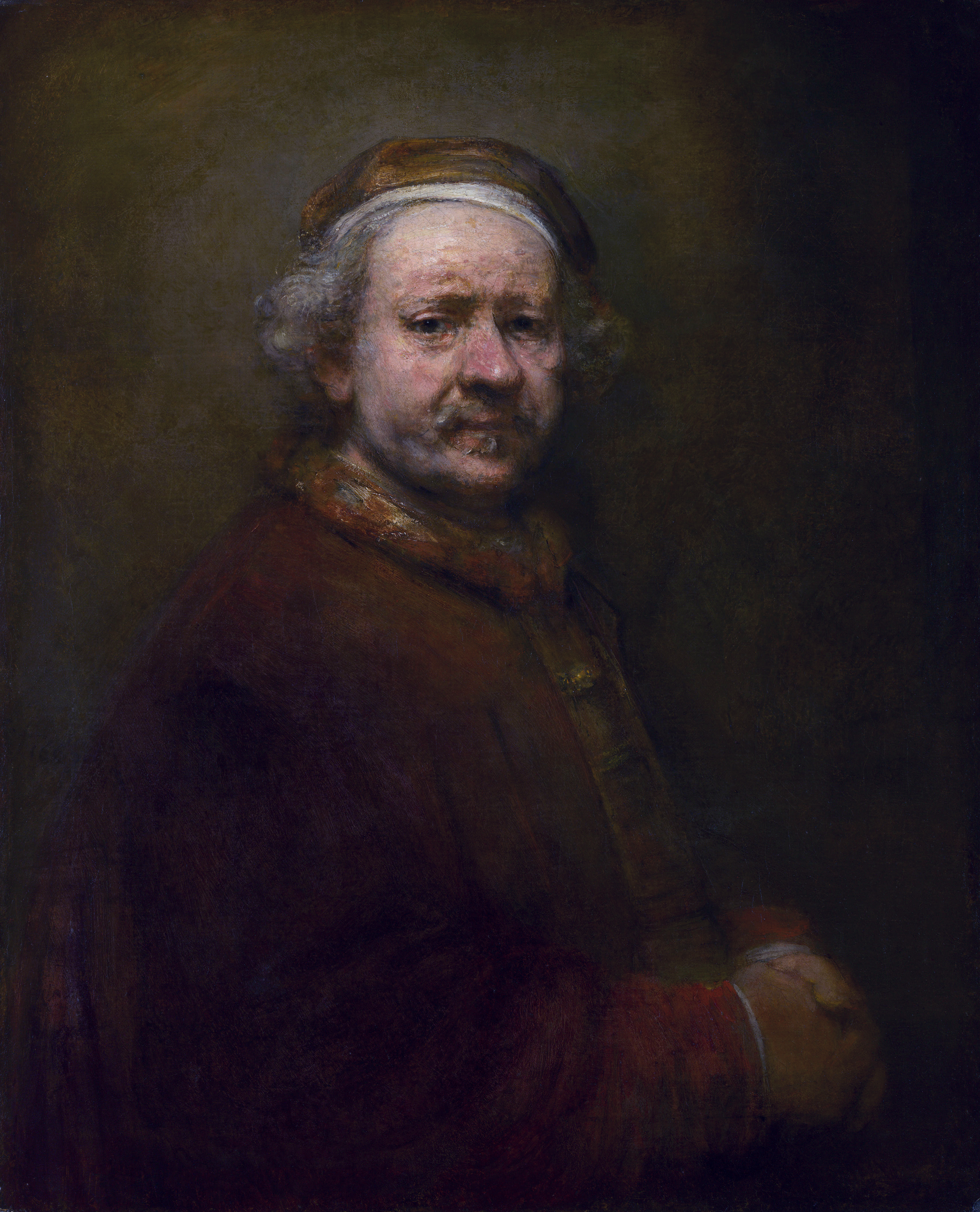
Dated 1669, the year he died, though he looks much older in other portraits. National Gallery, London

=== After Rembrandt ===
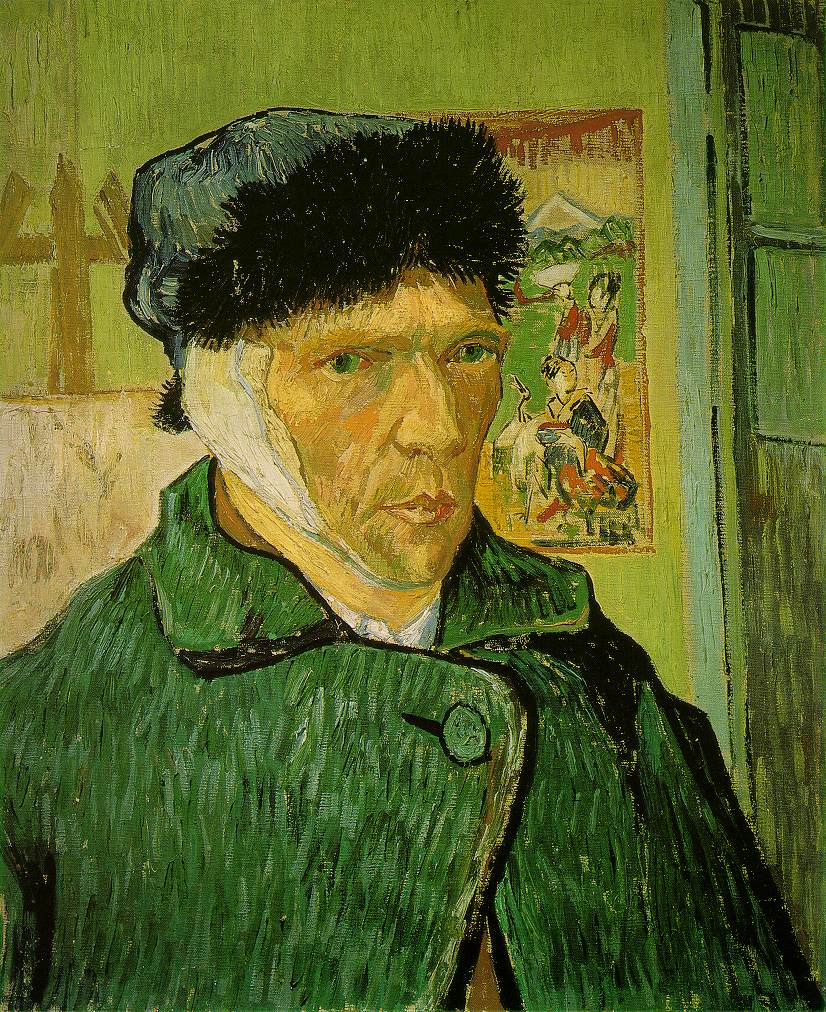
Self-Portrait of Van Gogh with head bandaged, after he (debatedly) cut off part of his ear.

In Spain, there were self-portraits of Bartolomé Estéban Murillo and Diego Velázquez. Francisco de Zurbarán represented himself in Luke the Evangelist at the feet of Christ on the cross (around 1635). In the 19th century, Goya painted himself numerous times. French self-portraits, at least after Nicolas Poussin tend to show the social status of the artist, although Jean-Baptiste-Siméon Chardin and some others instead showed their real working costume very realistically. This was a decision all 18th-century self-portraitists needed to make, although many painted themselves in both formal and informal costume in different paintings. Thereafter, one can say that most significant painters left us at least one self-portrait, even after the decline of the painted portrait with the arrival of photography. Gustave Courbet (see below) was perhaps the most creative self-portraitist of the 19th century, and The Artist's studio and Bonjour, Monsieur Courbet are perhaps the largest self-portraits ever painted. Both contain many figures, but are firmly centred on the heroic figure of the artist.

=== Prolific modern self-portraitists ===
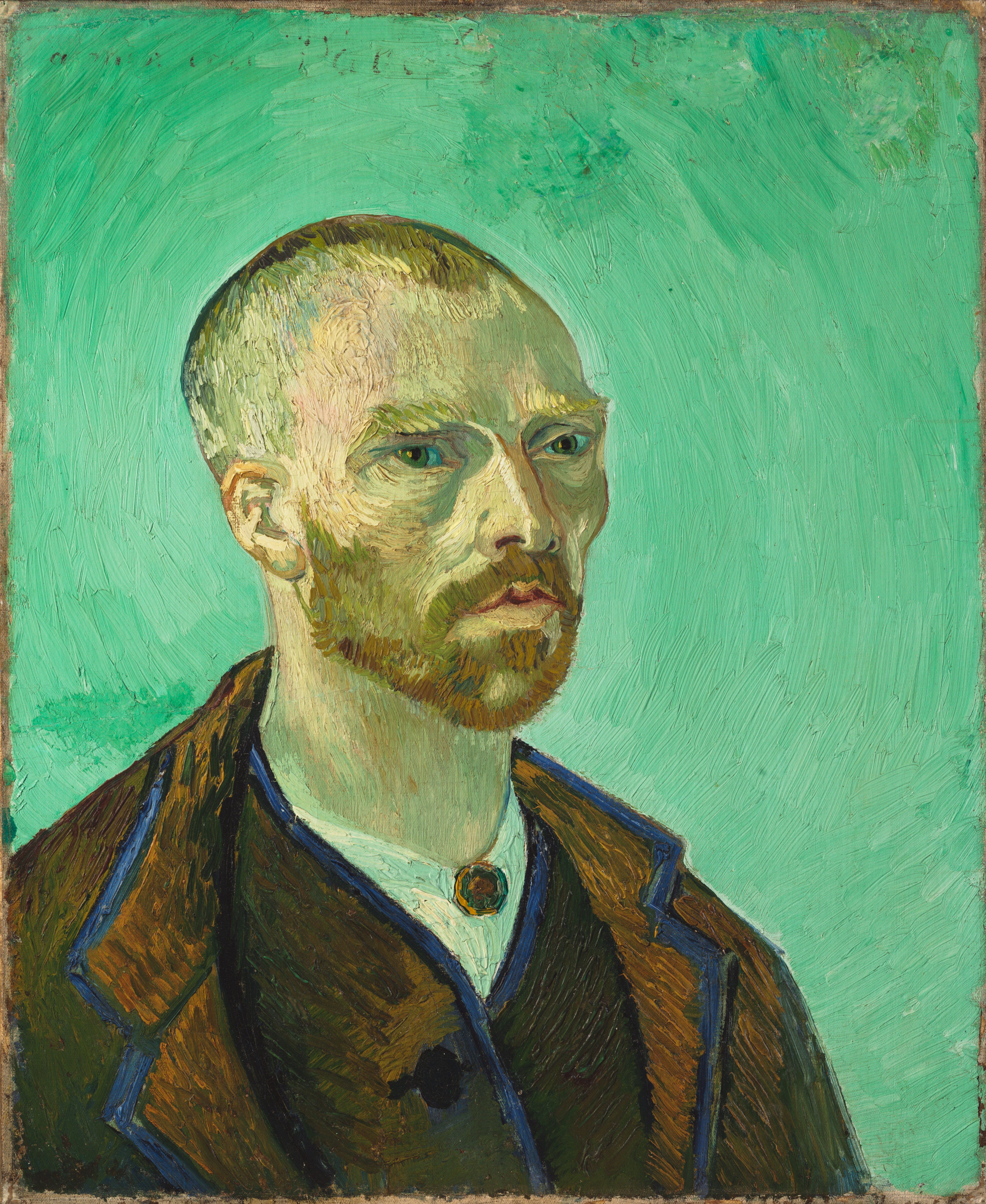
Vincent van Gogh, Self Portrait, dedicated to Gauguin, 1888

One of the most famous and most prolific of self-portraitists was Vincent van Gogh, who drew and painted himself more than 43 times between 1886 and 1889. In all of these self-portraits one is struck that the gaze of the painter is seldom directed at the viewer; even when it is a fixed gaze, he seems to look elsewhere. These paintings vary in intensity and color and some portray the artist with bandages; representing the episode in which he severed one of his ears.

The many self-portraits of Egon Schiele set new standards of openness, or perhaps exhibitionism, representing him naked in many positions, sometimes masturbating or with an erection, as in Eros (1911). Stanley Spencer was to follow somewhat in this vein. Max Beckmann was a prolific painter of self-portraits as was Edvard Munch who made great numbers of self-portrait paintings (70), prints (20) and drawings or watercolours (over 100) throughout his life, many showing him being badly treated by life, and especially by women. Obsessively using the self-portrait as a personal and introspective artistic expression was Horst Janssen, who produced hundreds of self-portraits depicting him a wide range of contexts most notably in relation to sickness, moodiness and death. The 2004 exhibition "Schiele, Janssen. Selbstinszenierung, Eros, Tod" (Schiele, Janssen: Self-dramatisation, Eros, Death) at the Leopold Museum in Vienna paralleled the works of Egon Schiele and Horst Janssen, both heavily drawing on sujets of erotica and death in combination with relentless self-portraiture. Frida Kahlo, who following a terrible accident spent many years bedridden, with only herself for a model, was another painter whose self-portraits depict great pain, in her case physical as well as mental. Her 55-odd self-portraits include many of herself from the waist up, and also some nightmarish representations which symbolize her physical sufferings.

Throughout his long career, Pablo Picasso often used self-portraits to depict himself in the many different guises, disguises and incarnations of his autobiographical artistic persona. From the young unknown "Yo Picasso" period to the "Minotaur in the Labyrinth" period, to the "old Cavalier" and the "lecherous old artist and model" periods. Often Picasso's self-portraits depicted and revealed complicated psychological insights, both personal and profound about the inner state and well-being of the artist. Another artist who painted personal and revealing self-portraits throughout his career was Pierre Bonnard. Bonnard also painted dozens of portraits of his wife Marthe throughout her life as well. Vincent van Gogh, Paul Gauguin, Egon Schiele and Horst Janssen in particular made intense (at times disturbingly so) and self-revealing self-portraits throughout their careers.

== Self-portraits in general ==
=== Gallery: painters at work ===
Gustave Courbet, The Painter's Studio: A Real Allegory of a Seven Year Phase in my Artistic (and Moral) Life, 1855, Musée d'Orsay

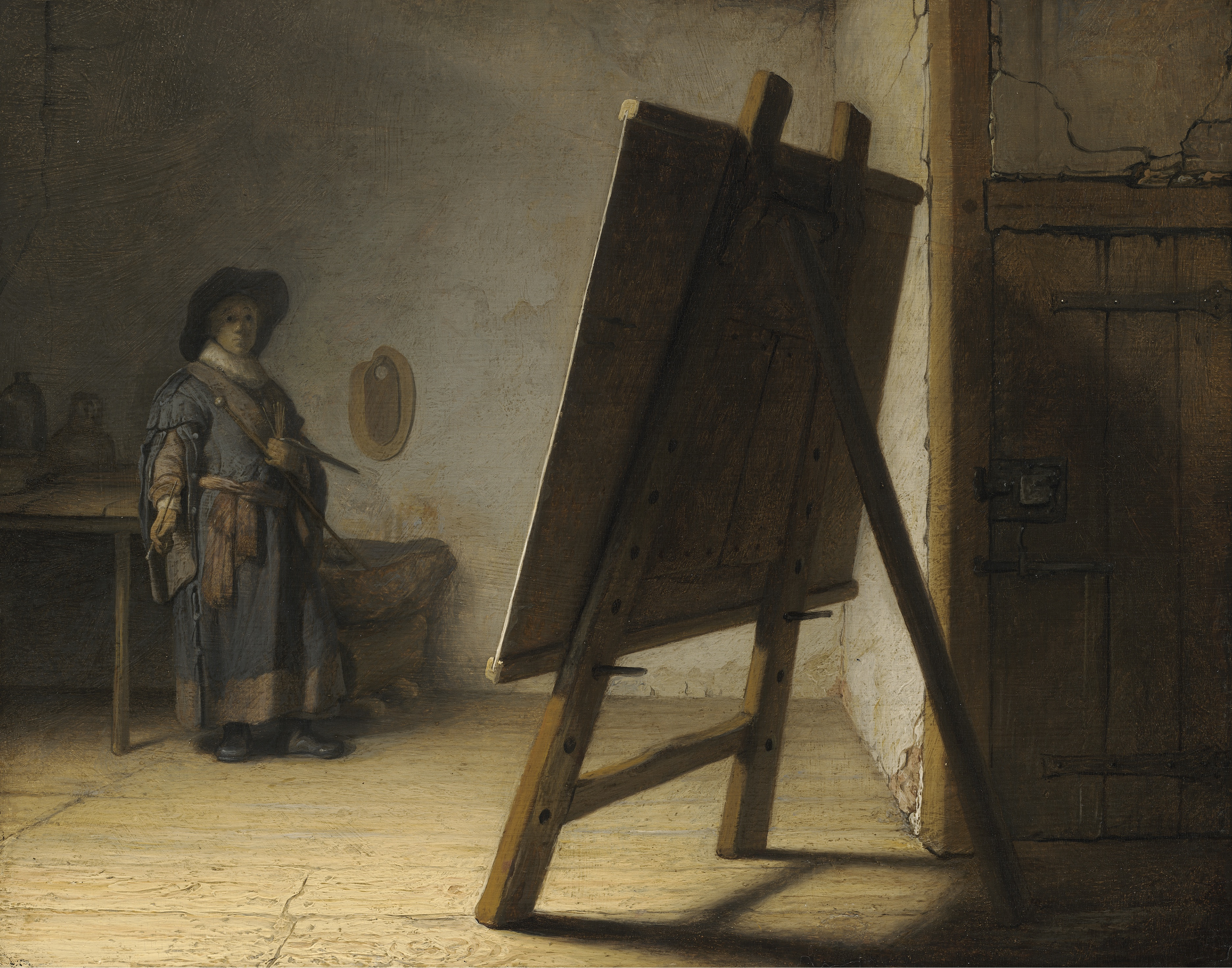
Rembrandt, The Artist in his Studio, 1628, Museum of Fine Arts, Boston

Many of the medieval portraits show the artist at work, and Jan van Eyck (above) his chaperon hat has the parts normally hanging loose tied up on his head, giving the misleading impression he is wearing a turban, presumably for convenience whilst he paints. In the early modern period, increasingly, men as well as women who painted themselves at work had to choose whether to present themselves in their best clothes, and best room, or to depict studio practice realistically. See also the Gallery of Women painters above.

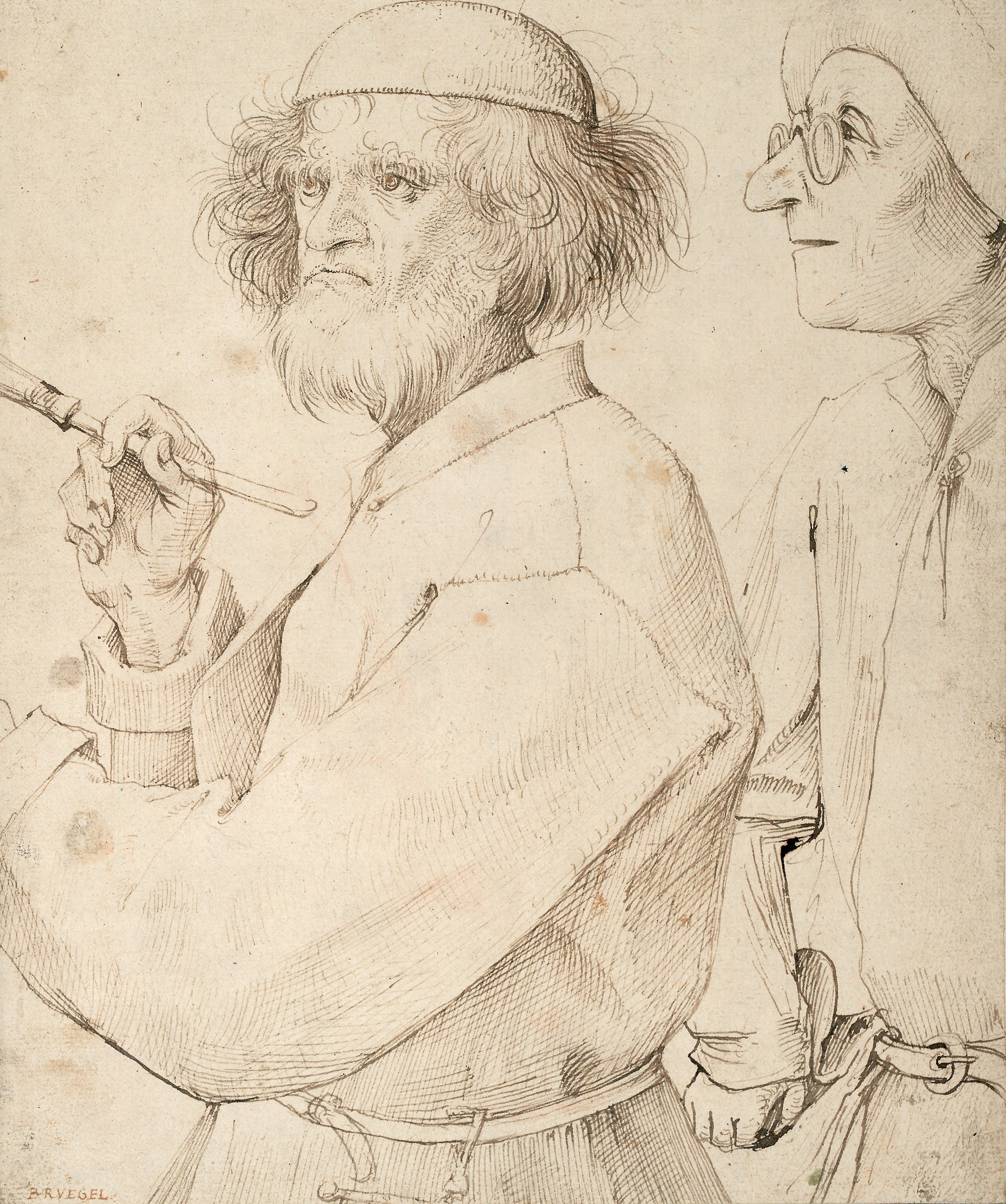
Pieter Brueghel the Elder, The Painter and The Buyer, c. 1565, pen and ink on brown paper, presumed to be a self-portrait. Antwerp

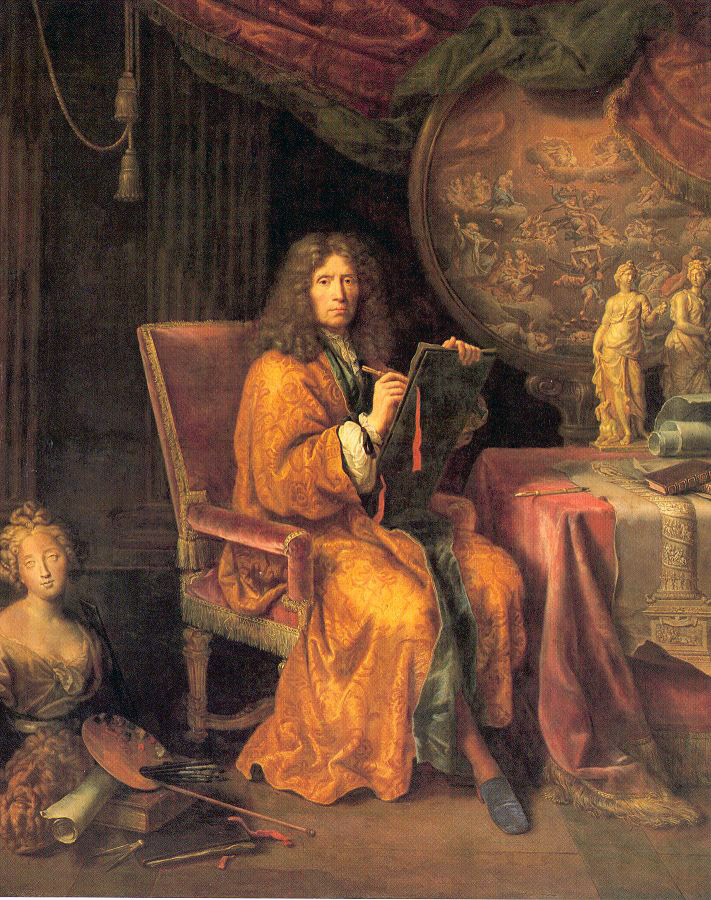
Pierre Mignard, 1690, Louvre.

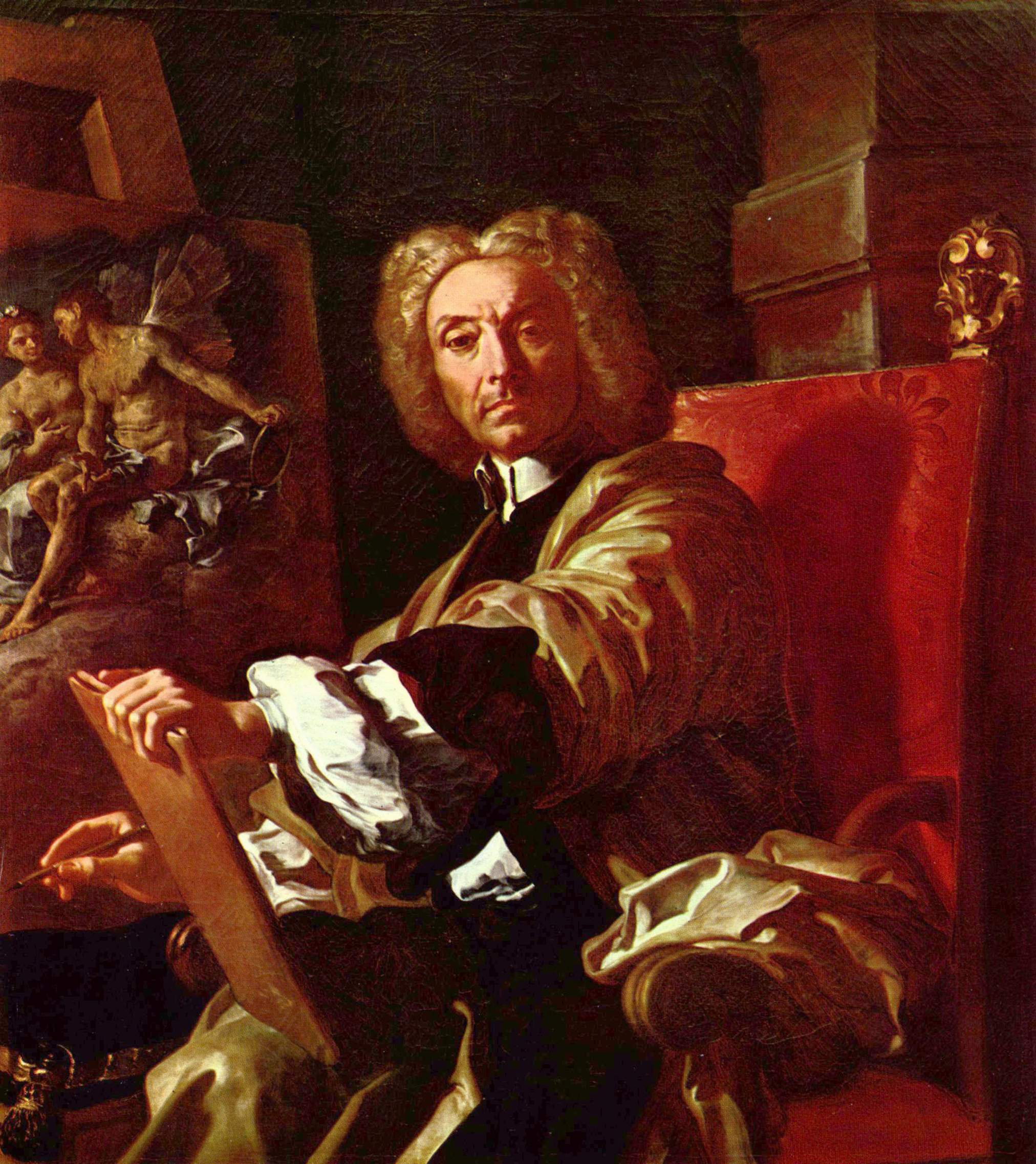
Francesco Solimena, c. 1715.

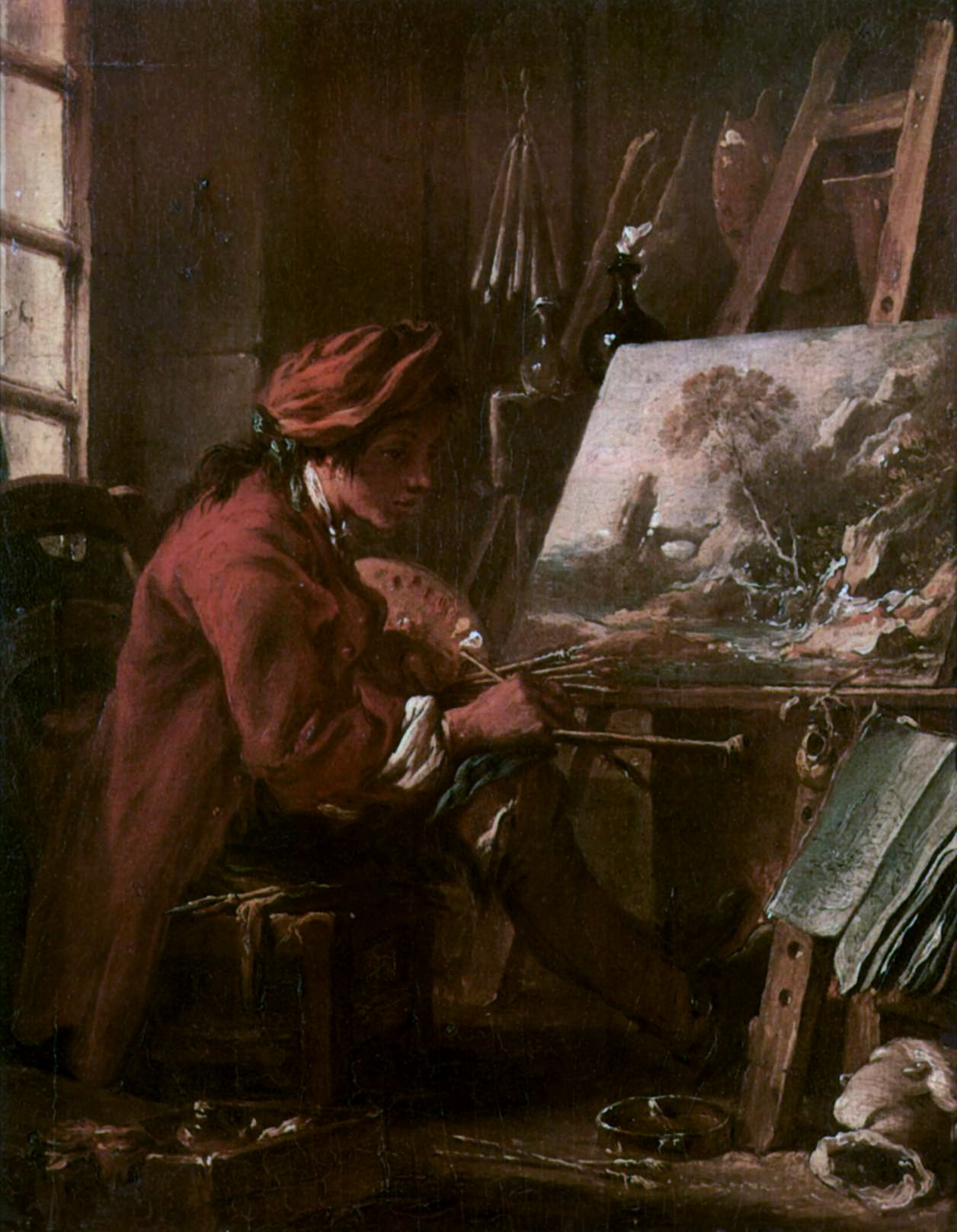
François Boucher, self-portrait in the studio, 1720

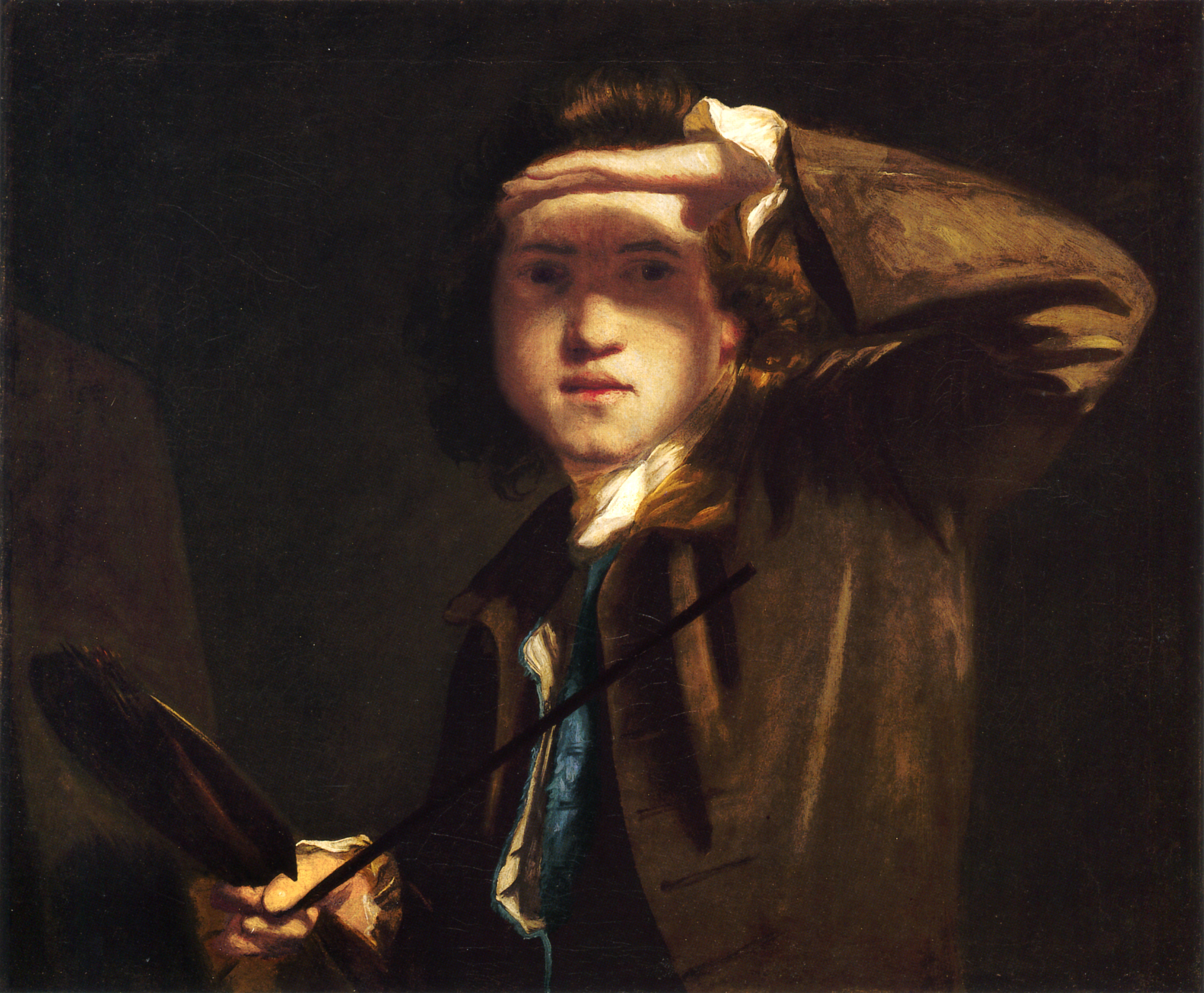
Joshua Reynolds, National Portrait Gallery, 1748. The artist as visionary. Much cut down, this originally had a vertical format.

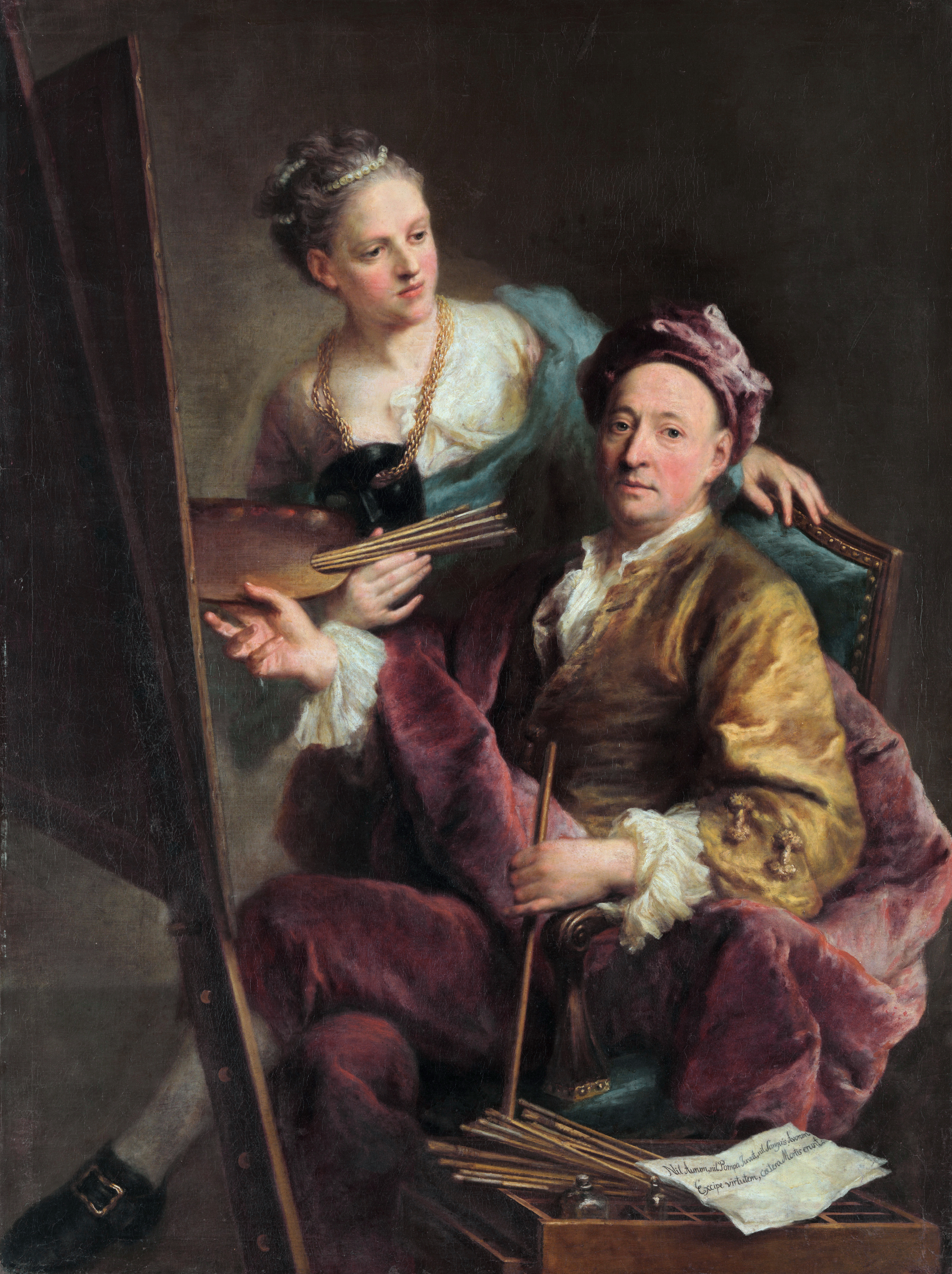
George Desmarées and his daughter, 1750, Munich.

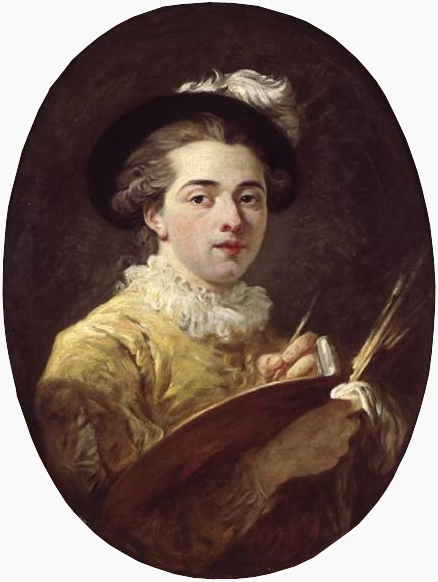
Jean-Honoré Fragonard, Self-portrait with Palette and Brushes, 1769

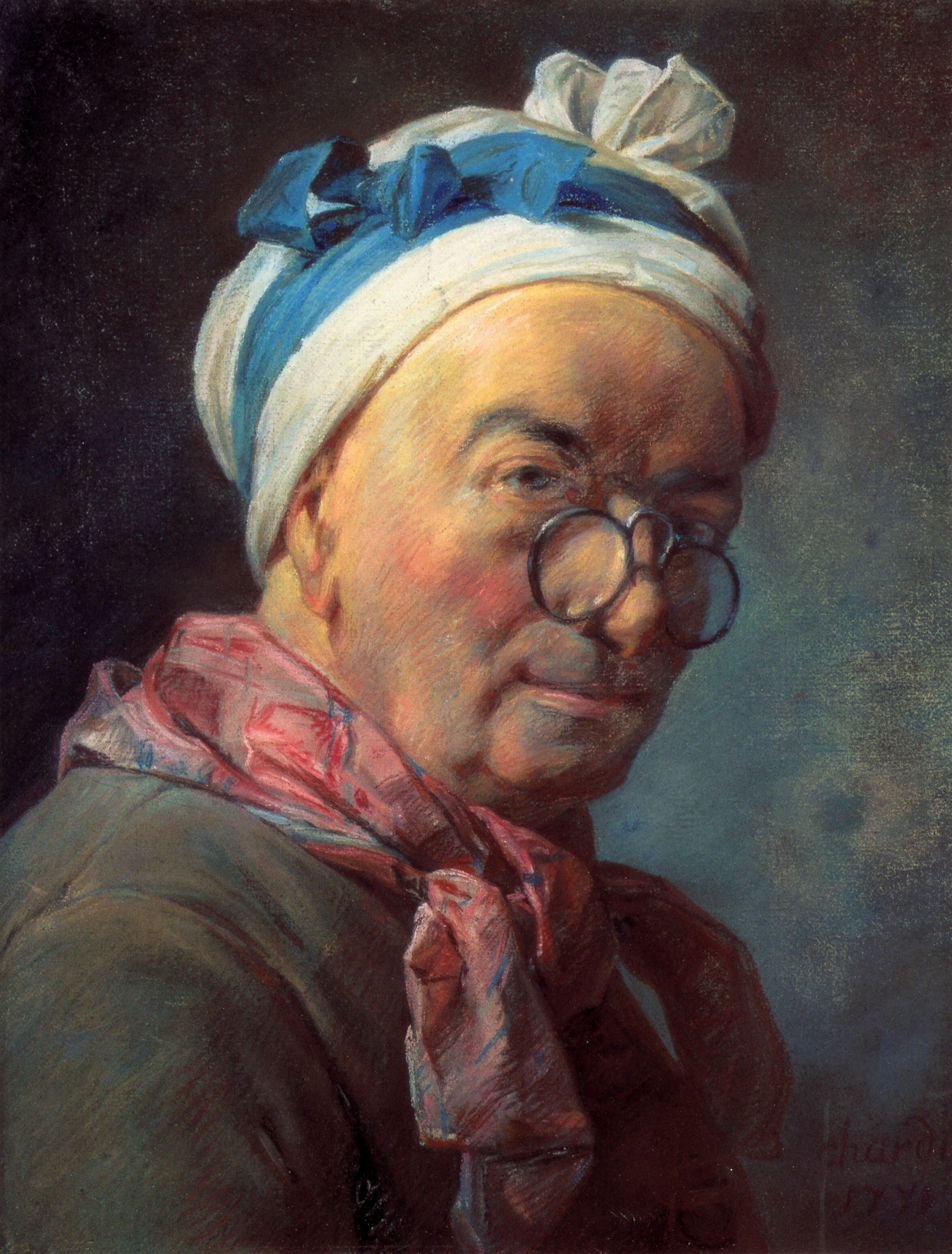
Jean-Baptiste-Siméon Chardin (1771), in his painting clothes.

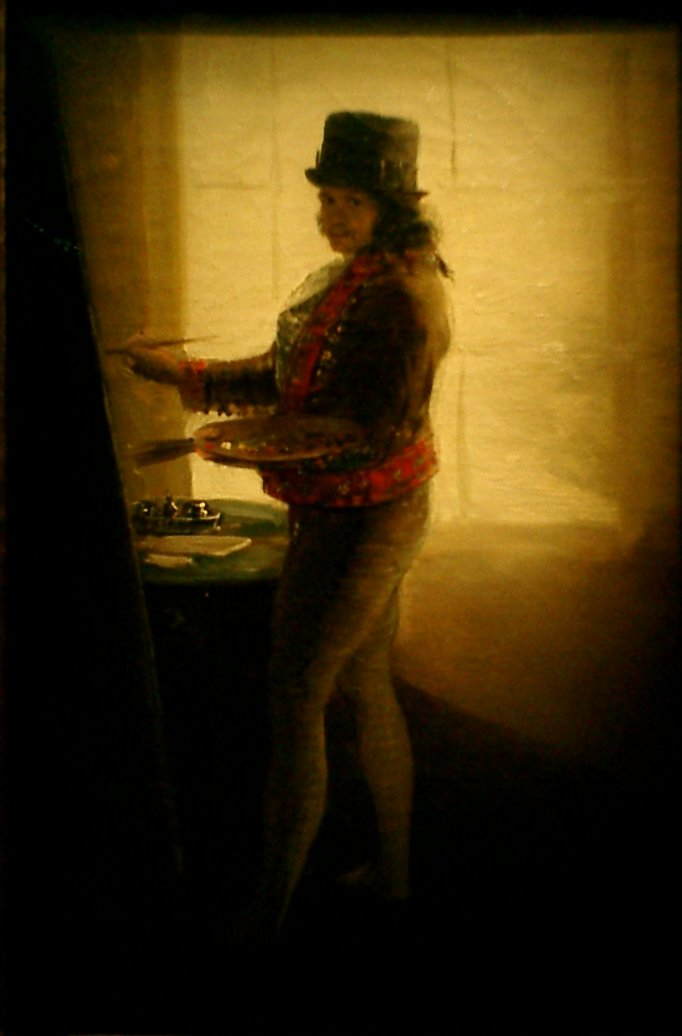
Goya, Self-portrait in the Studio, 1795

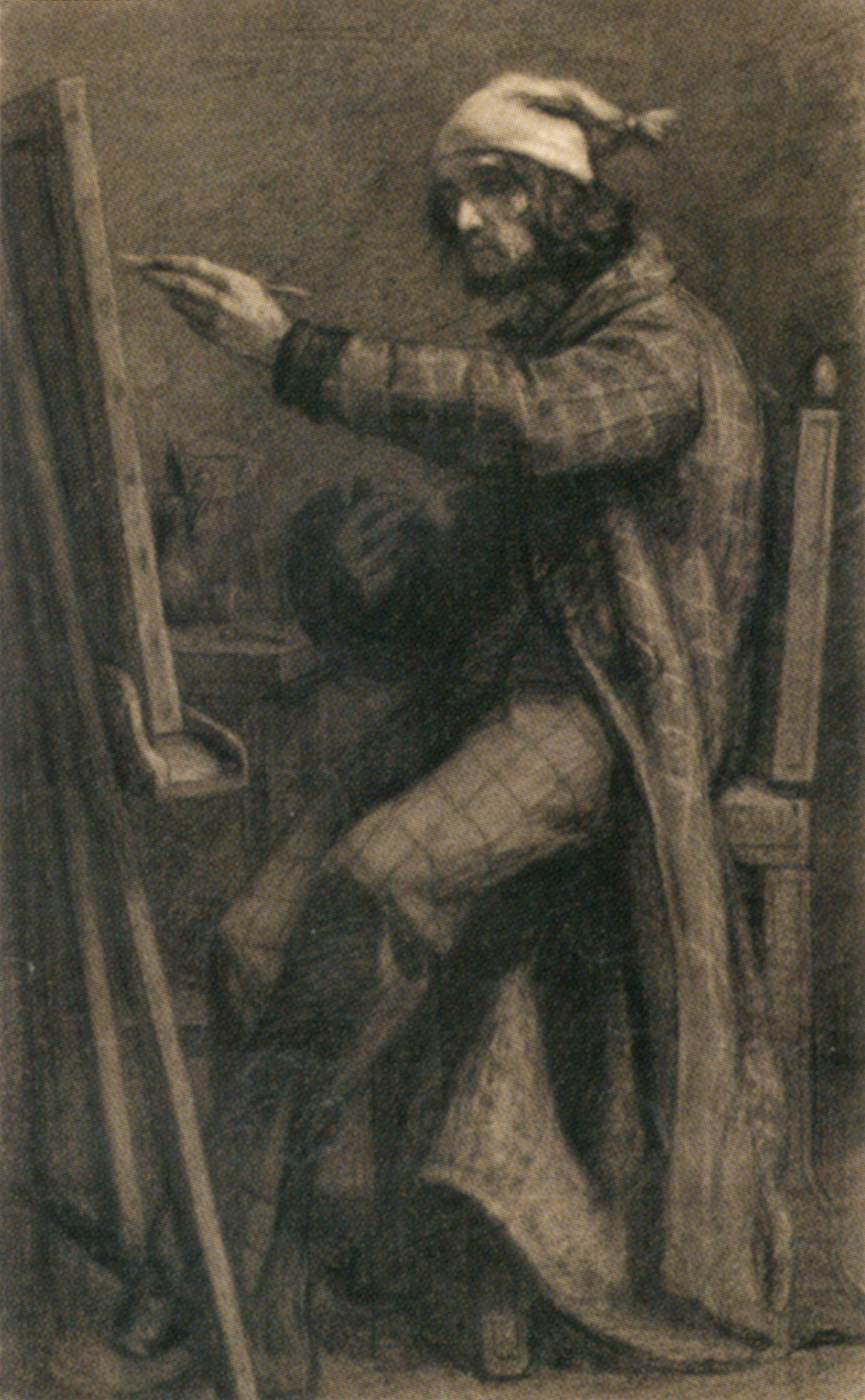
Gustave Courbet, Artist at His Easel, c. 1847–1848, charcoal on paper

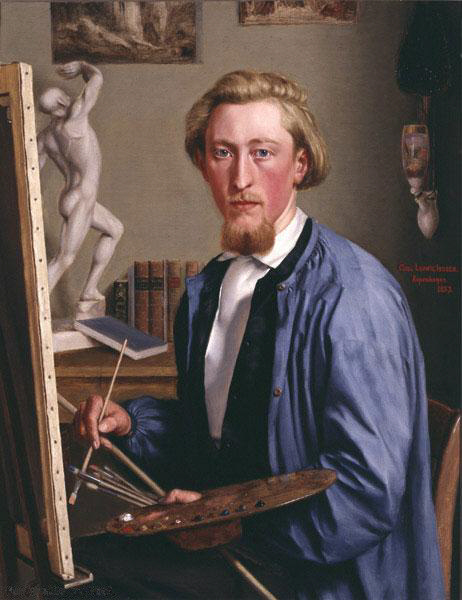
Carl Ludwig Jessen, Self-portrait, 1857

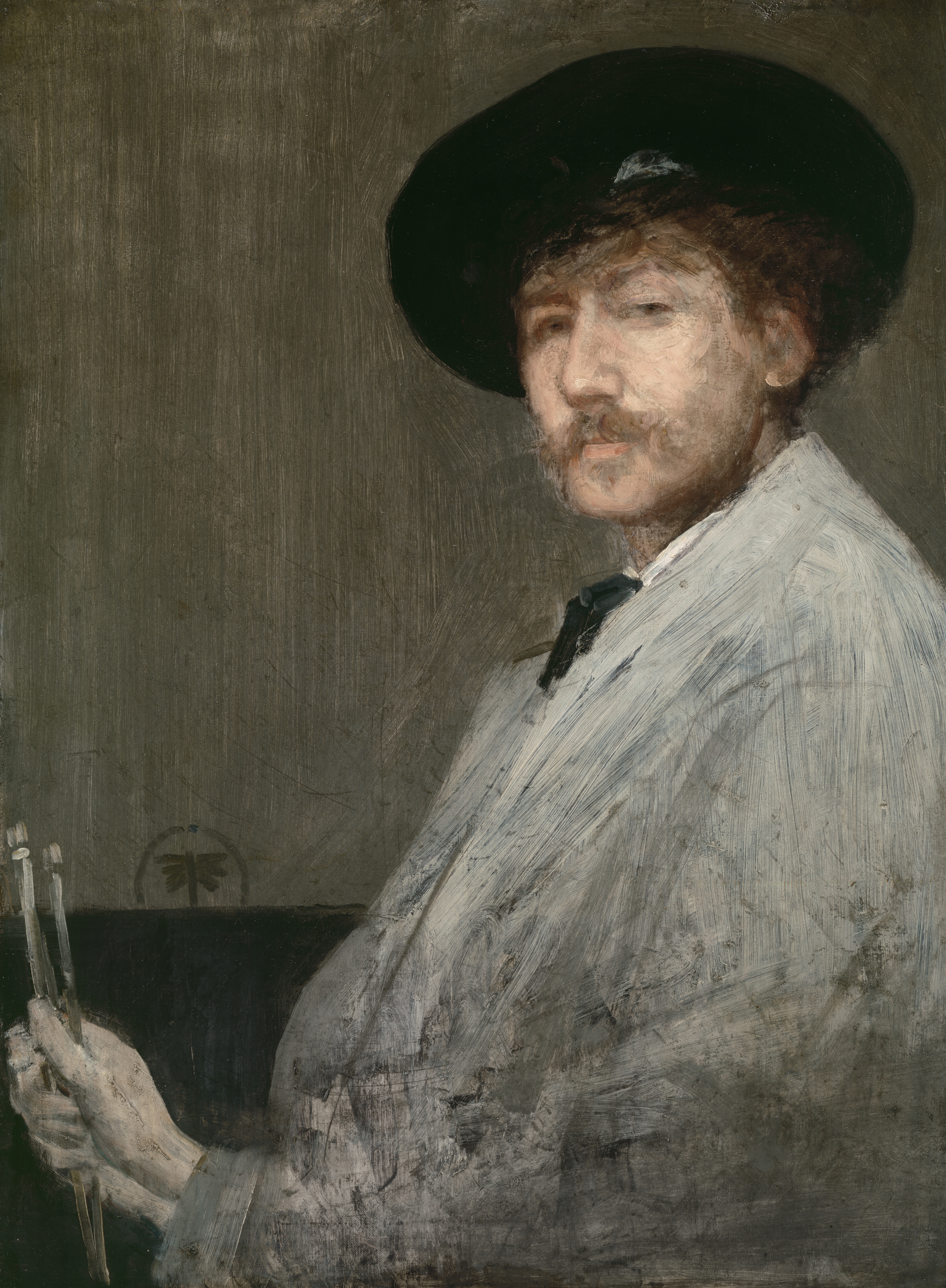
James Whistler, Self-portrait, c. 1872, Detroit Institute of Arts

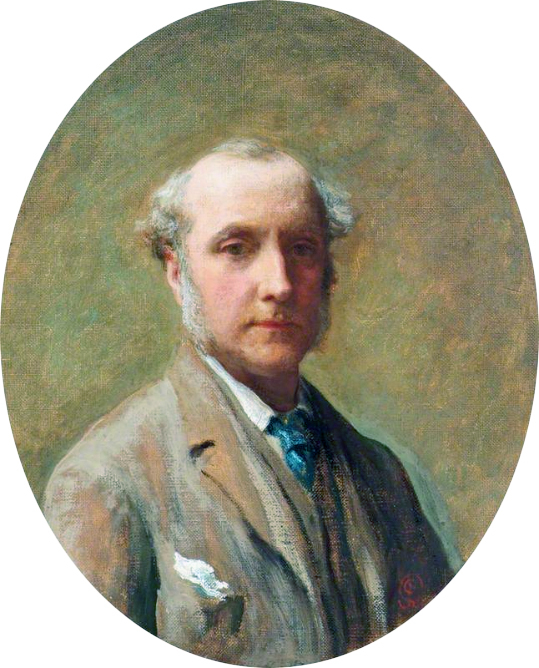
James Sant, Self-portrait, 1884, Aberdeen Art Gallery

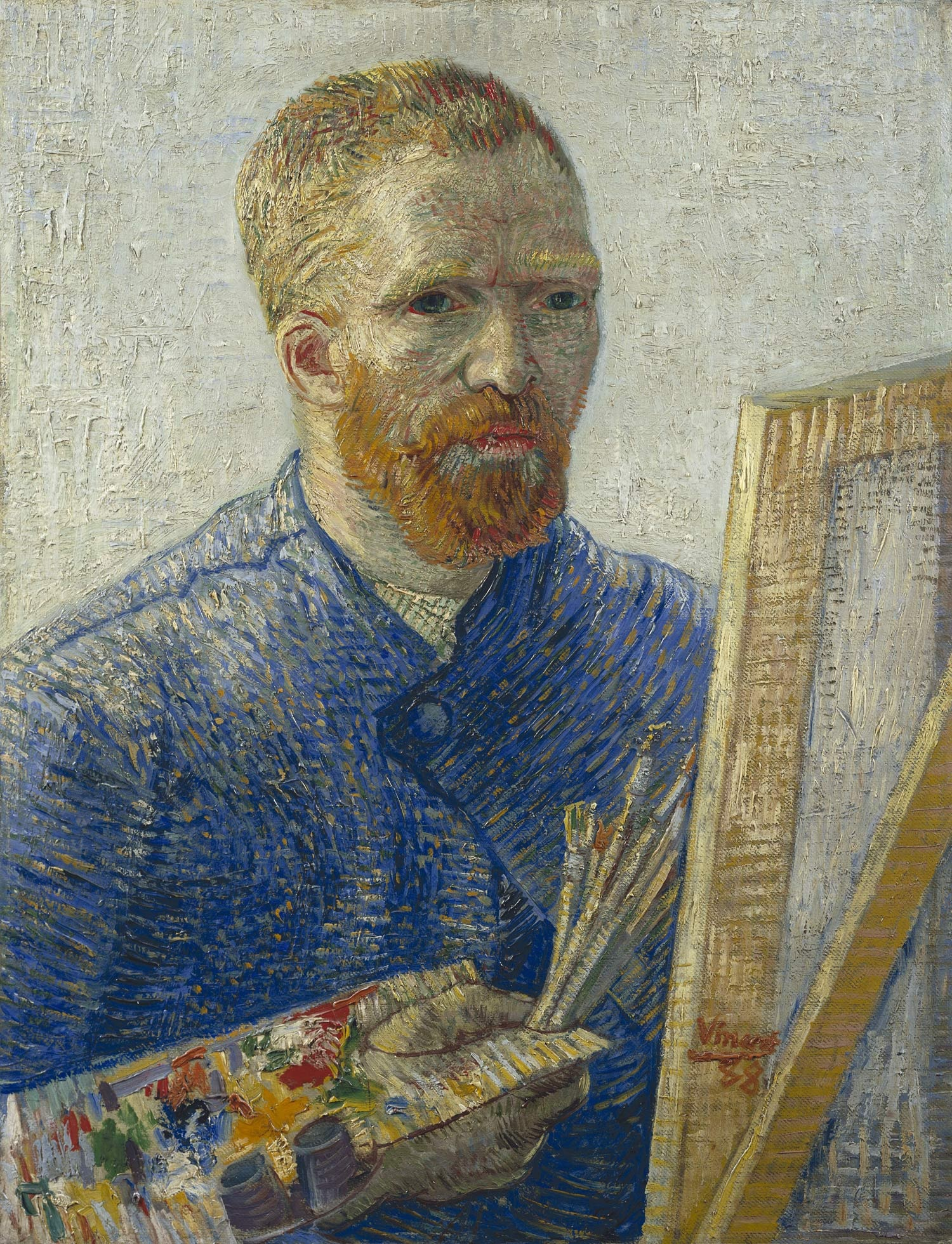
Vincent van Gogh, Self-portrait as a Painter, December 1887 - February 1888

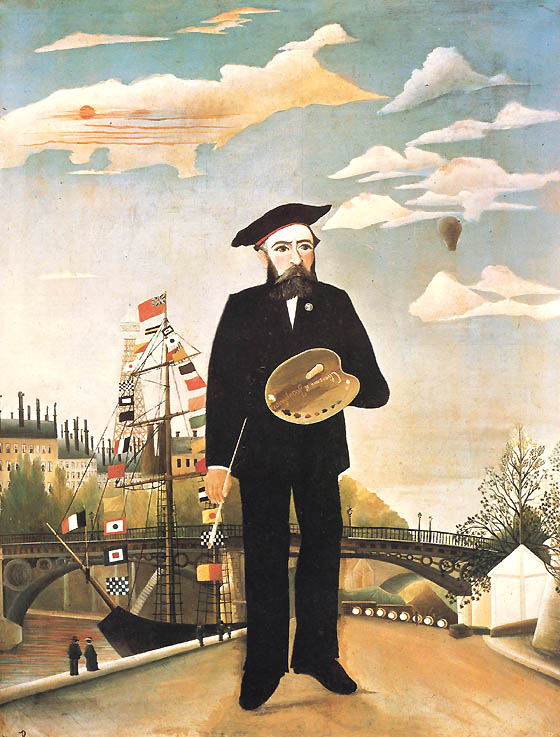
Henri Rousseau, 1890

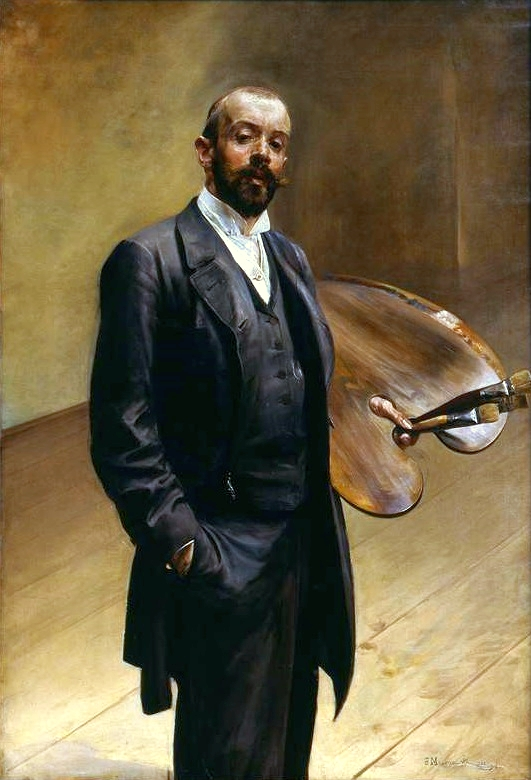
Jacek Malczewski, Self-portrait with a Palette, 1892

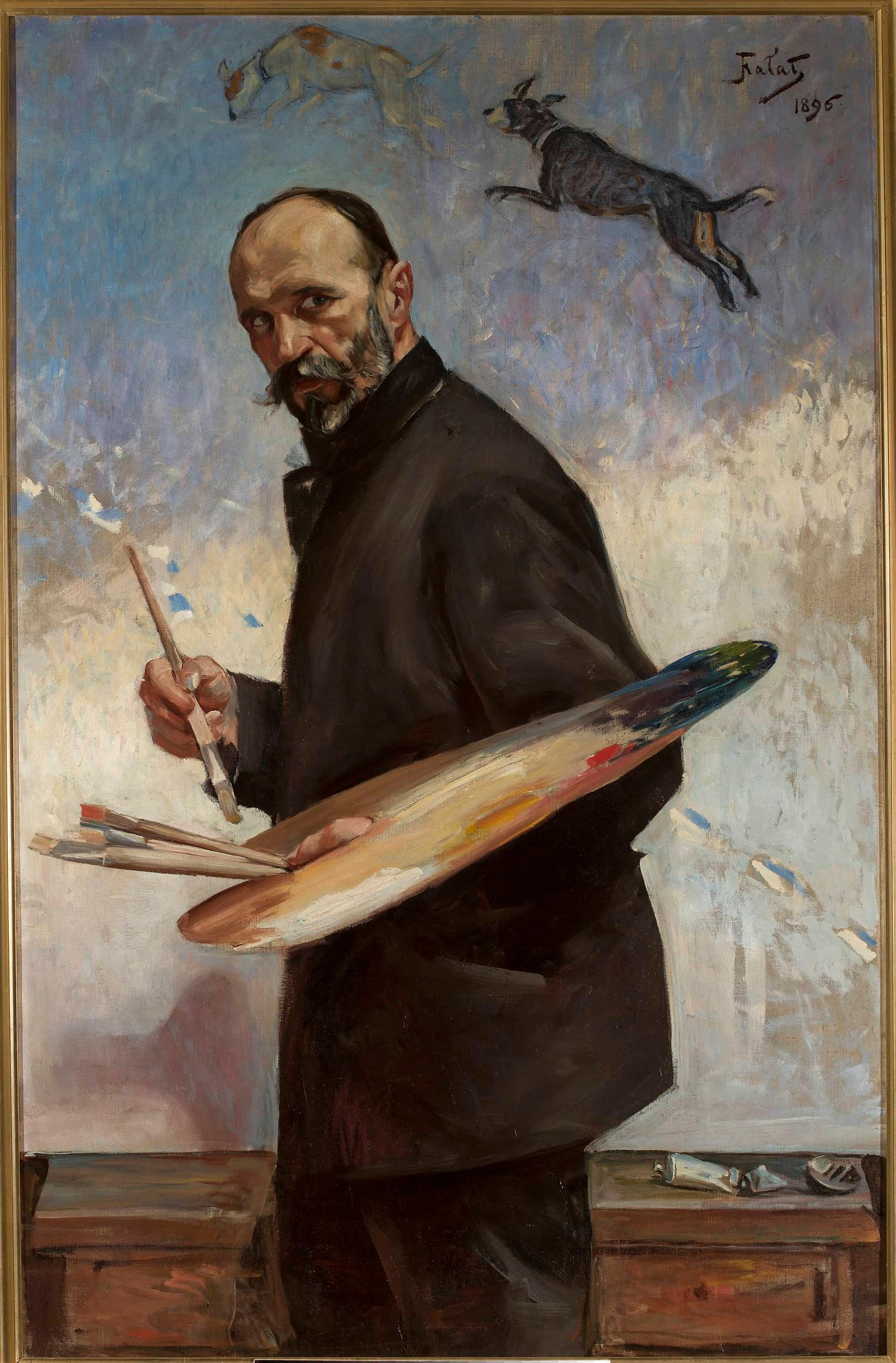
Julian Fałat, Self-portrait with a Palette, 1896

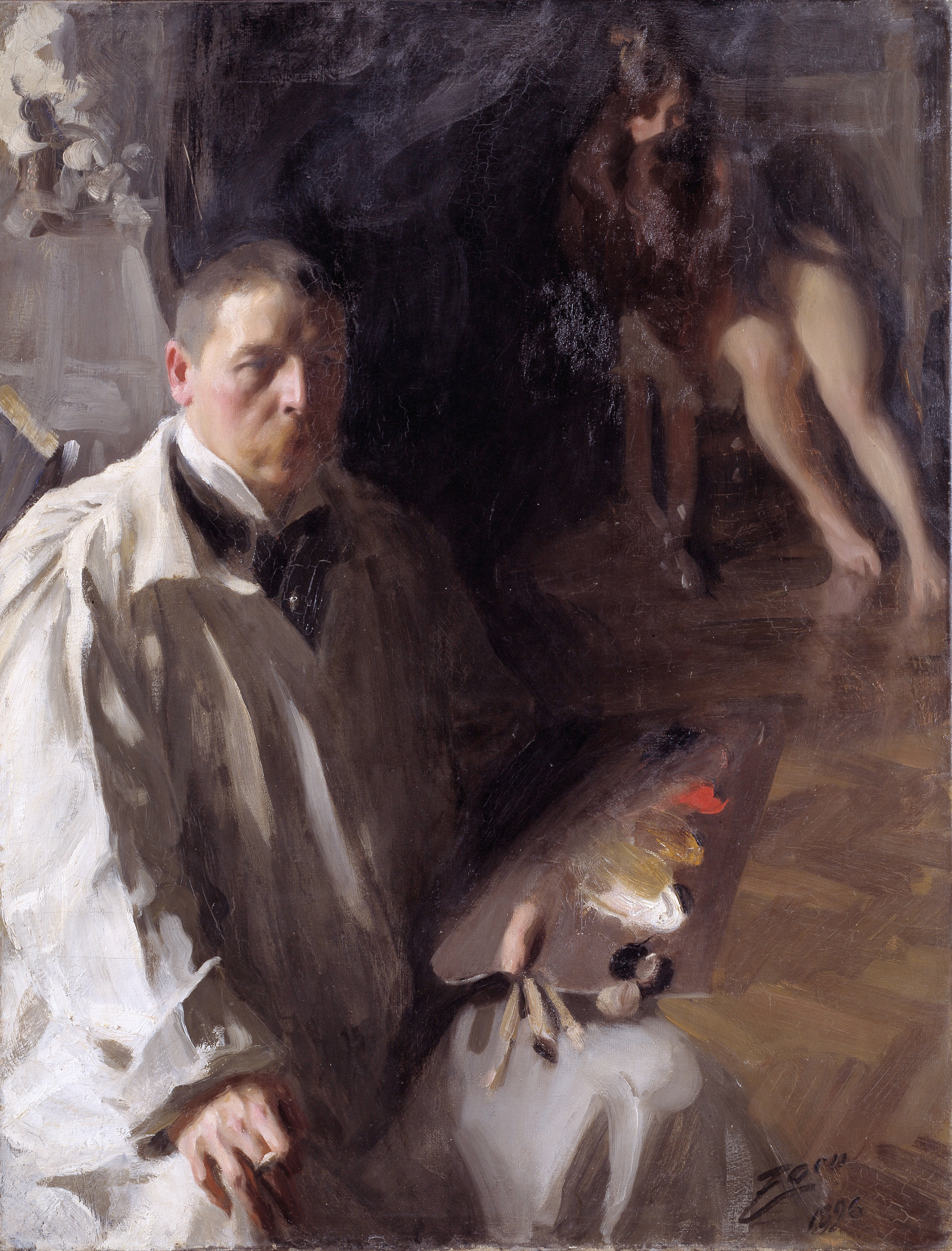
Anders Zorn, Self-portrait with a Model, 1896

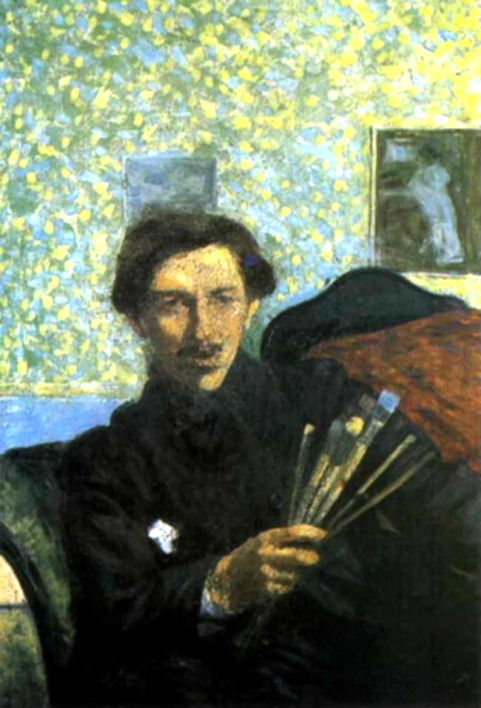
Umberto Boccioni, Self-portrait, 1906

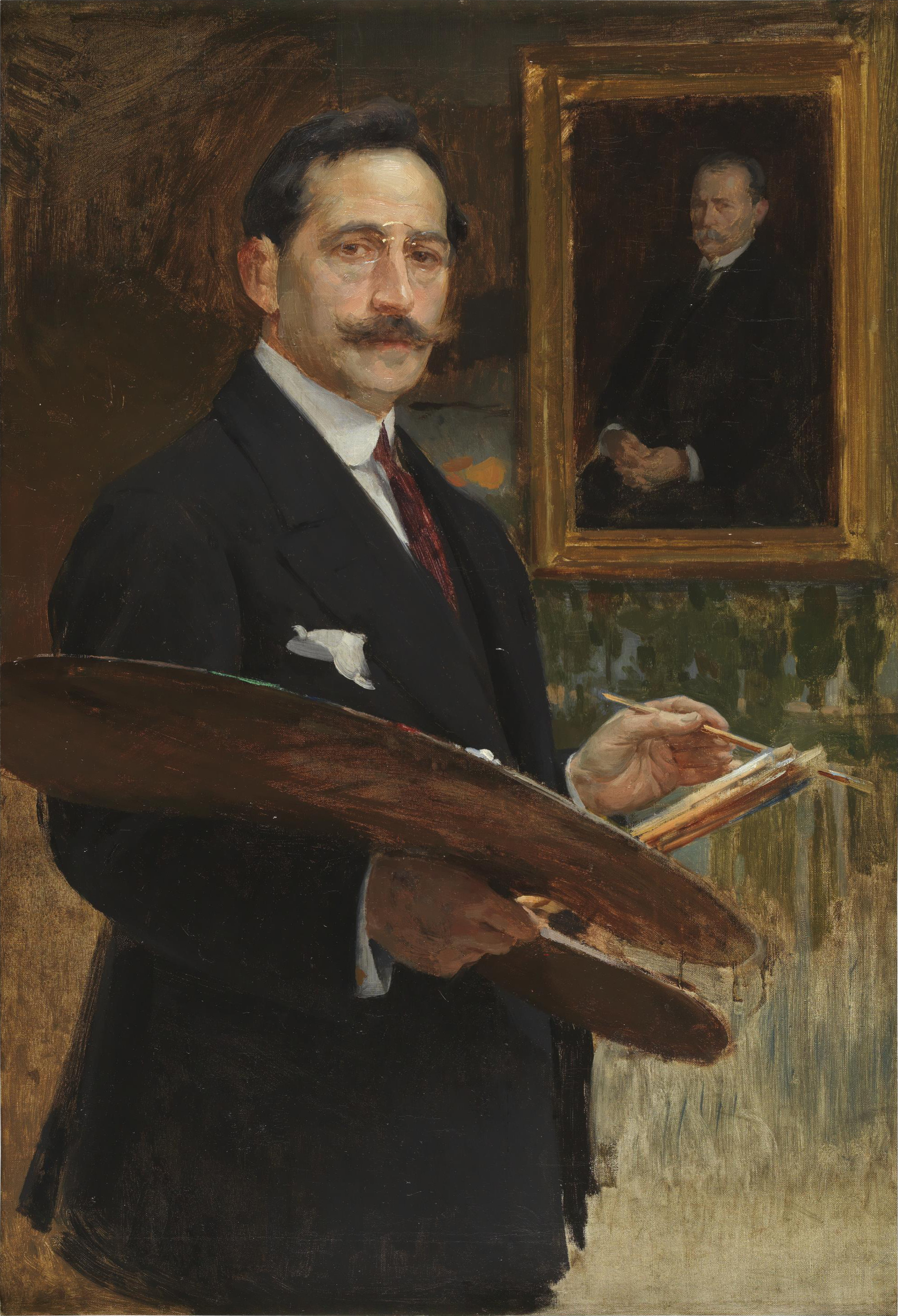
Enrique Simonet, Self-portrait with a Palette, 1910

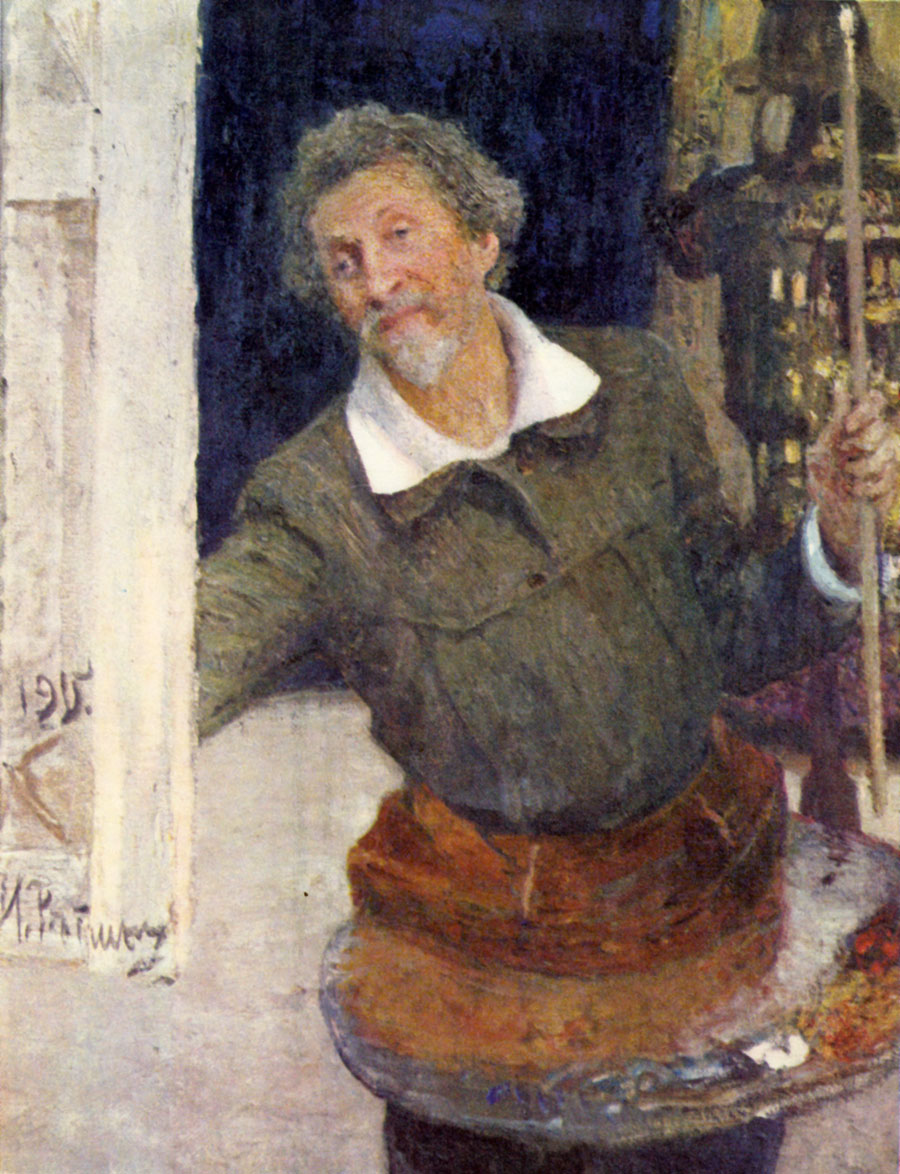
Ilya Repin, Self-portrait at Work, 1915

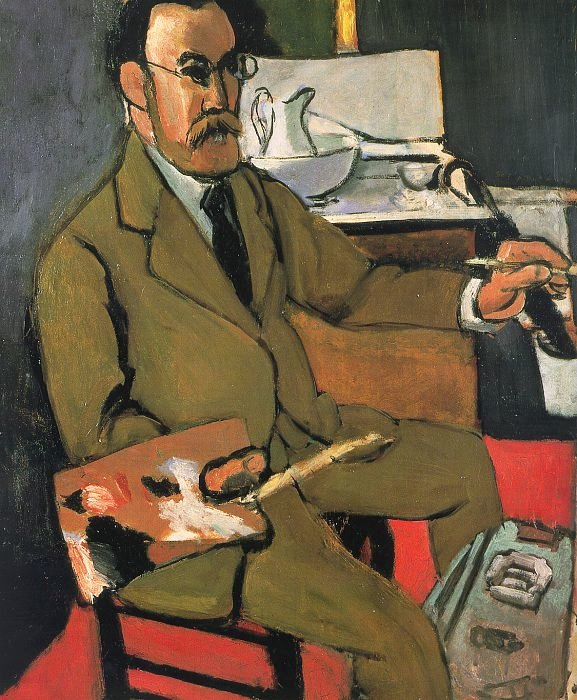
Henri Matisse, Self-portrait, 1918, Matisse Museum (Le Cateau)

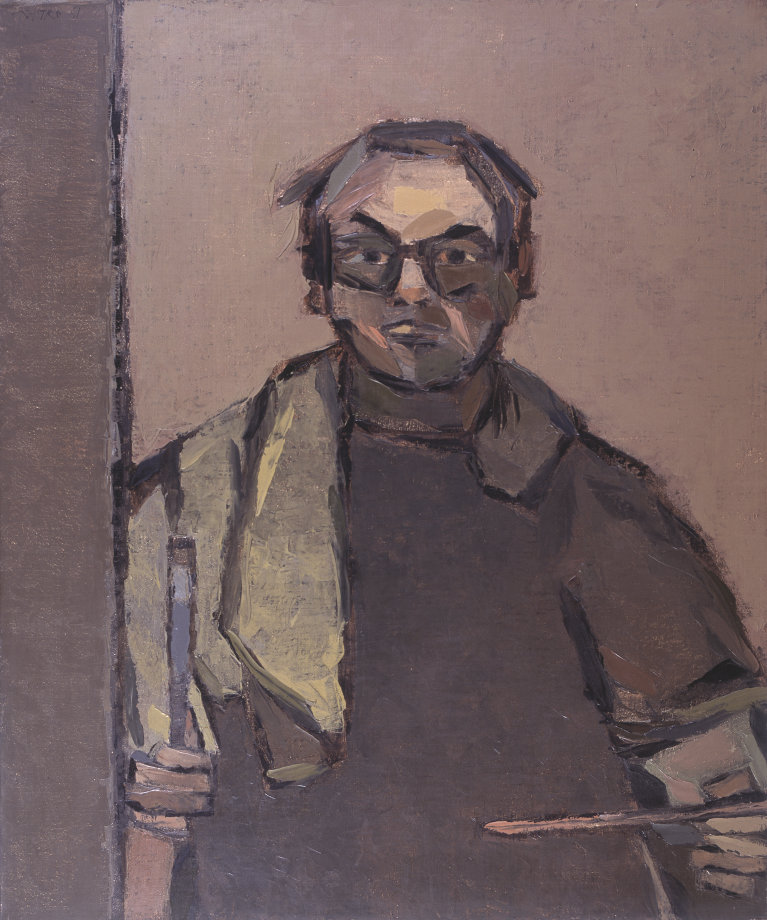
Sergio de Castro, Self-portrait with brushes, oil on canvas, 1961

=== Classification ===
Art critic Galina Vasilyeva-Shlyapina separates two basic forms of the self-portrait: "professional" portraits, in which the artist is depicted at work, and "personal" portraits, which reveal moral and psychological features. She also proposes a more detailed taxonomy: (1) the "insertable" self-portrait, where the artist inserts his or her own portrait into, for example, a group of characters related to some subject; (2) the "prestigious, or symbolic" self-portrait, where an artist depicts him- or herself in the guise of a historical person or religious hero; (3) the "group portrait" where artist is depicted with members of family or other real persons; (4) the "separate or natural" self-portrait, where the artist is depicted alone. However it might be thought these classes are rather rigid; many portraits manage to combine several of them.

With new media came a chance to create different kinds of self-portraits besides simply static painting or photographs. Many people, especially teens, use social networking sites to form their own personal identity on the internet. Still others use blogs or create personal web pages to create a space for self-expression and self-portraiture.

=== Mirrors and poses ===
Las Meninas, painted in 1656, shows Diego Velázquez working at the easel to the left.

The self-portrait supposes in theory the use of a mirror; glass mirrors became available in Europe in the 15th century. The first mirrors used were convex, introducing deformations that the artist sometimes preserved. A painting by Parmigianino in 1524 Self-portrait in a mirror, demonstrates the phenomenon. Mirrors permit surprising compositions like the Triple self-portrait by Johannes Gumpp (1646), or more recently that of Salvador Dalí shown from the back painting his wife, Gala (1972–73). This use of the mirror often results in right-handed painters representing themselves as left-handed (and vice versa). Usually the face painted is therefore a mirror image of what the rest of the world saw, unless two mirrors were used. Most of Rembrandt's self-portraits before 1660 show only one hand – the painting hand is left unpainted. He appears to have bought a larger mirror in about 1652, after which his self-portraits become larger. In 1658 a large mirror in a wood frame broke whilst being transported to his house; nonetheless, in this year he completed his Frick self-portrait, his largest.

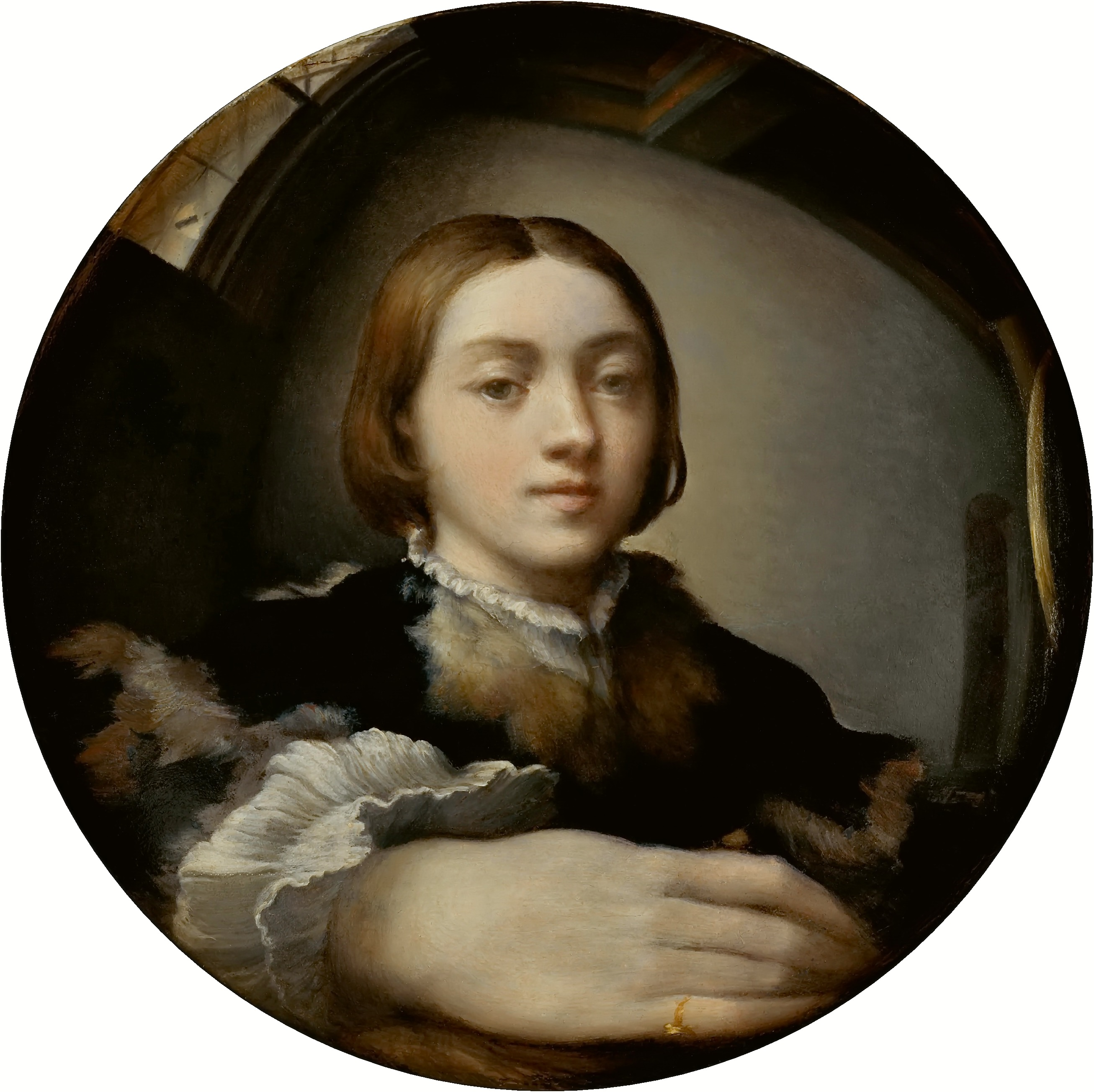
Parmigianino, Self-portrait in a mirror c. 1524, is itself painted on a convex surface, like that of the mirrors of the period

Gustave Courbet, The Artist's Studio (L'Atelier du peintre): A Real Allegory of a Seven Year Phase in my Artistic and Moral Life, 1855, Musée d'Orsay

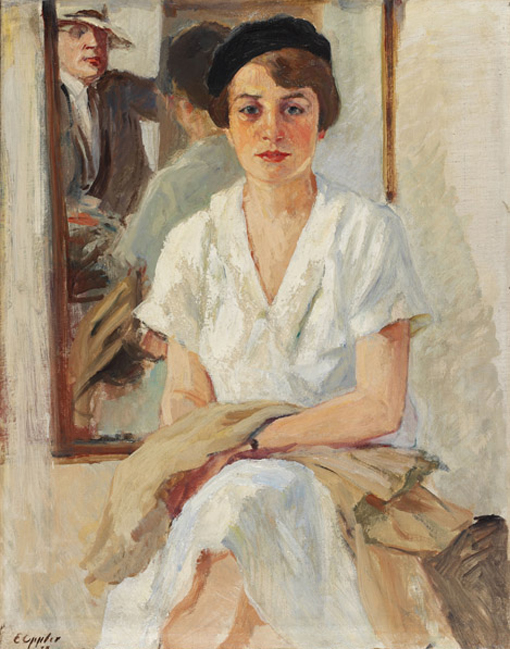
Ernst Oppler, The painter and Jo, 1928. Selfportrait and portrait

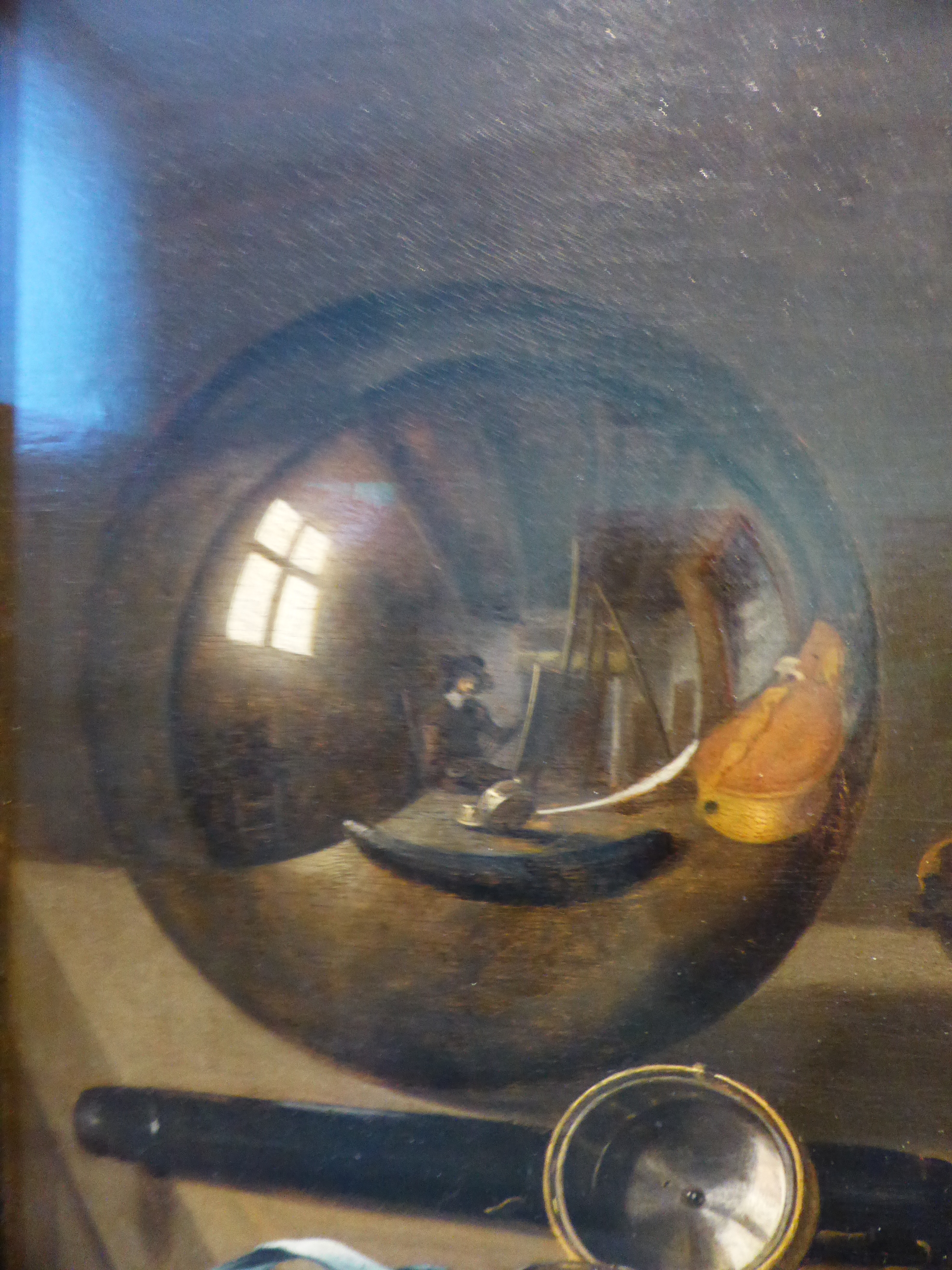
Pieter Claesz, Vanitas with Violin and Glass Ball (detail), the artist is visible in the reflection, 1625

The size of single-sheet mirrors was restricted until technical advances made in France in 1688 by Bernard Perrot. They also remained very fragile, and large ones were much more expensive pro-rata than small ones – the breakages were recut into small pieces. About 80 cm, or two and a half feet, seems to have been the maximum size until then – roughly the size of the palace mirror in Las Meninas (the convex mirror in the Arnolfini Portrait is considered by historians impractically large, one of Van Eyck's many cunning distortions of scale). Largely for this reason, most early self-portraits show painters at no more than half-length.

Self-portraits of the artist at work were, as mentioned above, the commonest form of medieval self-portrait, and these have continued to be popular, with a specially large number from the 18th century on. One particular type in the medieval and Renaissance periods was the artist shown as Saint Luke (patron saint of artists) painting the Virgin Mary. Many of these were presented to the local Guild of Saint Luke, to be placed in their chapel. A famous large view of the artist in his studio is The Artist's Studio by Gustave Courbet (1855), an immense "Allegory" of objects and characters amid which the painter sits.

=== Gallery: mortality in the self-portrait ===
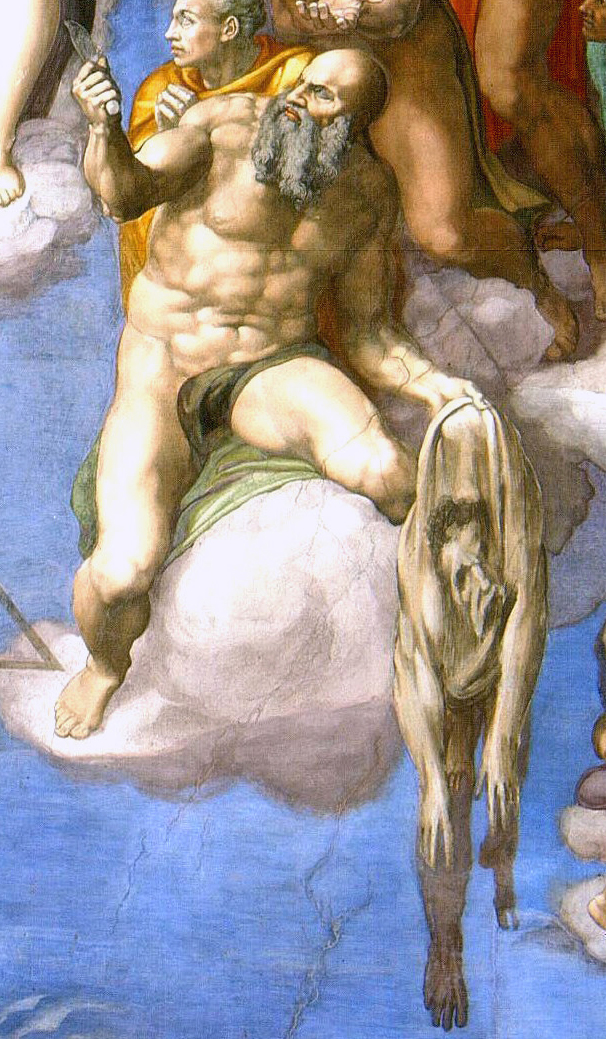
Michelangelo Buonarroti, c. 1535–1541, Sistine Chapel: The Last Judgment, Michelangelo as a limp skin hanging from the hand of St. Bartholomew.

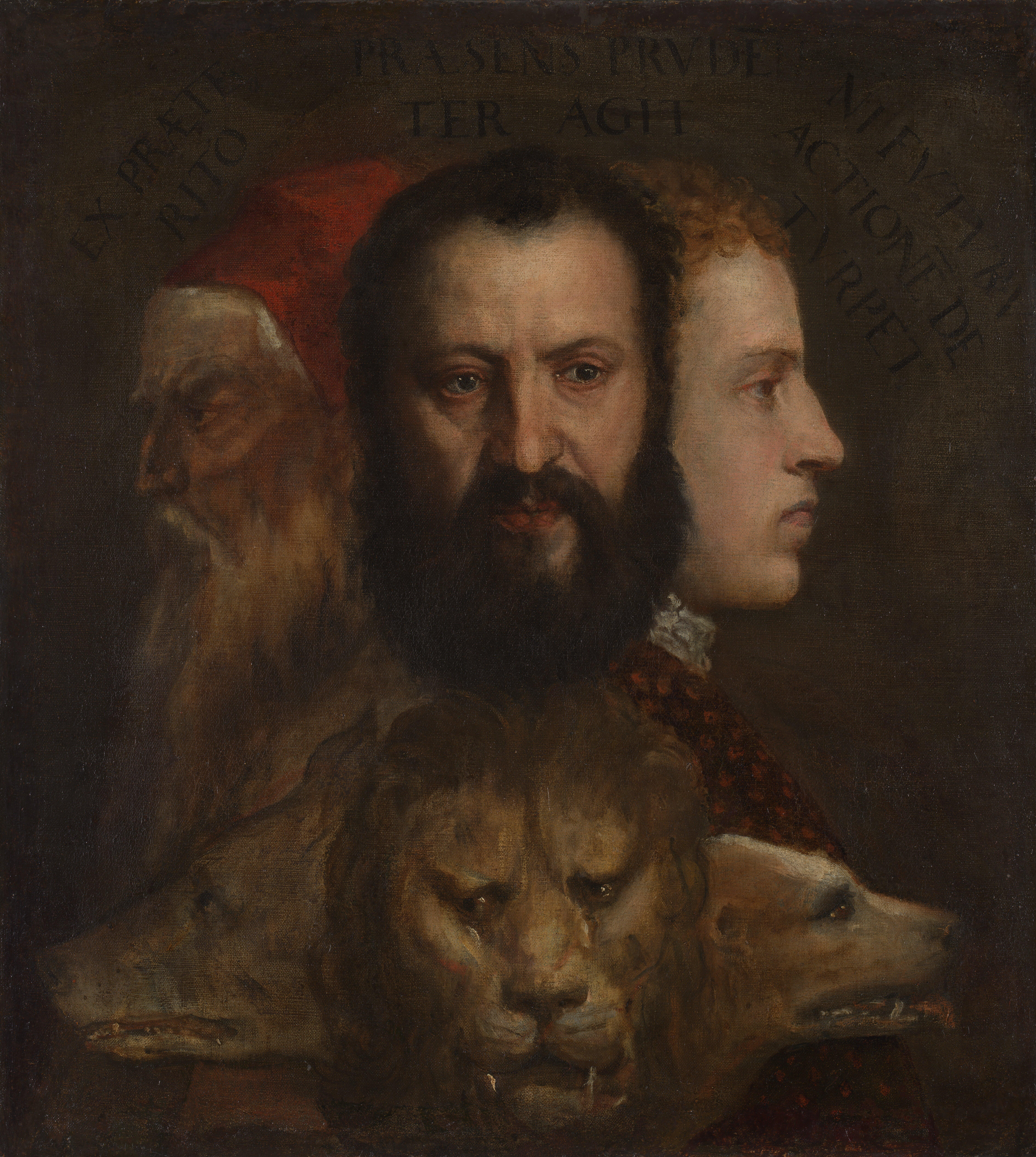
Allegory of Prudence, Titian, his son and the cousin he had virtually adopted, as Past, Present and Future. National Gallery, London, late 1560s.

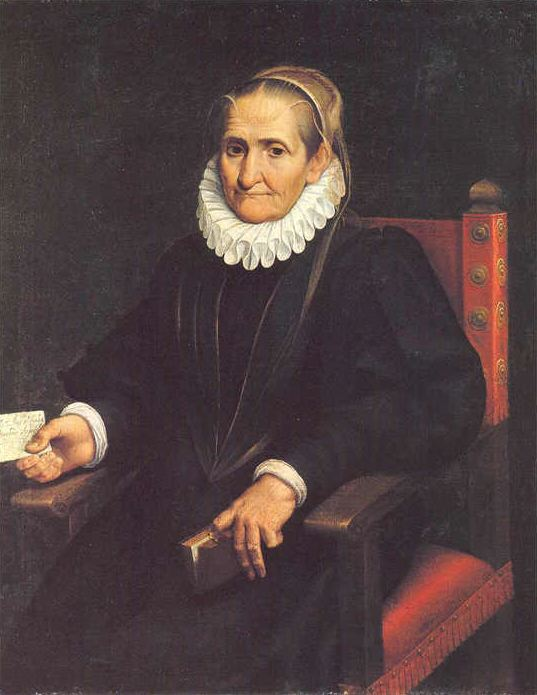
Sofonisba Anguissola, Self-portrait, 1610, aged 78, the last of her many self-portraits, though she was painted later by Van Dyck.

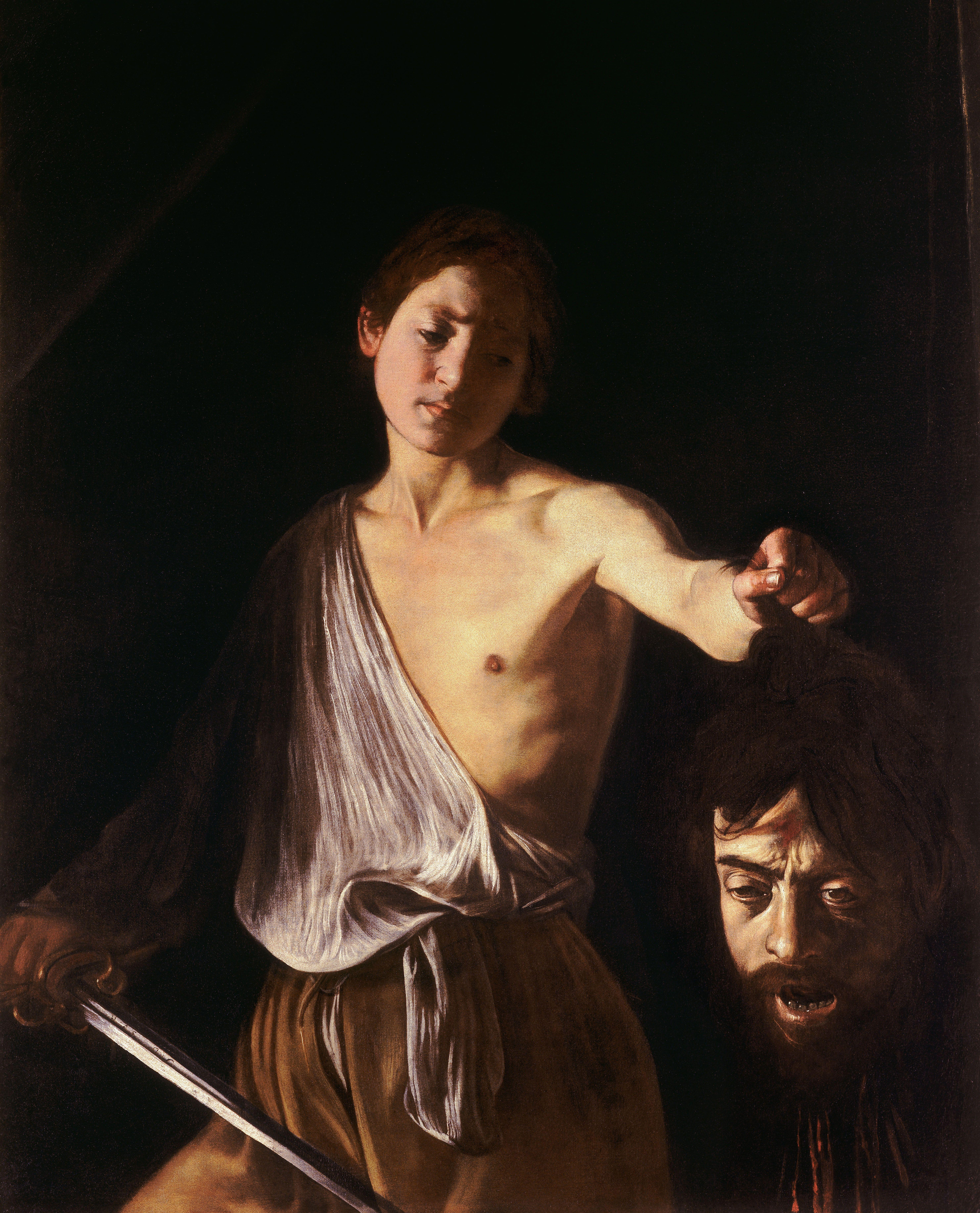
Goliath in this late Caravaggio David with the head of Goliath is a self-portrait. 1605–10, Galleria Borghese, Rome.

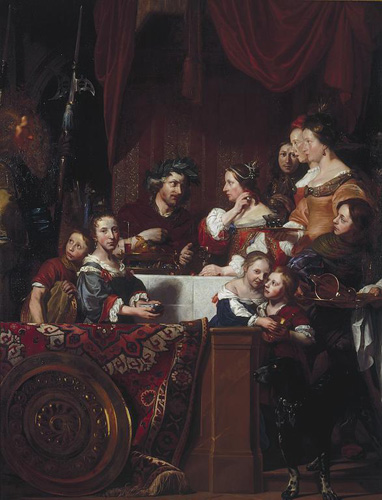
Jan de Bray (left) and his family pose as The Banquet of Anthony and Cleopatra. By the date of this second version of 1669, most of the models had died of the plague some years before.

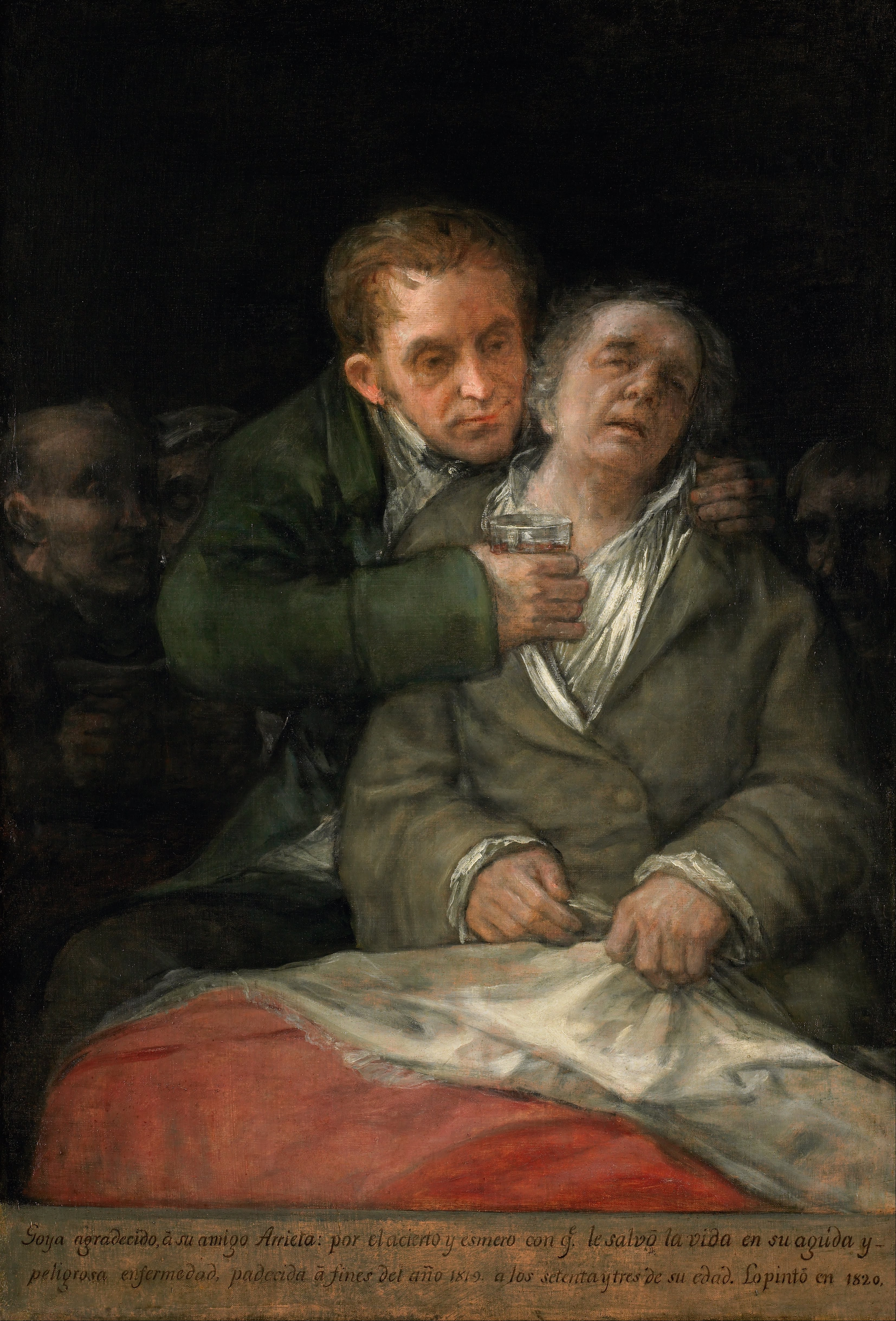
Goya at the age of 74, Self-portrait with Doctor Arrieta, 1820, Minneapolis.

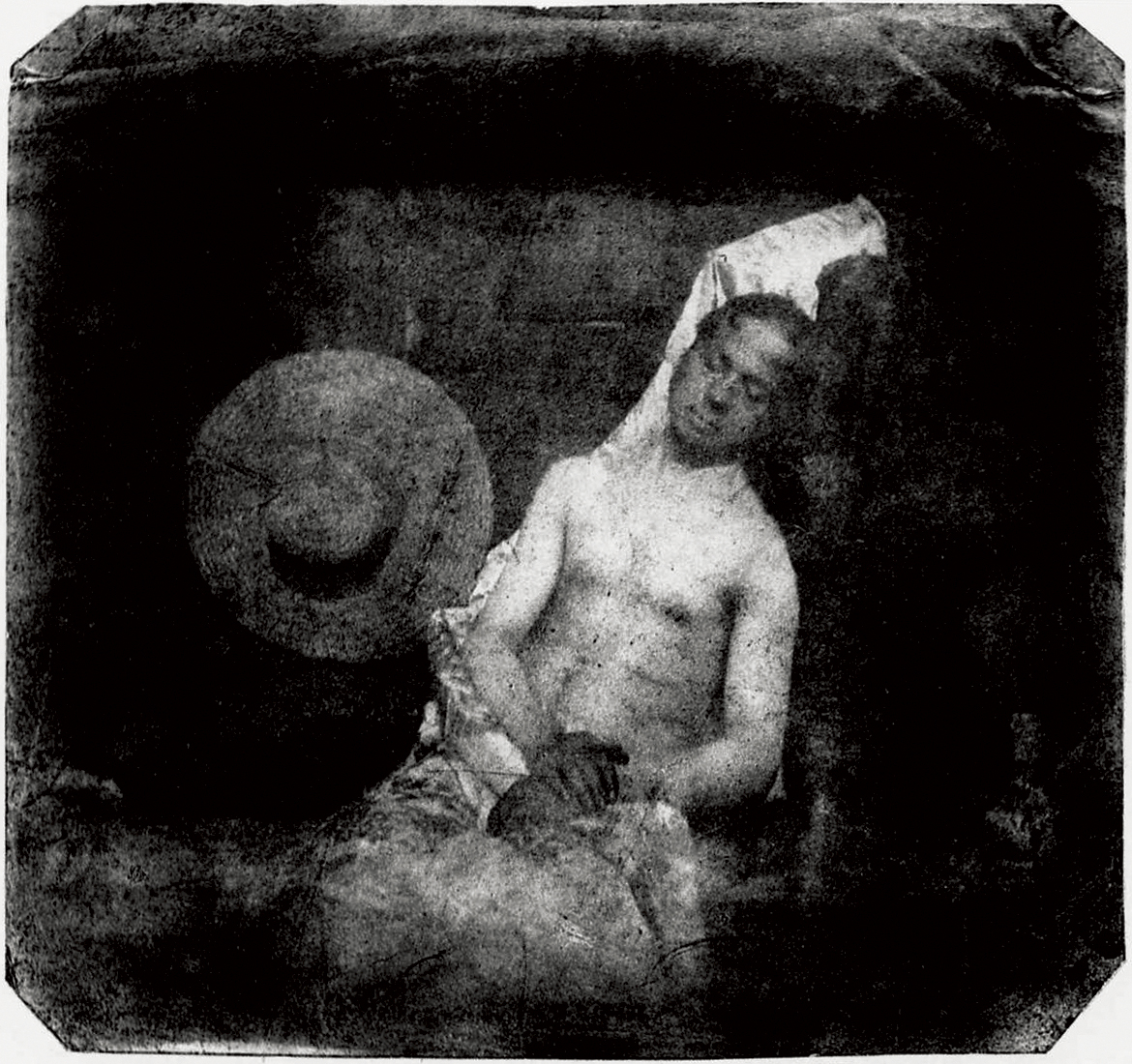
Hippolyte Bayard poses as a drowned man. He lies with his eyes closed, both for the technical reason of the long exposure required by his method and as a protest for the rejection of his claim as inventor of photography.

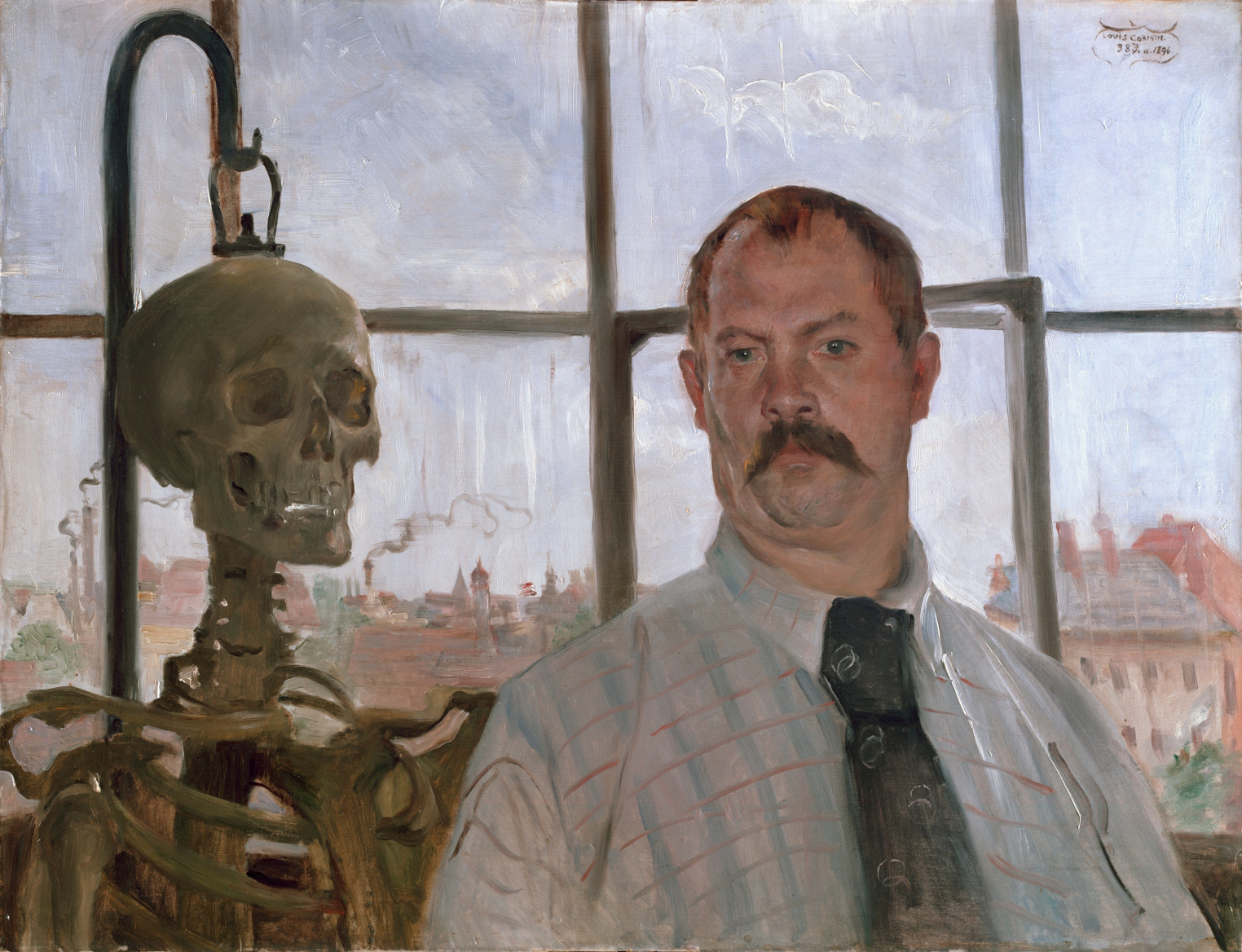
Lovis Corinth, 1896. Flesh and bone, life and death are contrasted here.

=== Other meanings, storytelling ===
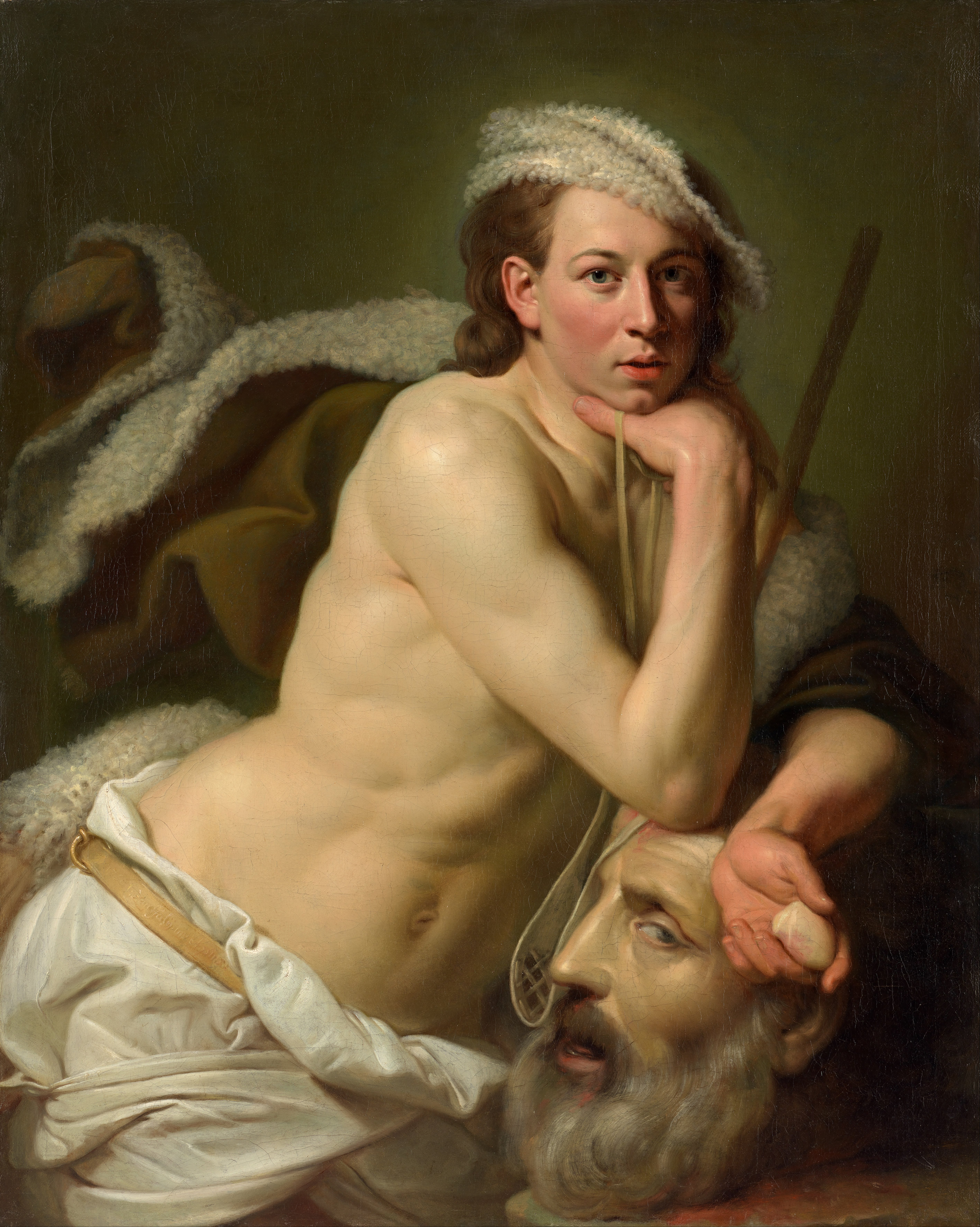
Self-portrait as David with the head of Goliath, Johan Zoffany

The self-portraits of many Contemporary artists and Modernists often are characterized by a strong sense of narrative, often but not strictly limited to vignettes from the artists life-story. Sometimes the narrative resembles fantasy, roleplaying and fiction. Besides Diego Velázquez, (in his painting Las Meninas), Rembrandt Van Rijn, Jan de Bray, Gustave Courbet, Vincent van Gogh, and Paul Gauguin other artists whose self-portraits reveal complex narratives include Pierre Bonnard, Marc Chagall, Lucian Freud, Arshile Gorky, Alice Neel, Pablo Picasso, Lucas Samaras, Jenny Saville, Cindy Sherman, Andy Warhol and Gilbert and George.

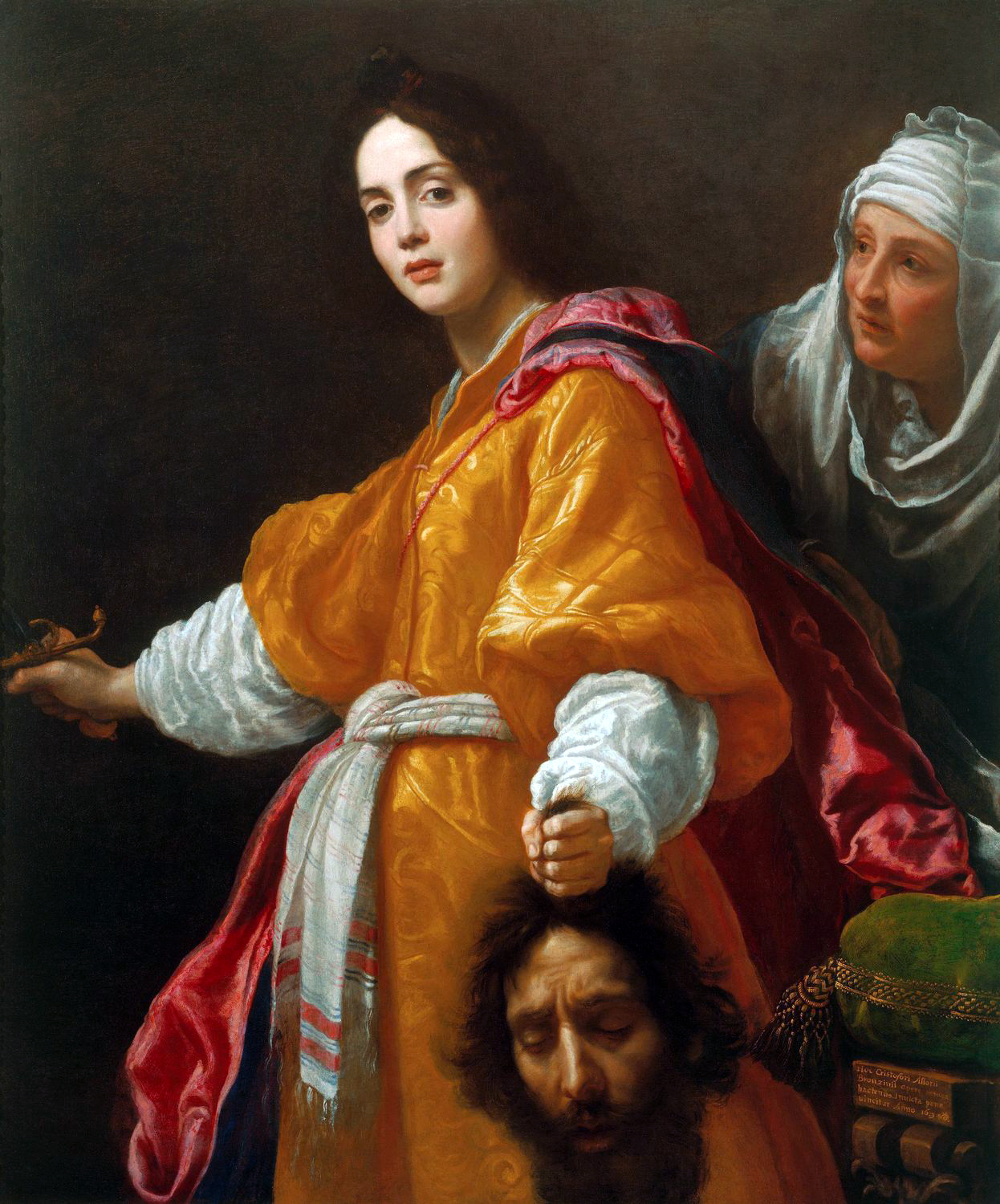
Cristofano Allori, Judith with the Head of Holofernes, 1613. According to his biographer, the heads were those of the painter, his ex-lover, and her mother. Compare Caravaggio above.

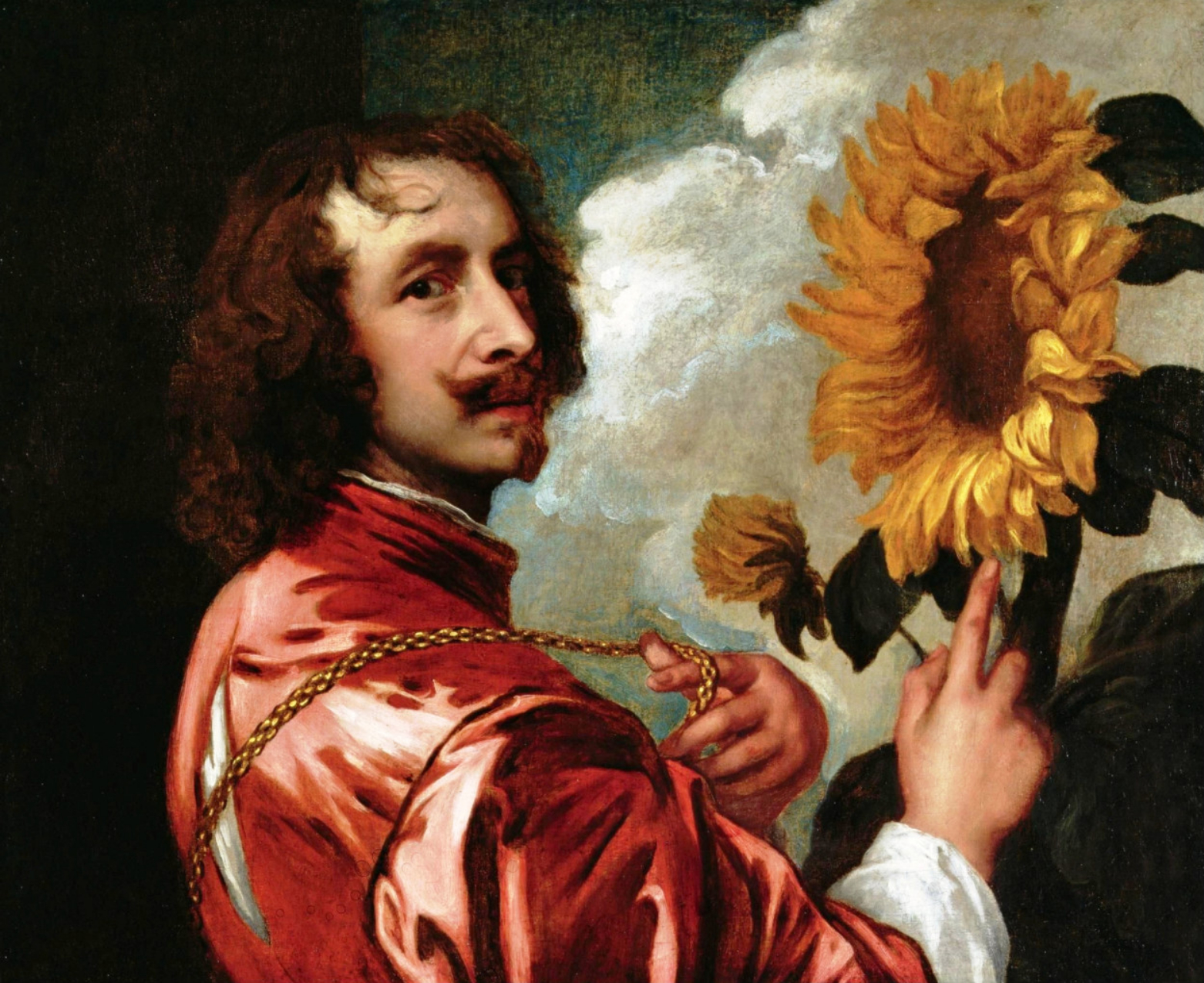
Van Dyck. Self-Portrait with a Sunflower, representing his patronage by Charles I, whose medal he holds up to the flower; what the flower symbolizes is debated. 1633 or later.

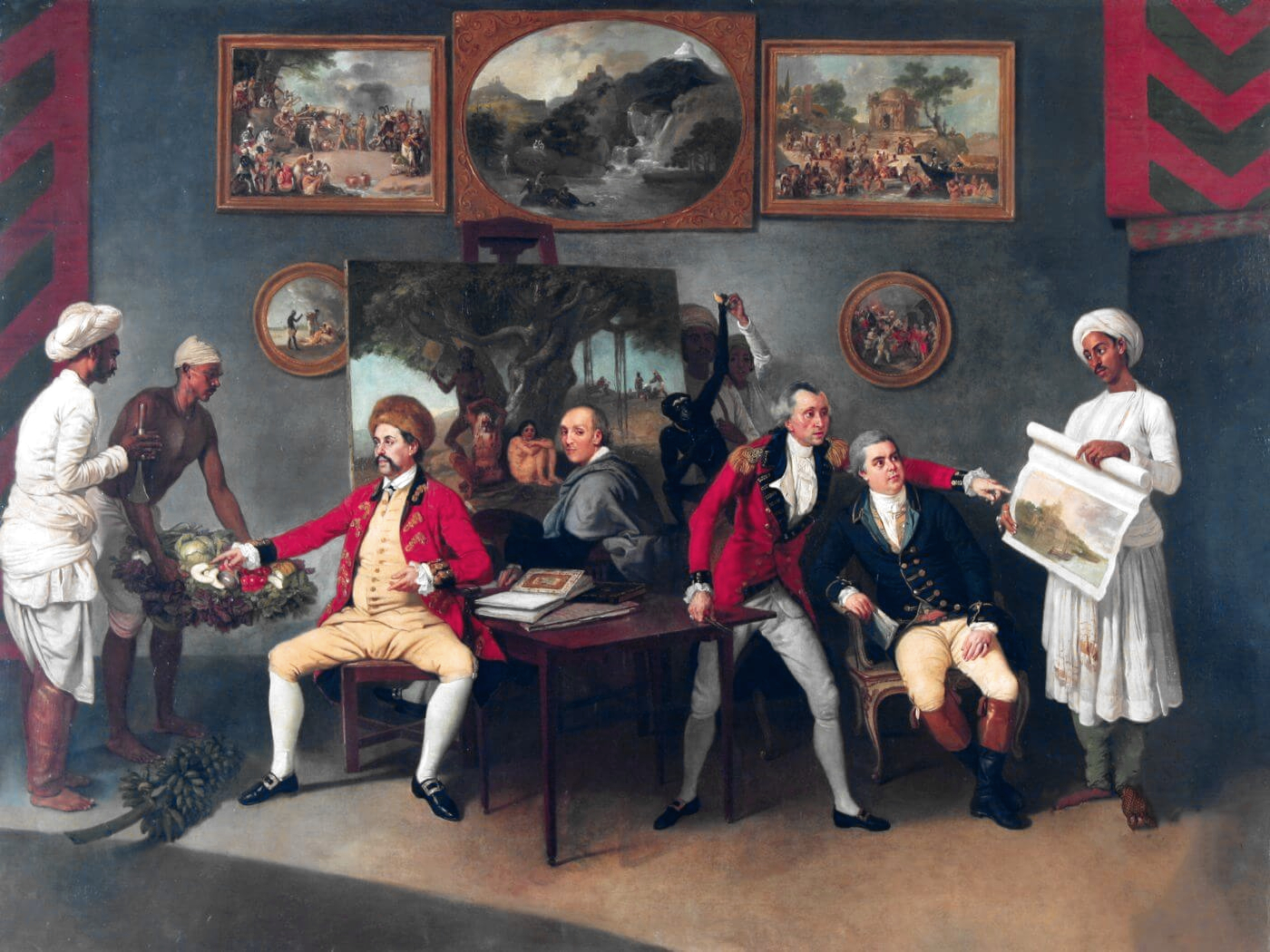
Johann Zoffany specialised in group portraits, often "conversation pieces" with gentle narrative content, and spent some years in India. c. 1786.

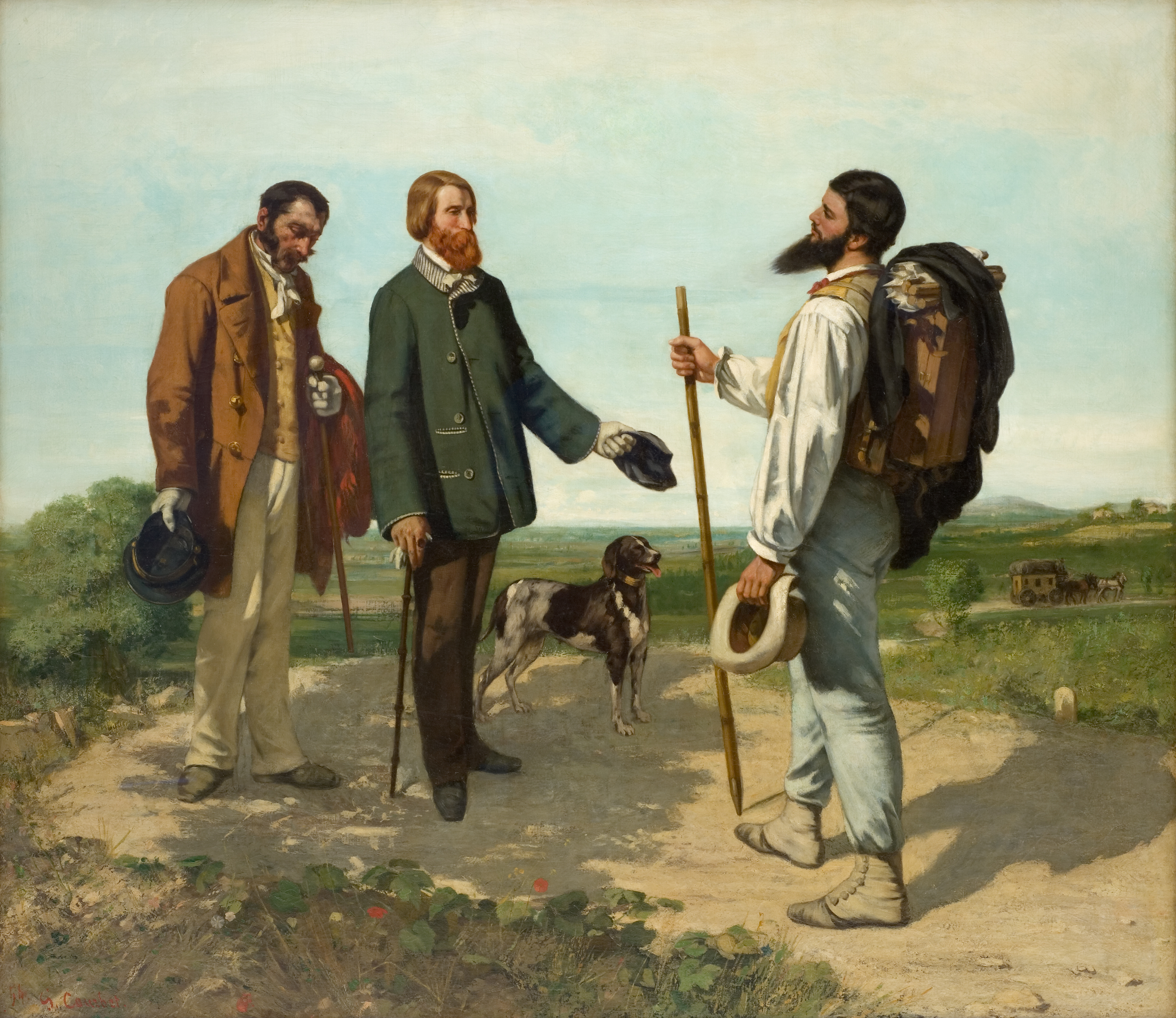
Gustave Courbet, 1854, Bonjour, Monsieur Courbet. The artist has travelled to the South of France (in the vanishing coach), to meet the collector Alfred Bruyas, for whom this was painted.

=== Self-promotion ===
The self-portrait can be a very effective form of advertising for an artist, especially of course for a portrait painter. Dürer was not really interested in portraits commercially, but made good use of his extraordinary self-portraits to advertise himself as an artist, something he was very sophisticated in doing. Sofonisba Anguissola painted intricate miniatures which served as advertisements for her skill as well as novelty items, considered such because the rarity of successful women painters provided them with an oddity quality. Rembrandt made his living principally from portrait-painting during his most successful period, and like Van Dyck and Joshua Reynolds, many of his portraits were certainly intended to advertise his skills. With the advent of regular Academy shows, many artists tried to produce memorable self-portraits to make an impression on the artistic stage. A recent exhibition at the National Gallery, London, Rebels and Martyrs, did not shrink from the comic bathos that sometimes resulted. An example from the 21st century is Arnaud Prinstet, an otherwise little-known contemporary artist who has generated good amounts of publicity by undertaking to paint his self-portrait every day. On the other hand, some artists depicted themselves very much as they did other clients.

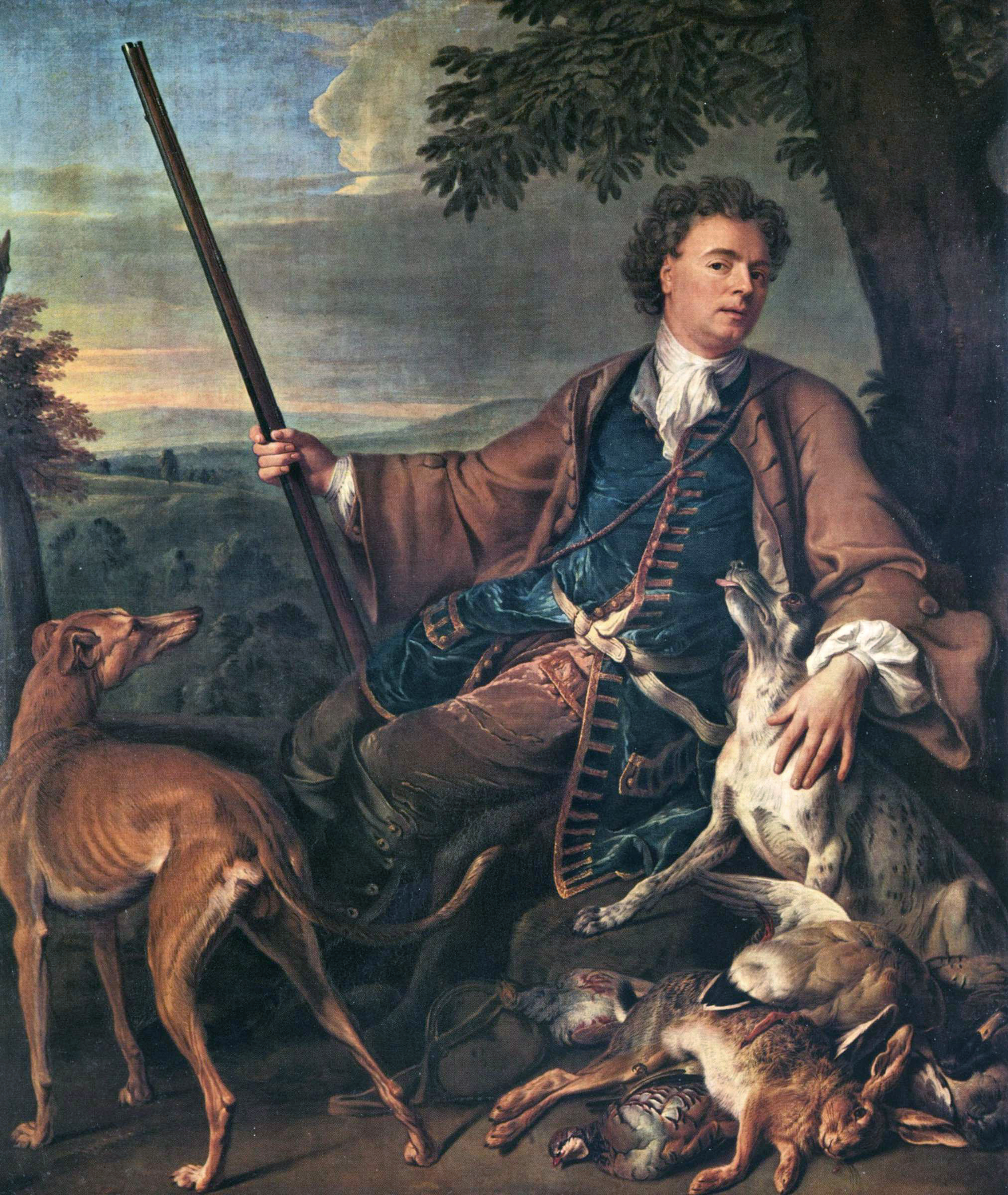
François Desportes, a specialist animal painter, Self-portrait as Hunter, 1699.

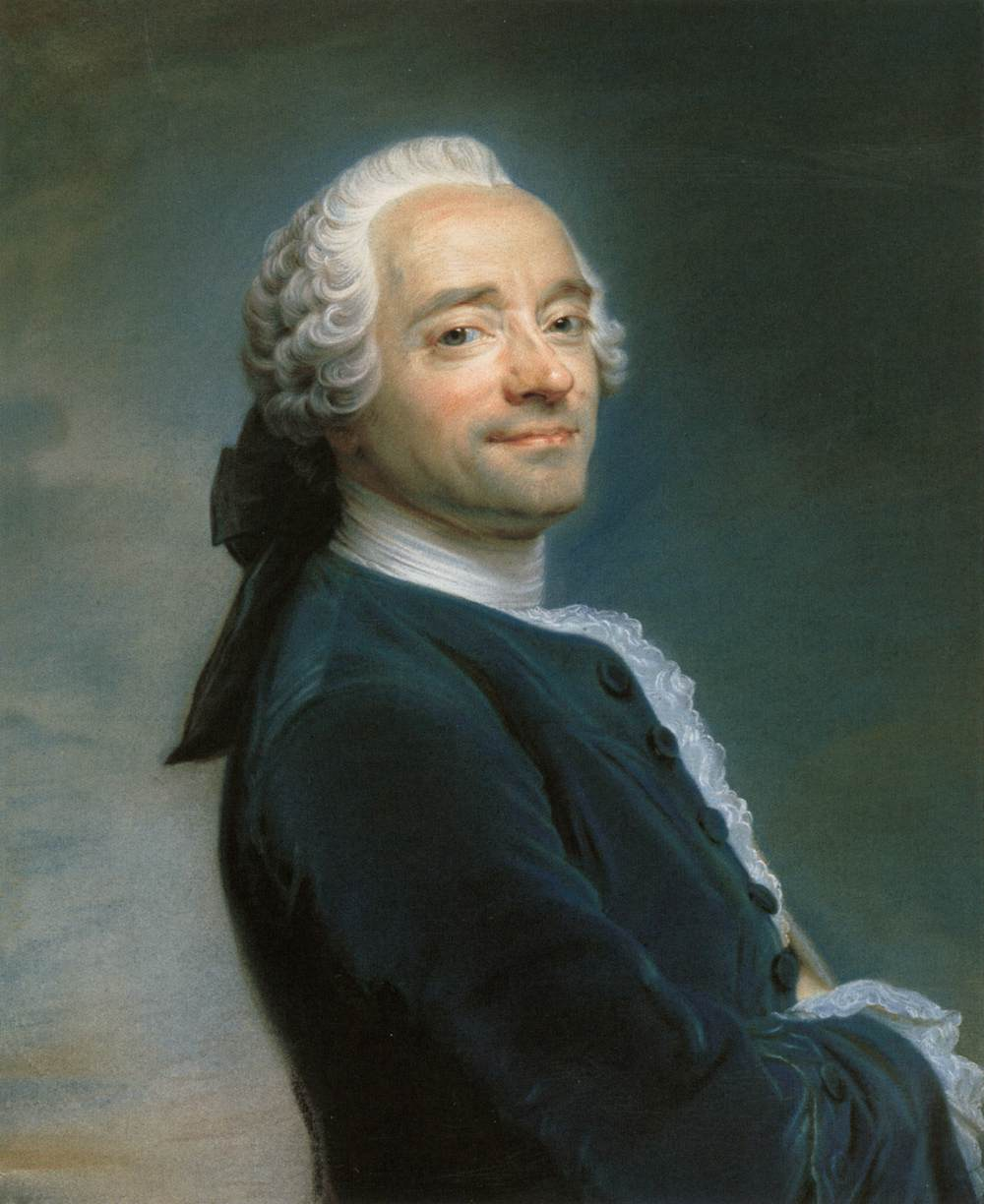
Maurice Quentin de La Tour, pastel, 1750–60.

Gustave Courbet, Self Portrait (The Desperate Man), c. 1843.

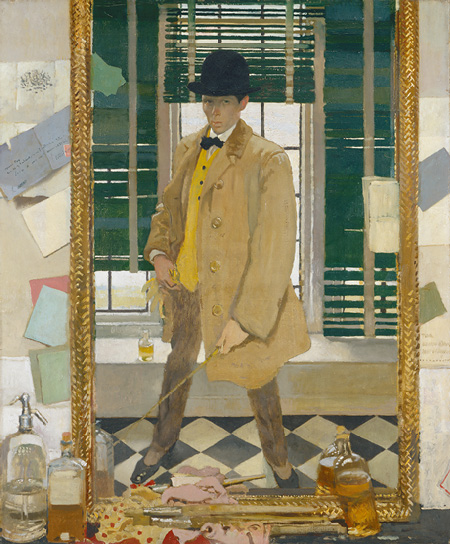
William Orpen, c. 1910

== Diagnosing the self-portrait ==
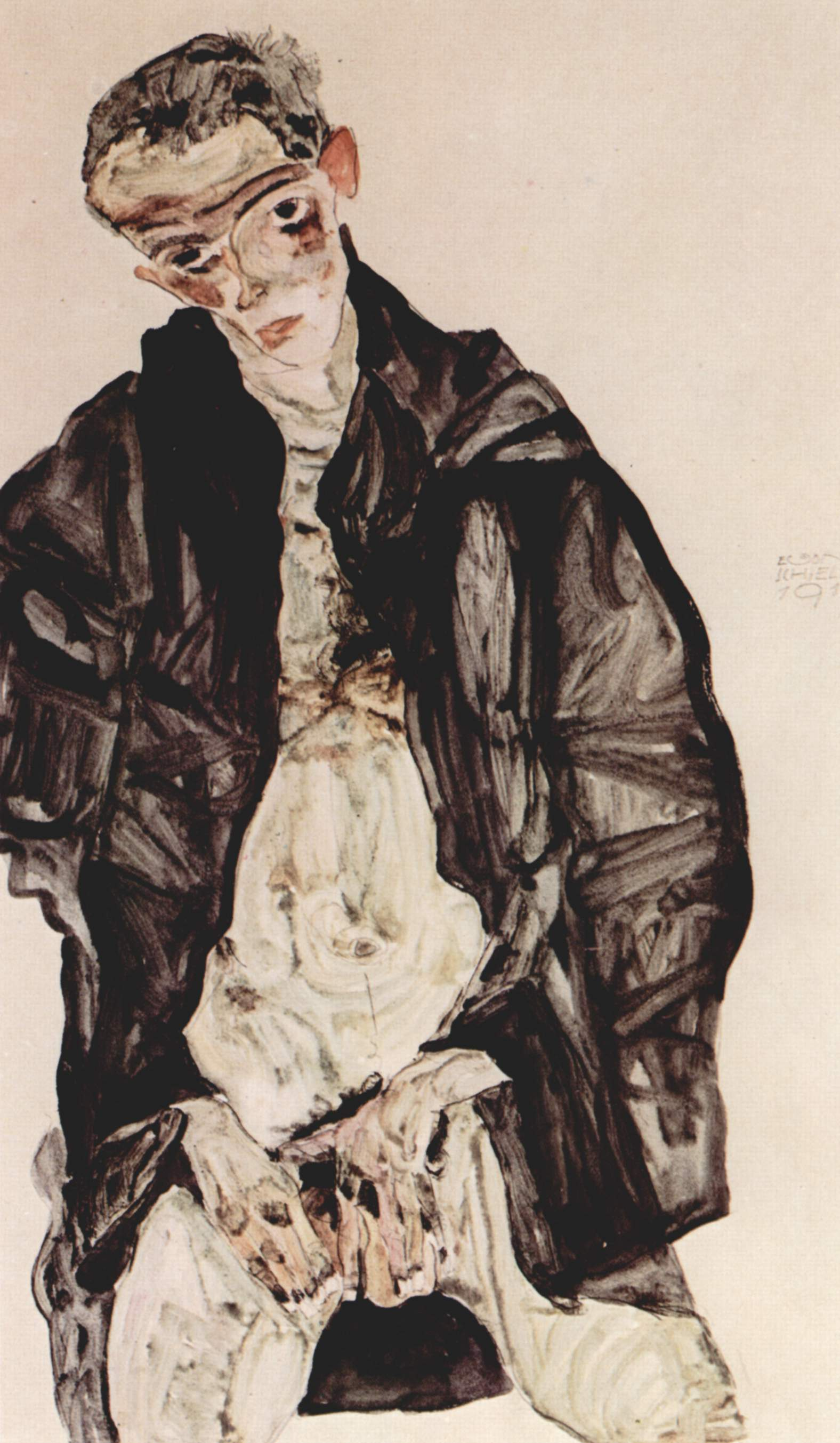
Self-portrait of Egon Schiele 1911, depicting masturbation.

Some artists who suffered neurological or physical diseases have left self-portraits of themselves that have allowed later physicians to attempt to analyze disruptions of mental processes; and many of these analyses have entered into the textbooks of neurology.

The self-portraits of artists who suffered mental illnesses give a unique possibility to physicians for investigating self-perception in people with psychological, psychiatric or neurologic disturbances. Some of the more prolific examples include William Utermohlen and Bryan Charnley.

Russian sexologist Igor Kon in his article about masturbation notes that a habit of masturbating may be depicted in works of art, particularly paintings. So Austrian artist Egon Schiele depicted himself so occupied in one of his self-portraits. Kon observes that this painting does not portray pleasure from the masturbation, but a feeling of solitude. Creations of Schiele are analyzed by other researchers in terms of sexuality, and particularly pedophilia.

== Collections ==
One of the most distinguished, and oldest, collections of self-portraits is in the Vasari Corridor of the Uffizi Gallery in Florence. It was originally the collection by the Cardinal Leopoldo de' Medici in the second part of the 17th century and has been maintained and expanded until the present time. It is mostly not on view for general visitors, although some paintings are shown in the main galleries. Many famous artists have not been able to resist an invitation to donate a self-portrait to the collection. It comprises more than 200 portraits, in particular those of Pietro da Cortona, Charles Le Brun, Jean-Baptiste-Camille Corot, and Marc Chagall. Other important collections are housed at the National Portrait Gallery (United Kingdom) in London (with various satellite outstations elsewhere), and the National Portrait Gallery in Washington, D.C..

=== Gallery ===
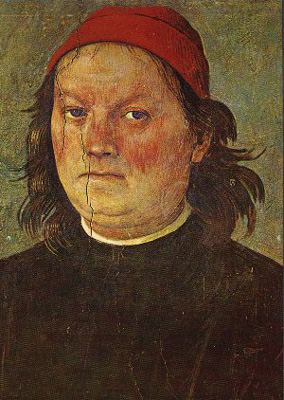
Pietro Perugino, c. 1500

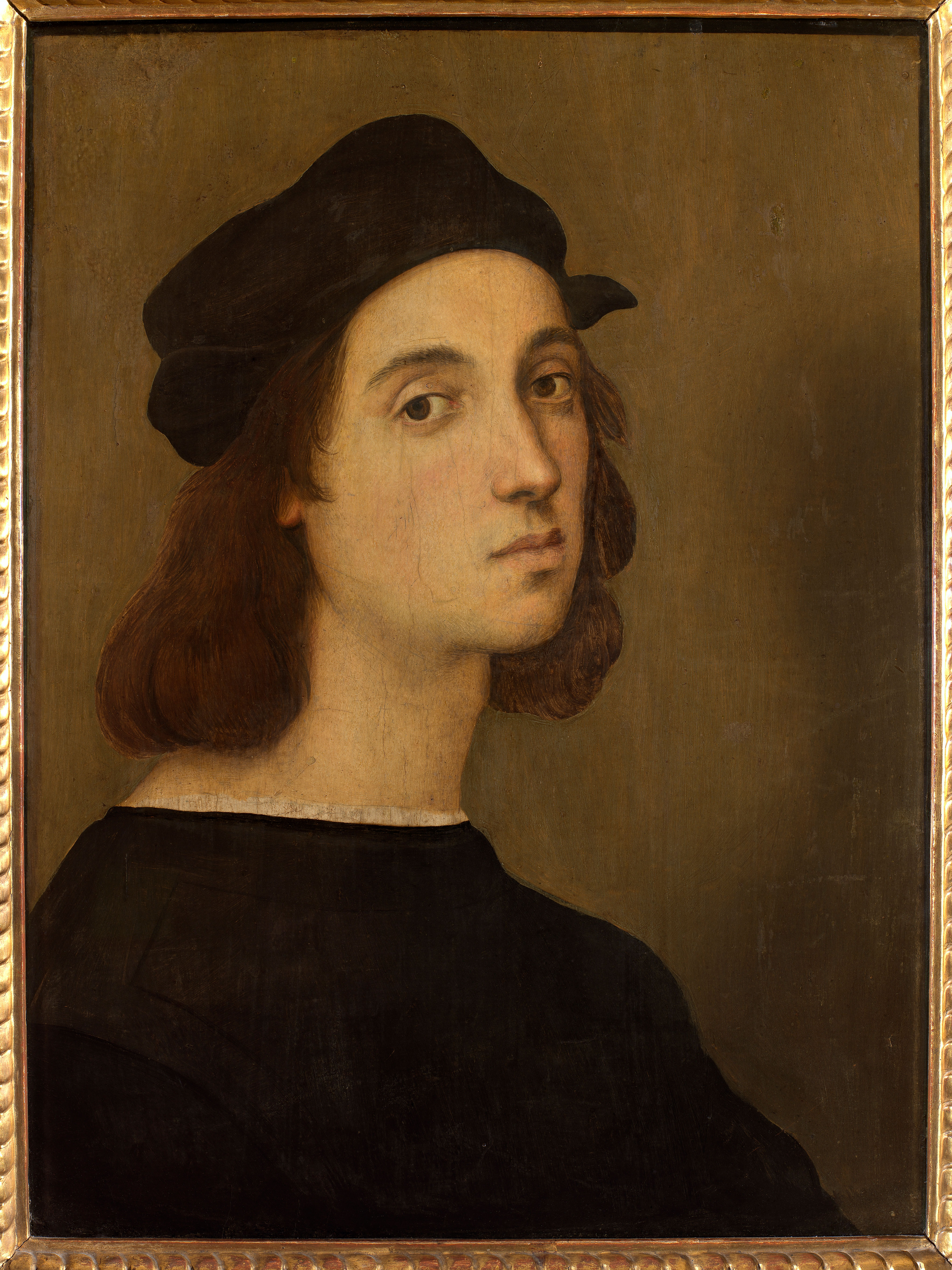
Raphael, c. 1517–1518, Uffizi Gallery

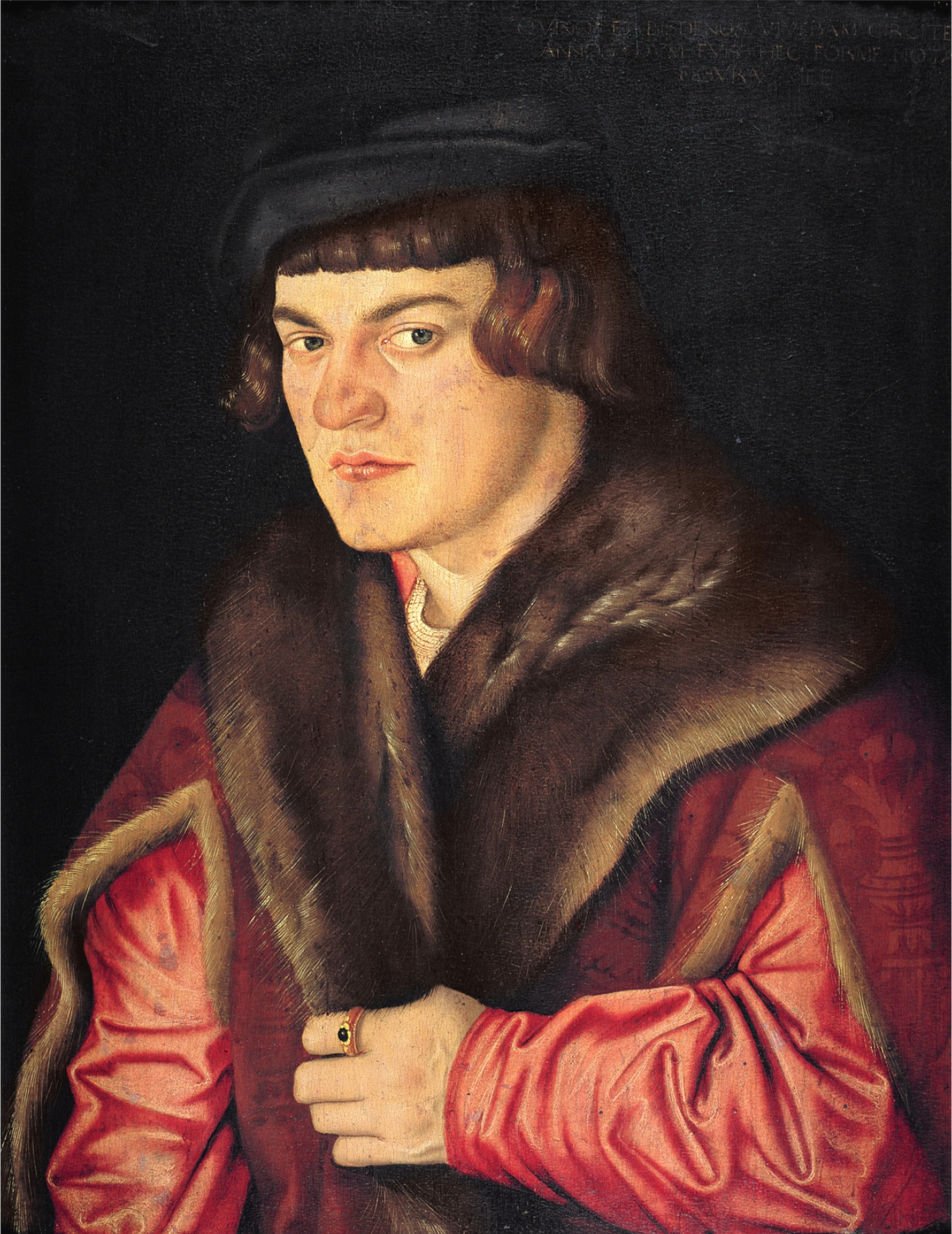
Hans Baldung, 1526

Titian seems to have painted no self-portraits until he was in old age, 1567

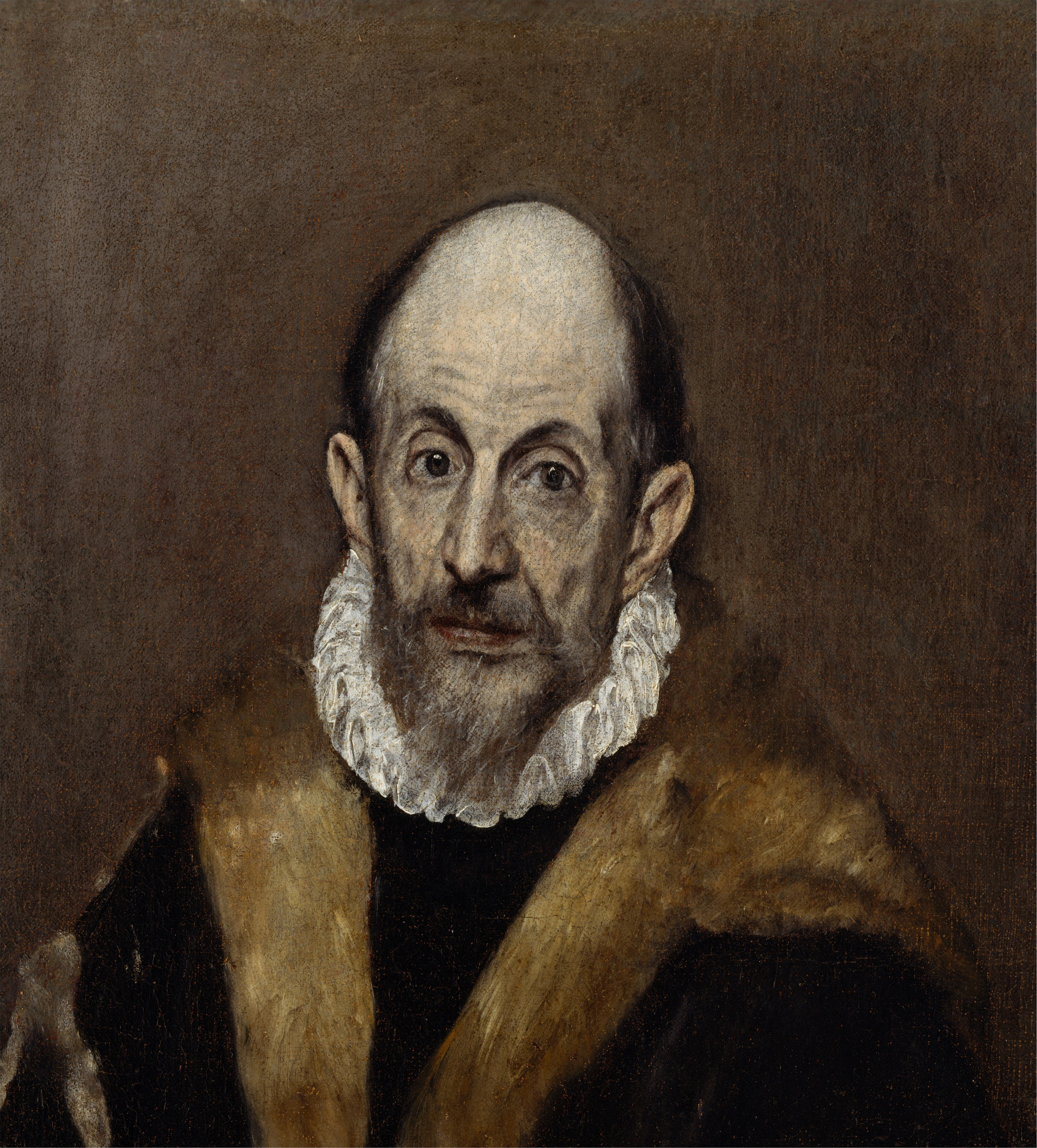
Probable self-portrait by El Greco, 1604

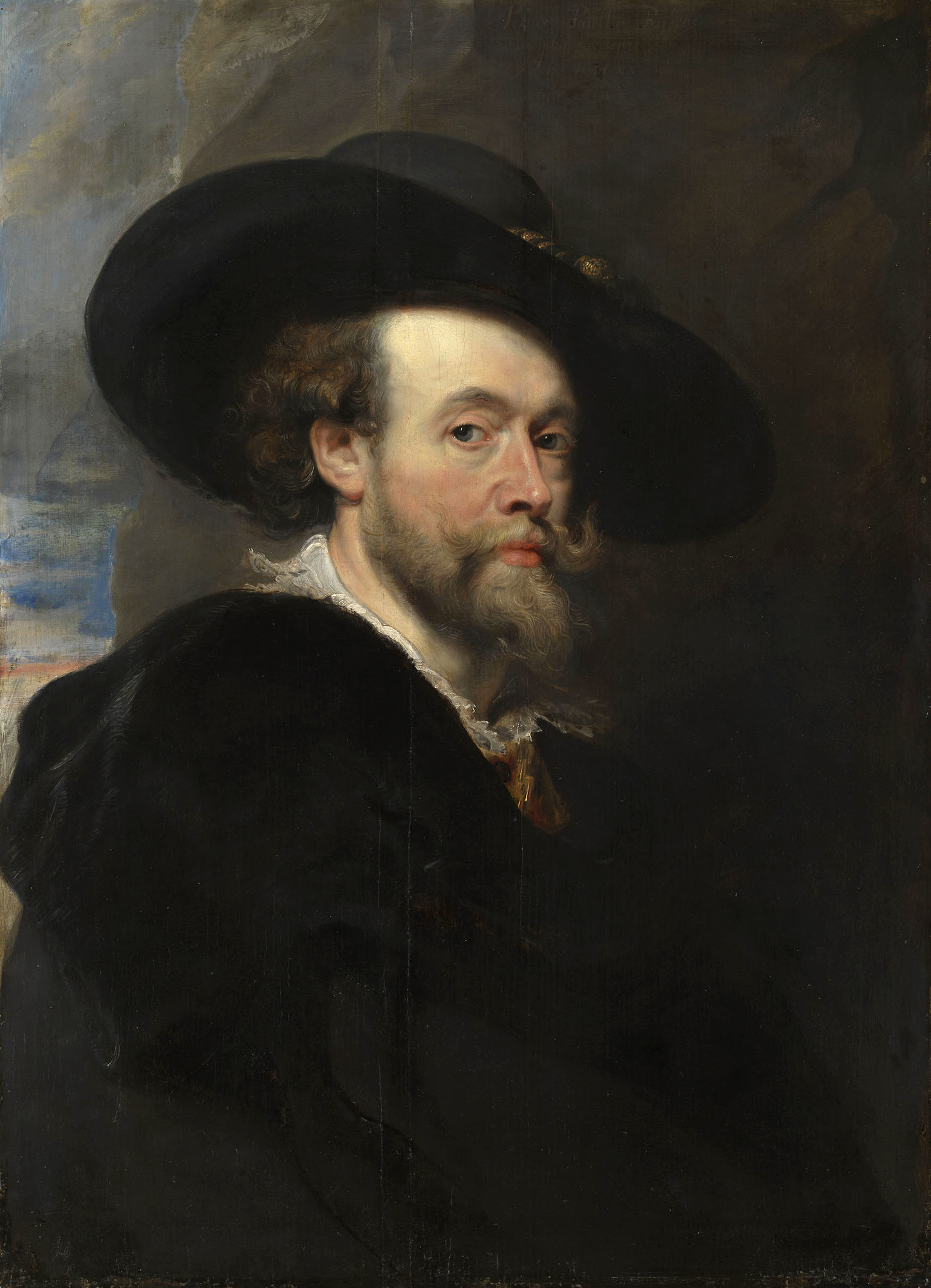
Peter Paul Rubens, 1623

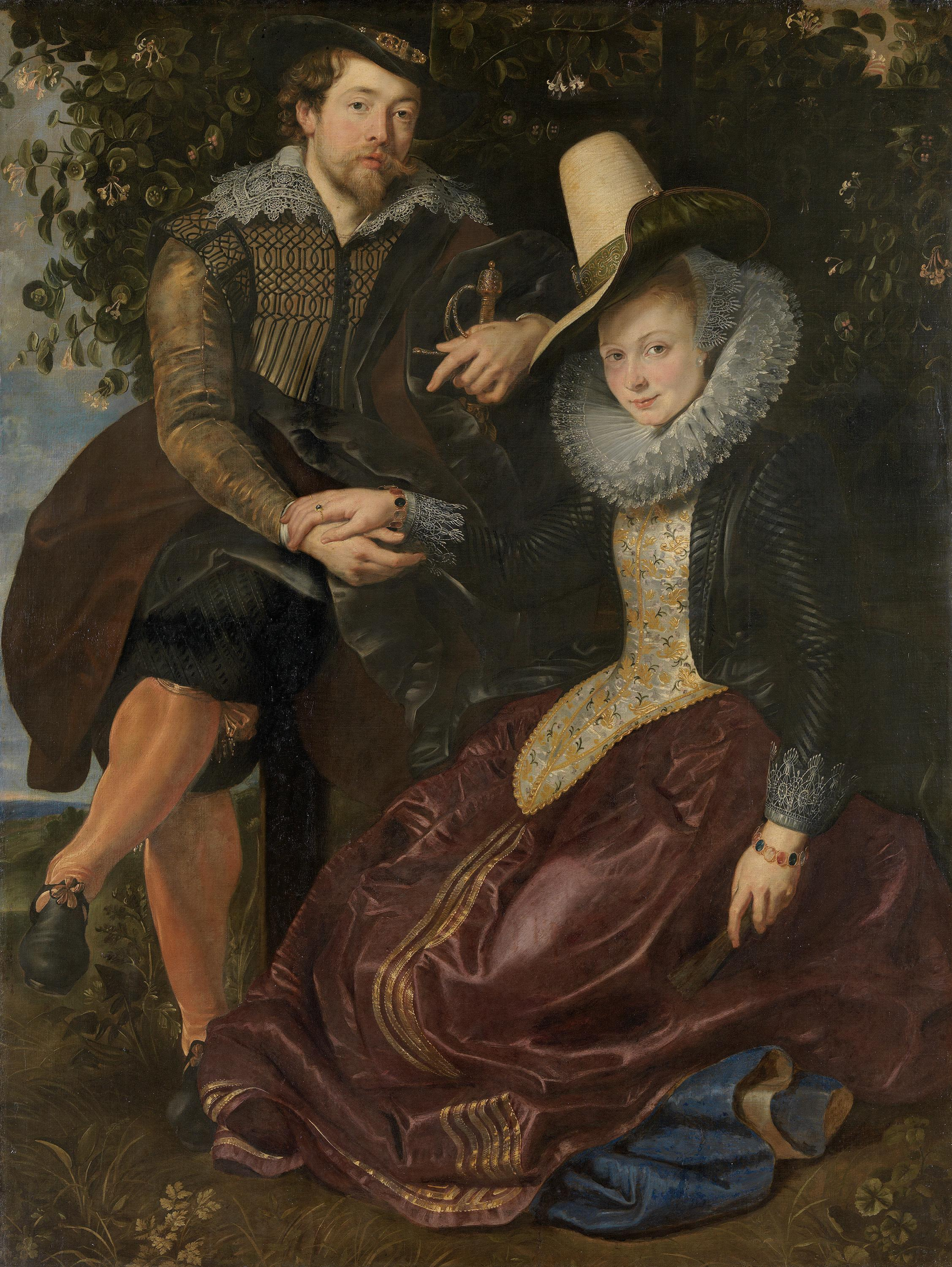
Rubens with his (first) wife Isabella Brant, Munich, c. 1609

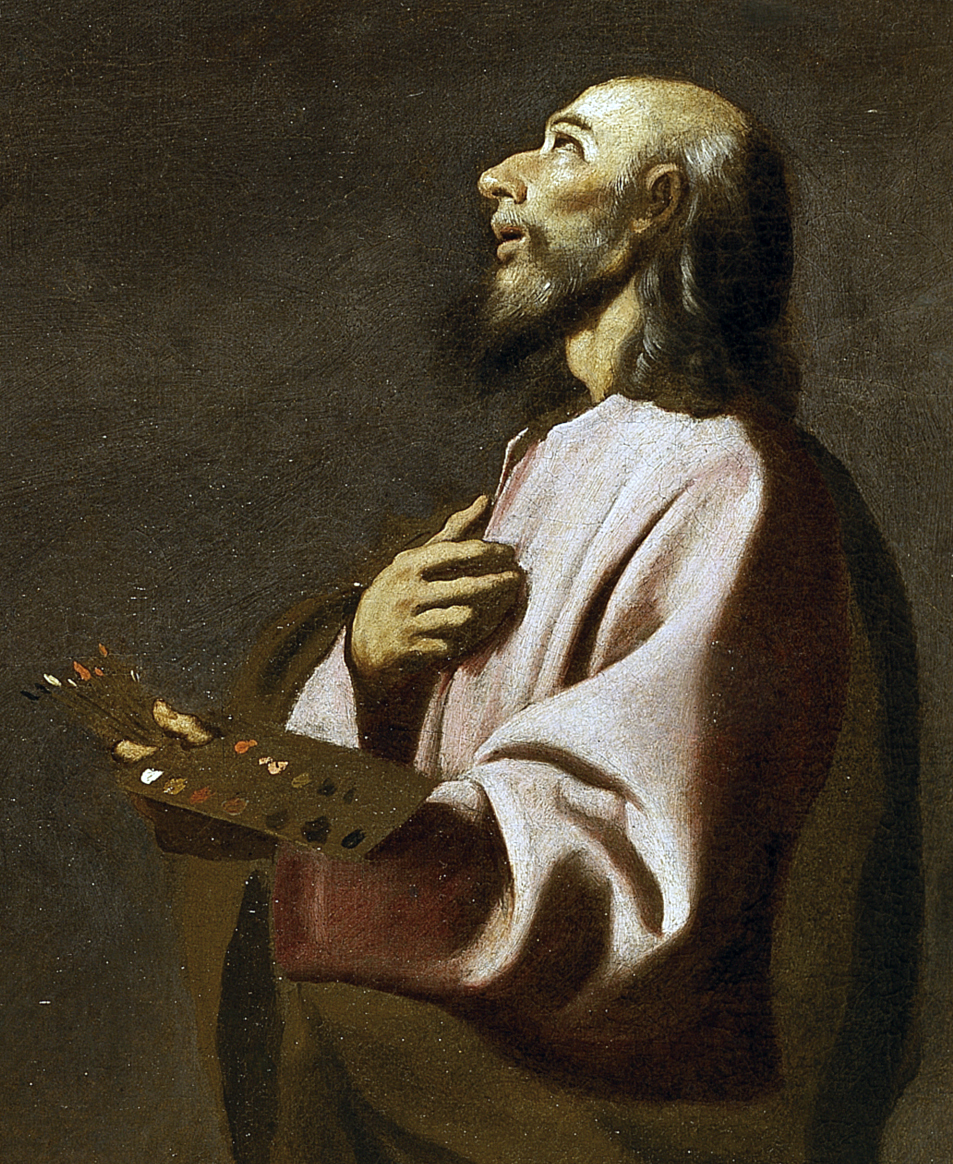
Self-portrait of Francisco Zurbarán, as Saint Luke.
Detail of Saint Luke as a Painter Before the Crucifixion

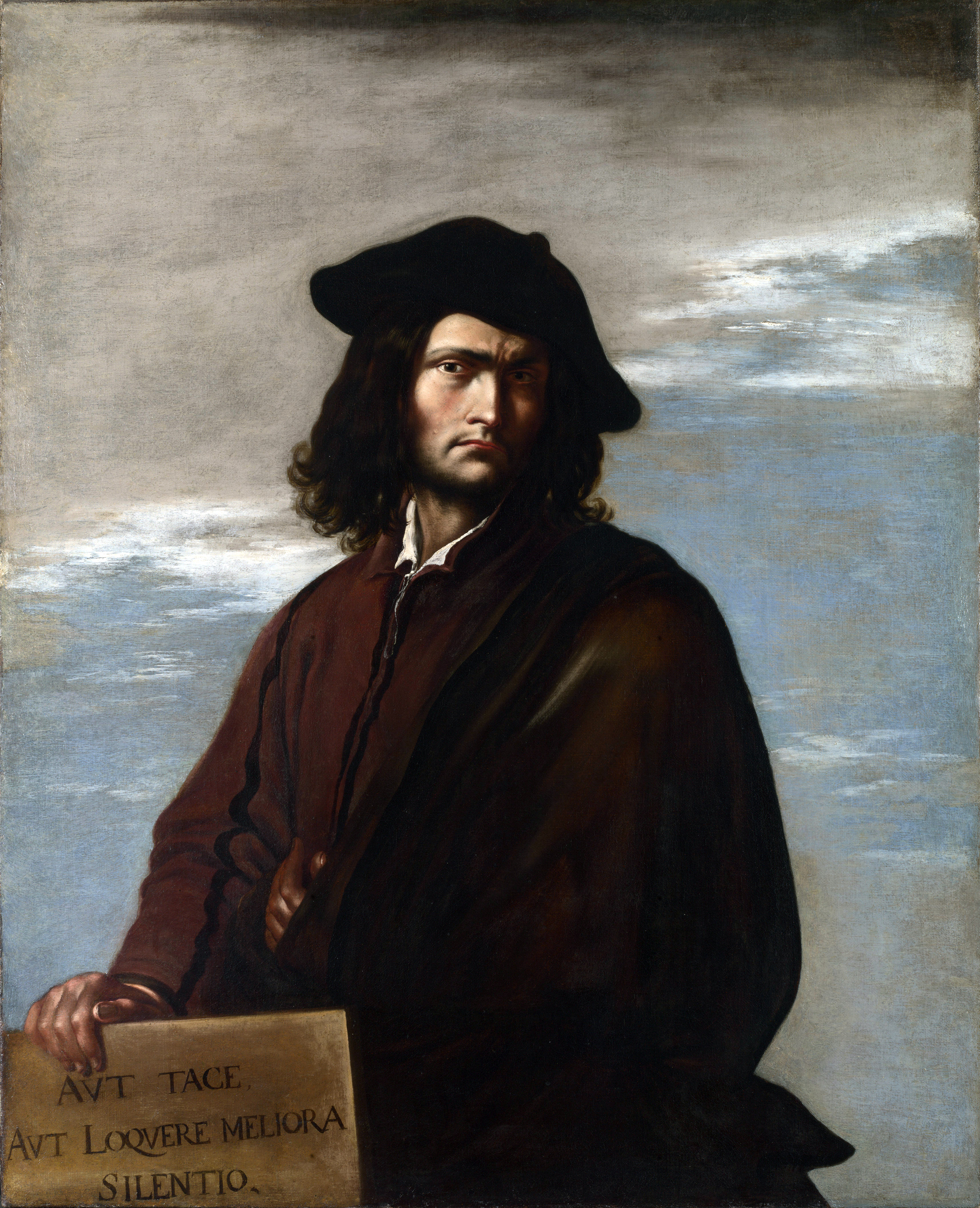
Salvator Rosa, 1640. "Of Silence and Speech, Silence is better" says the inscription

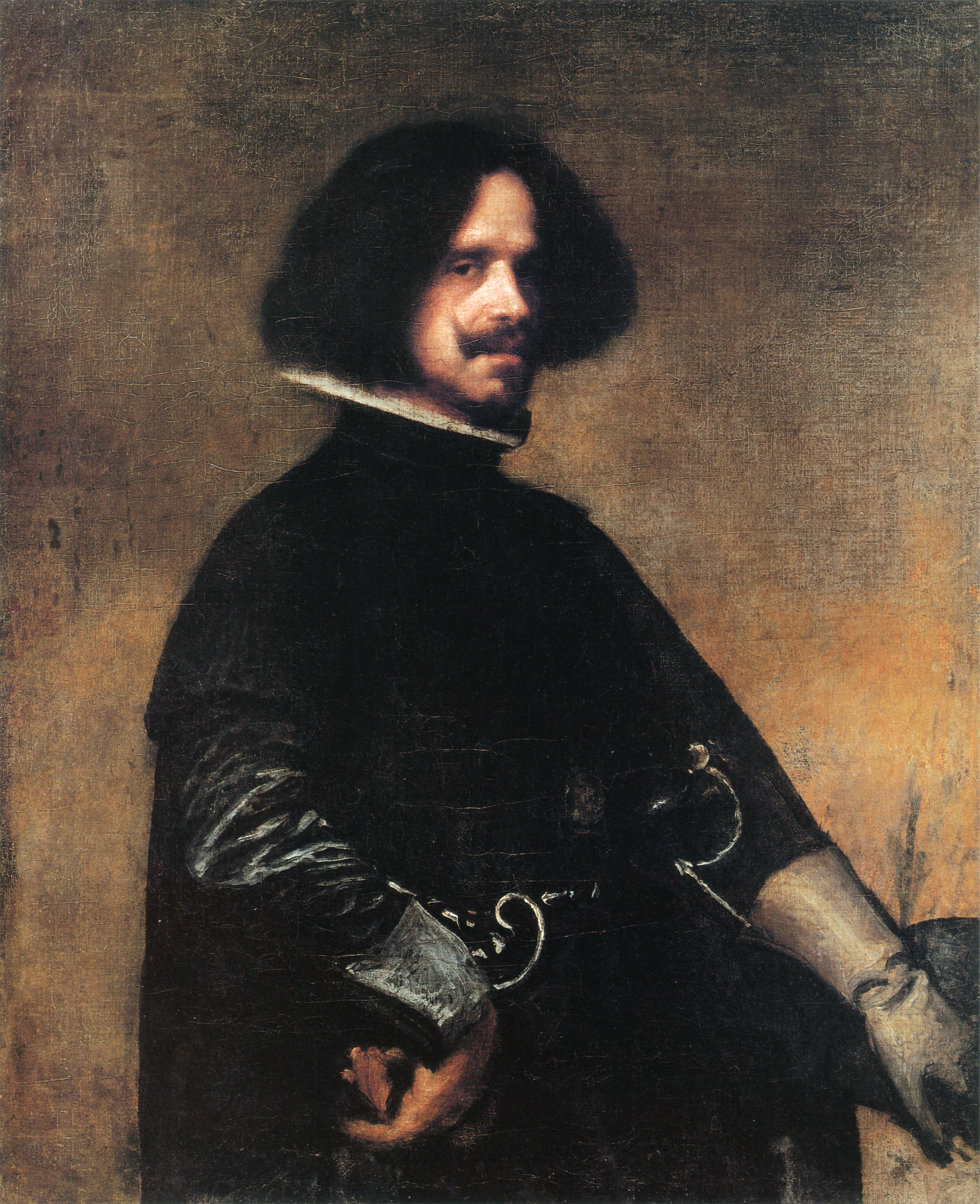
Diego Velázquez, Self-Portrait, 1643

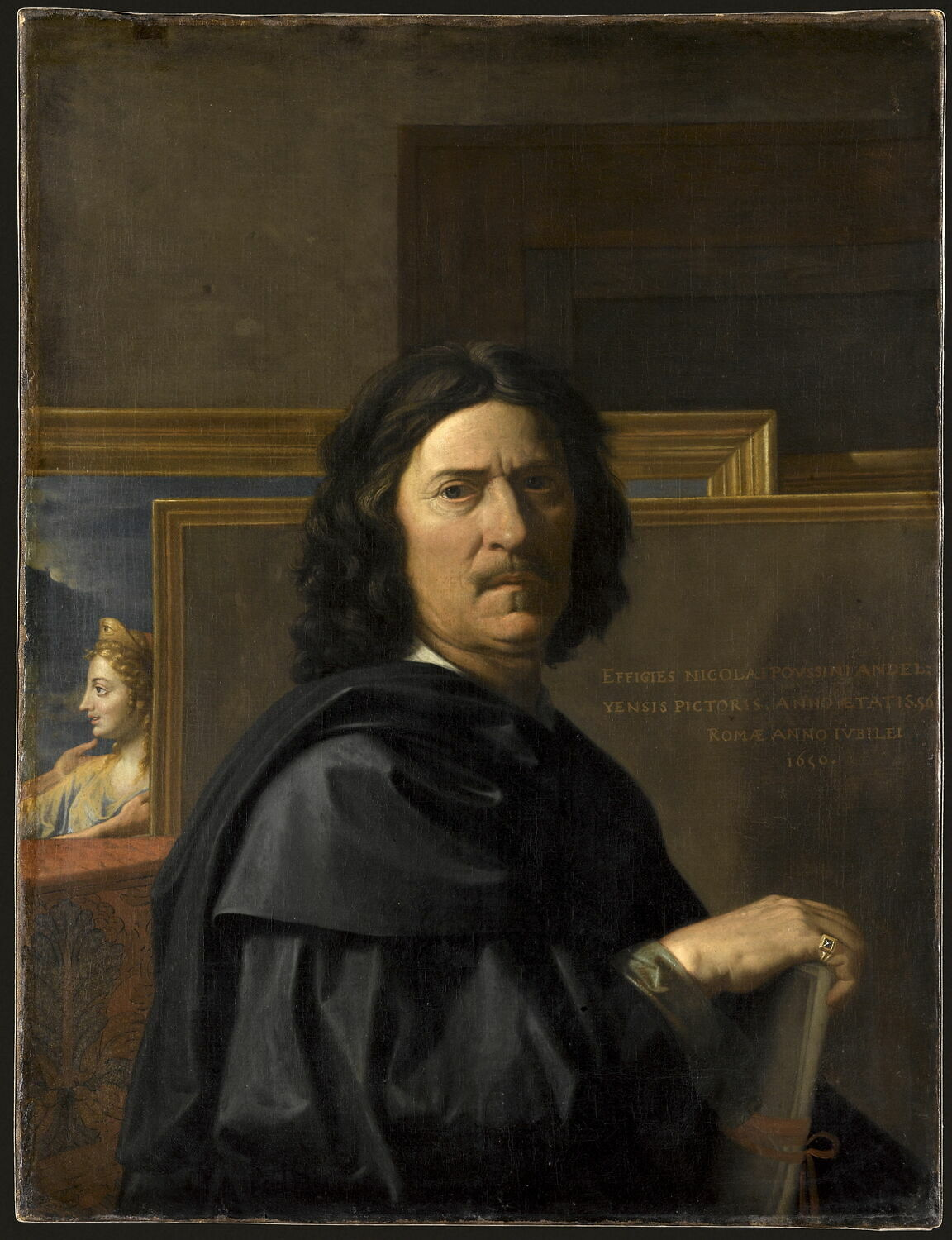
Nicolas Poussin, Self-Portrait, 1650

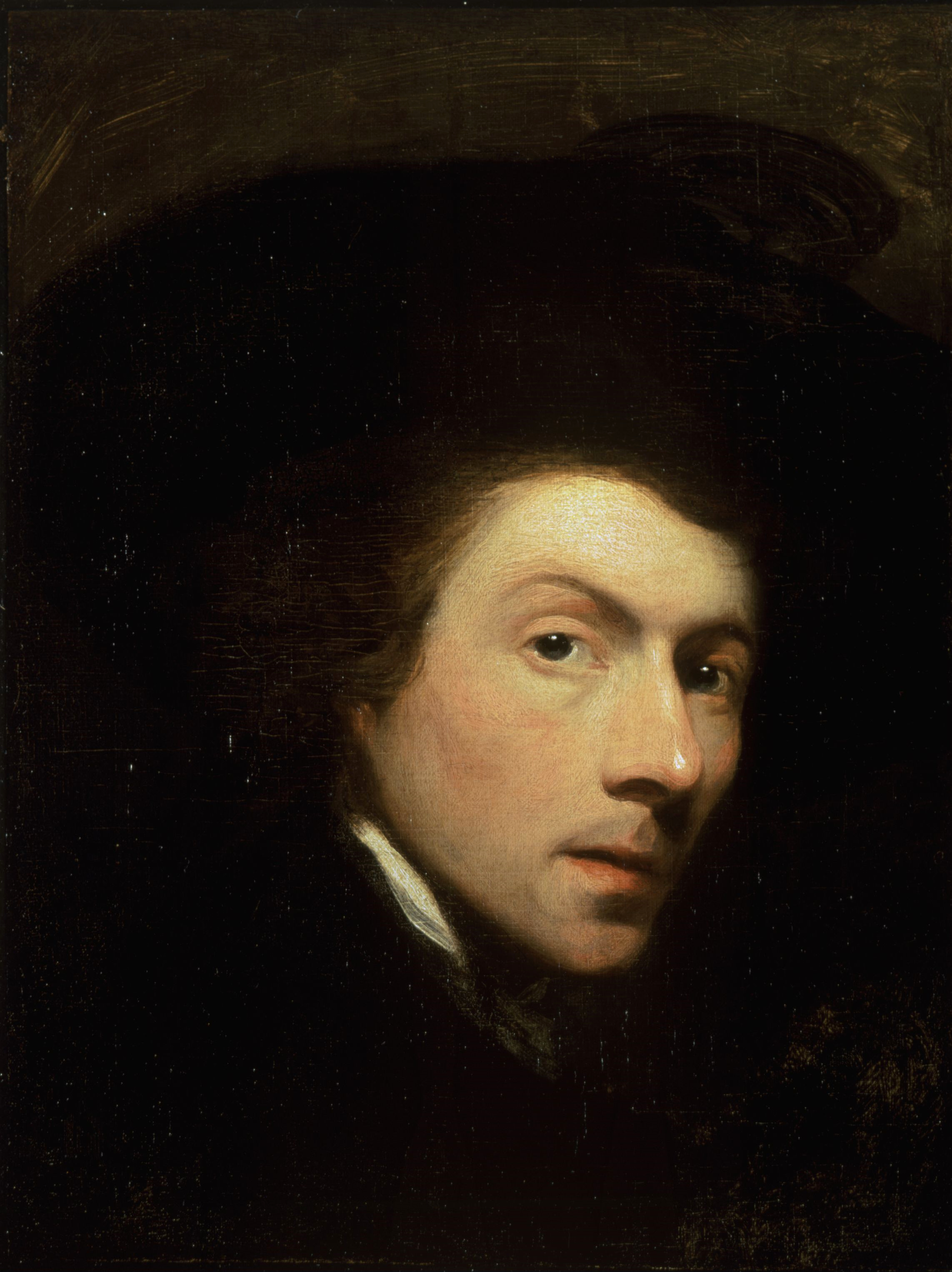
Gilbert Stuart, Self-portrait, 1778

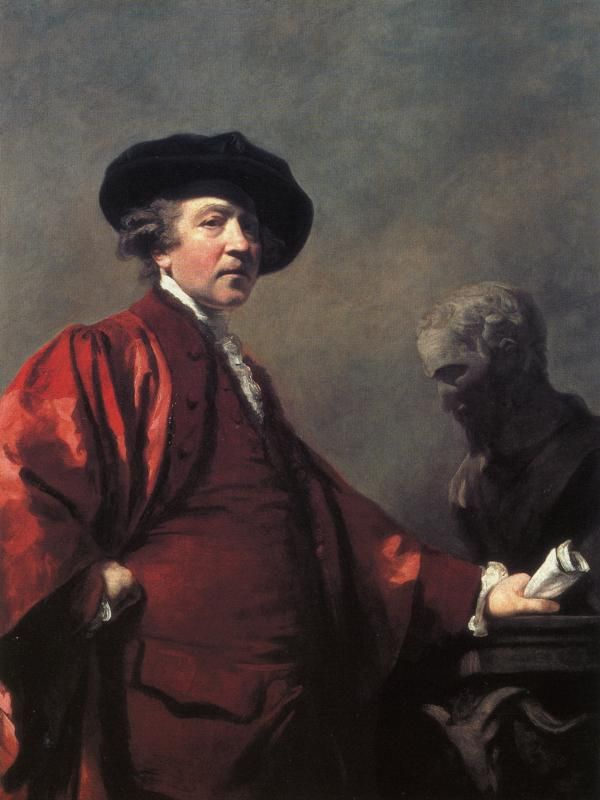
Self-Portrait by Joshua Reynolds, presented to the Royal Academy, of which he was first President. Rather like Rembrandt, but more successful, 1780

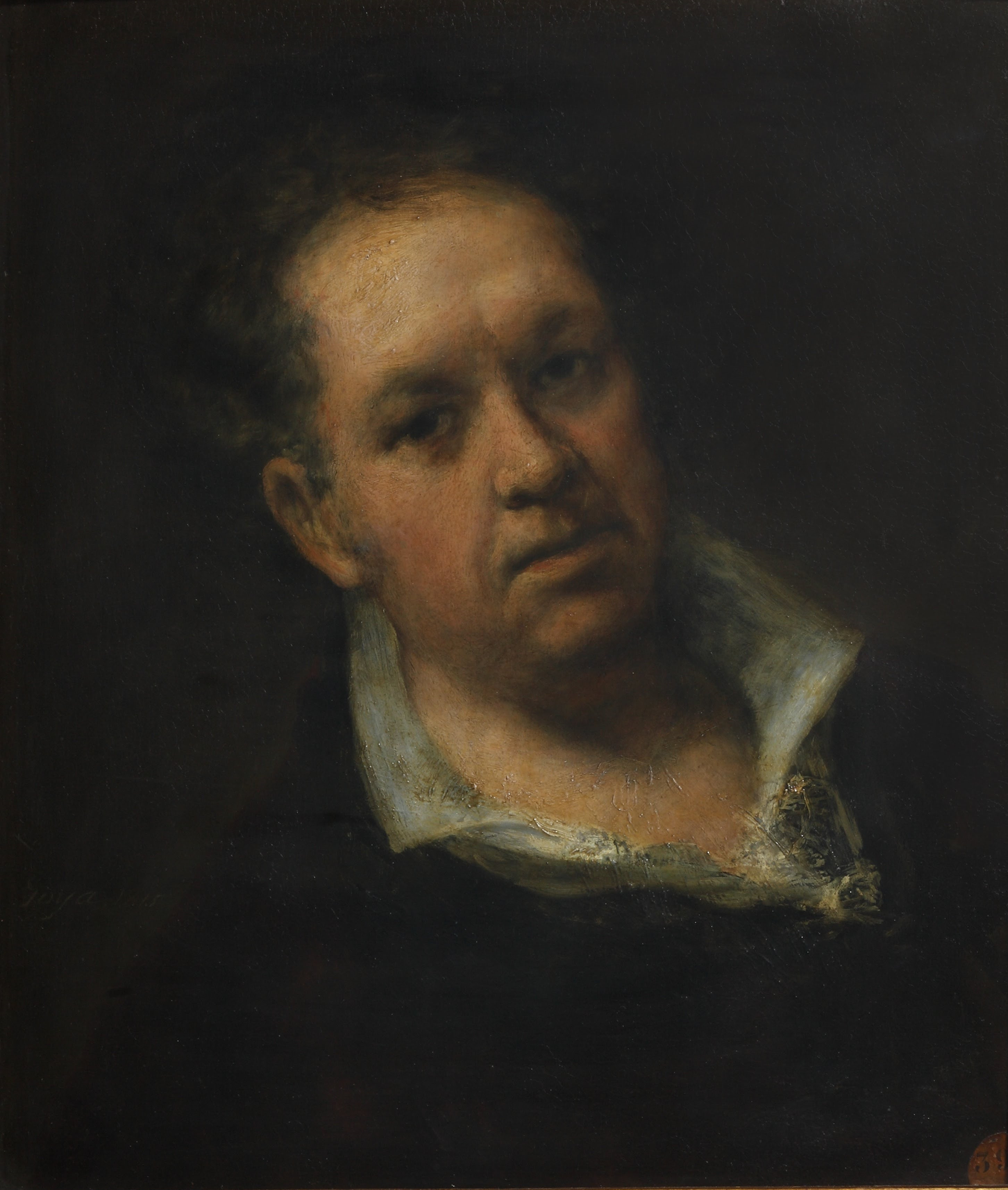
Francisco Goya, 1815 Oil on panel, Museo de la Real Academia de San Fernando, Madrid

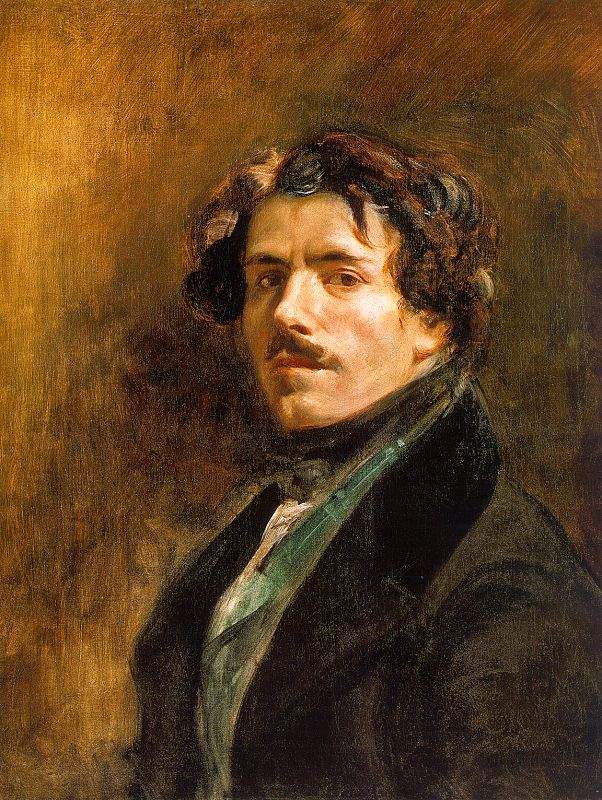
Eugène Delacroix, 1837

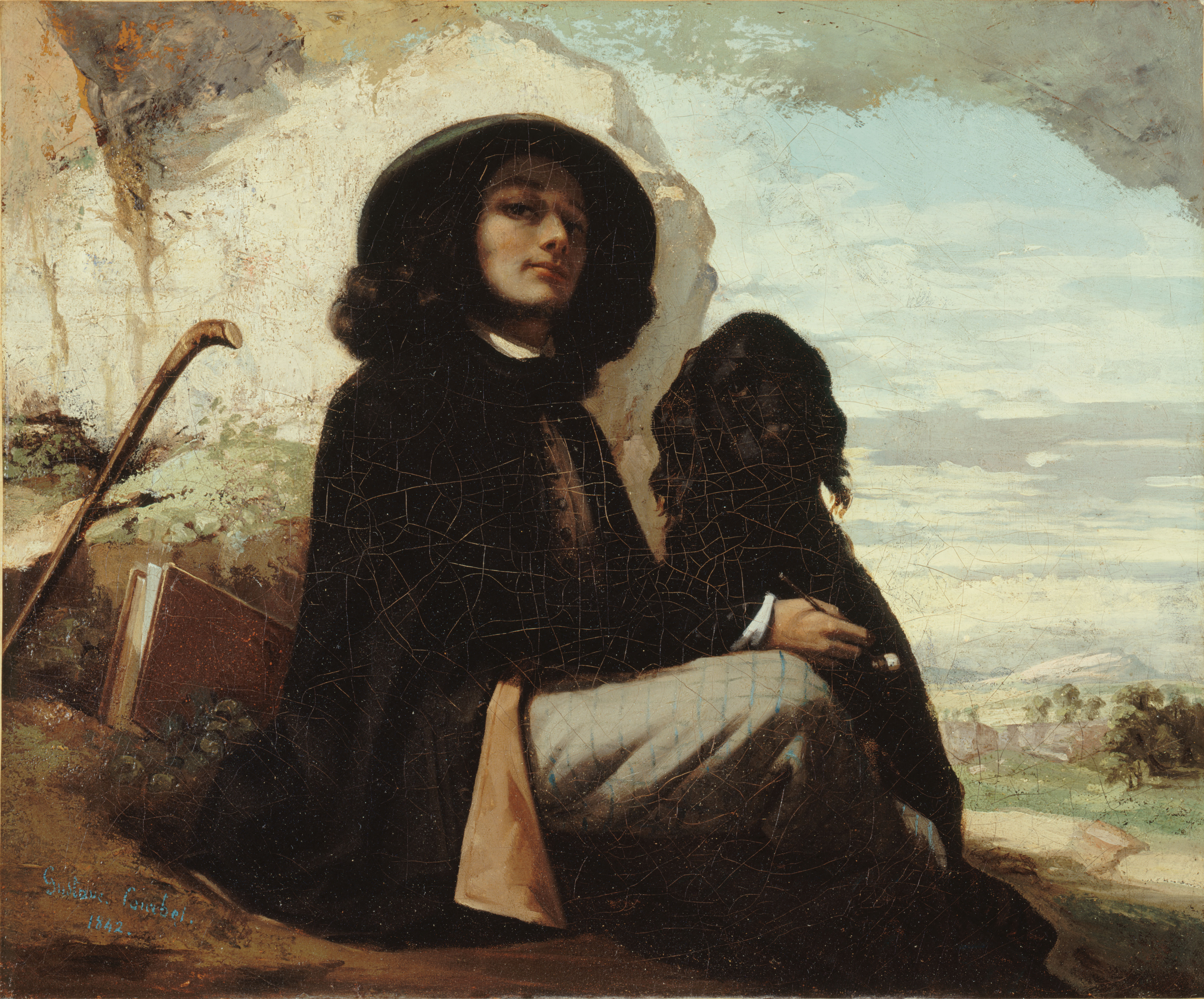
Gustave Courbet, 1842

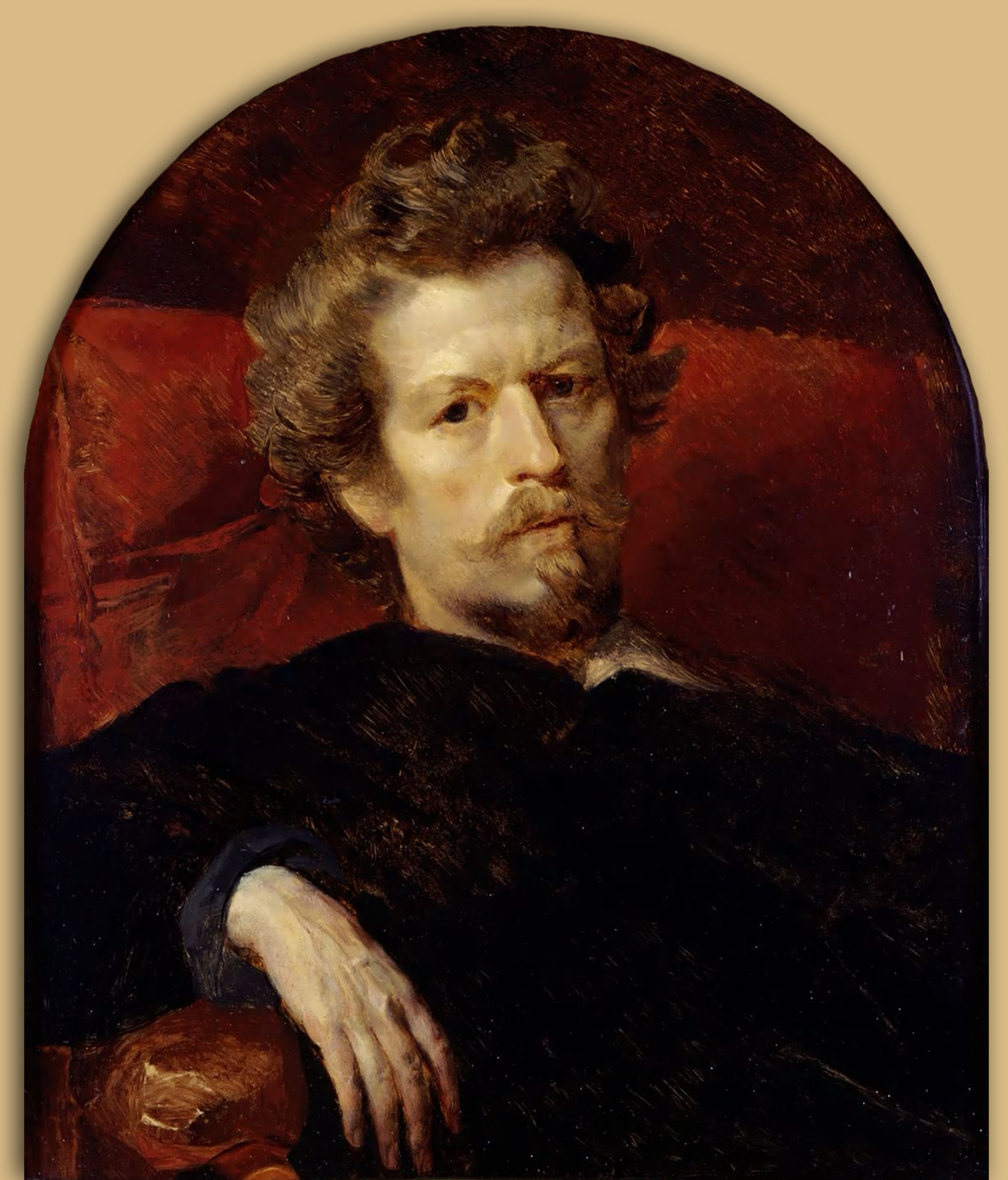
Karl Bryullov, 1848

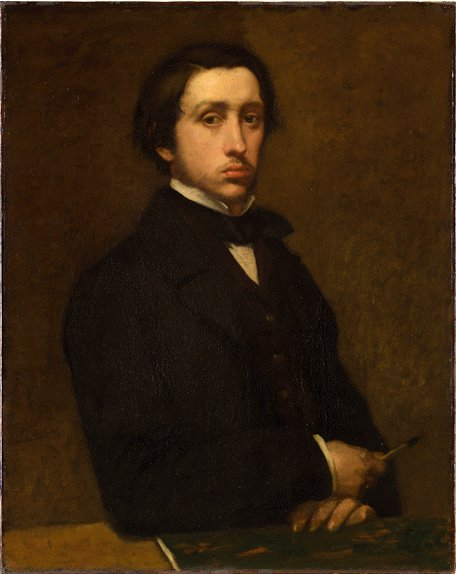
Edgar Degas, Self-portrait, 1855

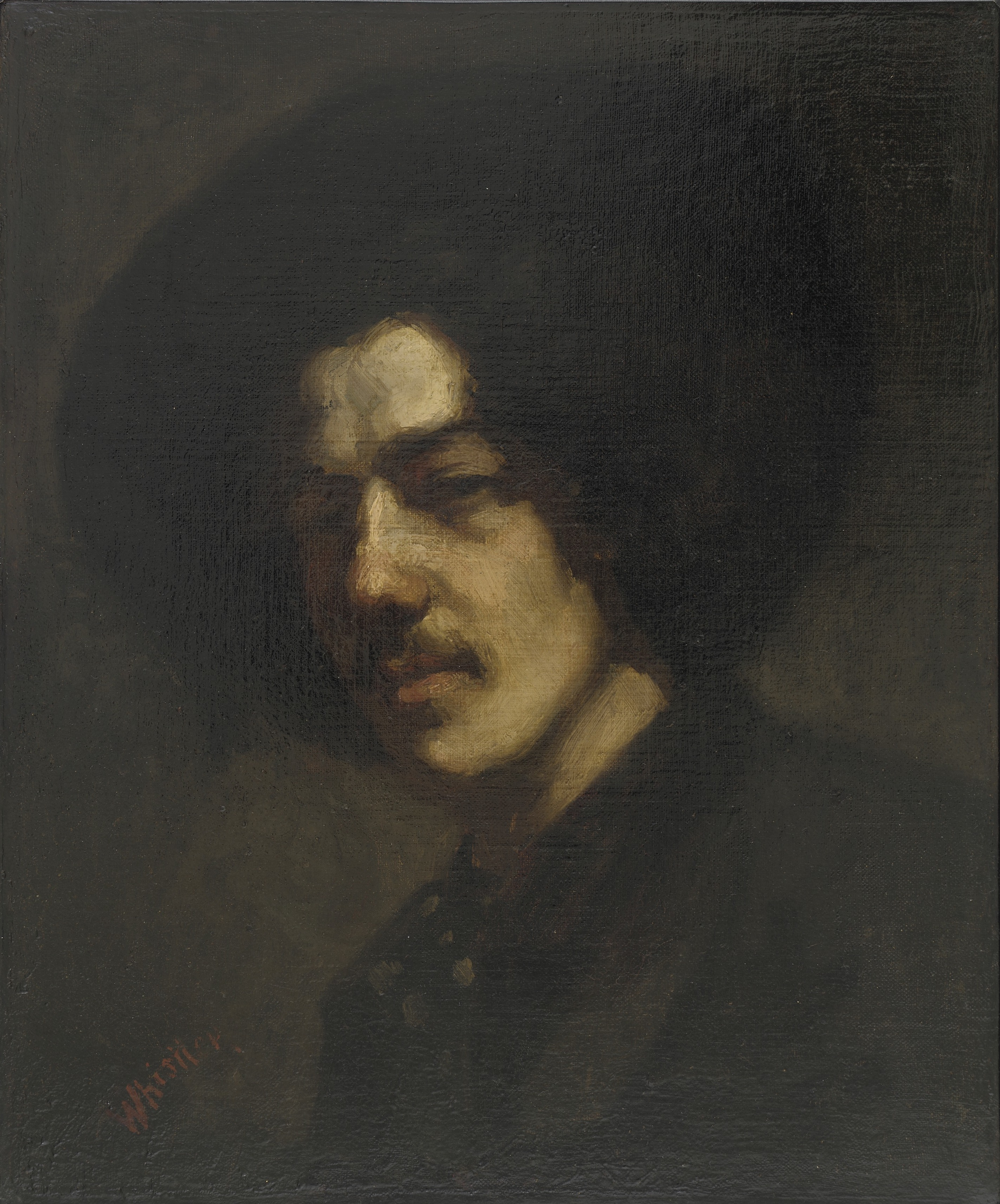
James McNeill Whistler, Portrait of Whistler with Hat, 1858, a self-portrait at the Freer Gallery of Art, Washington, D.C.

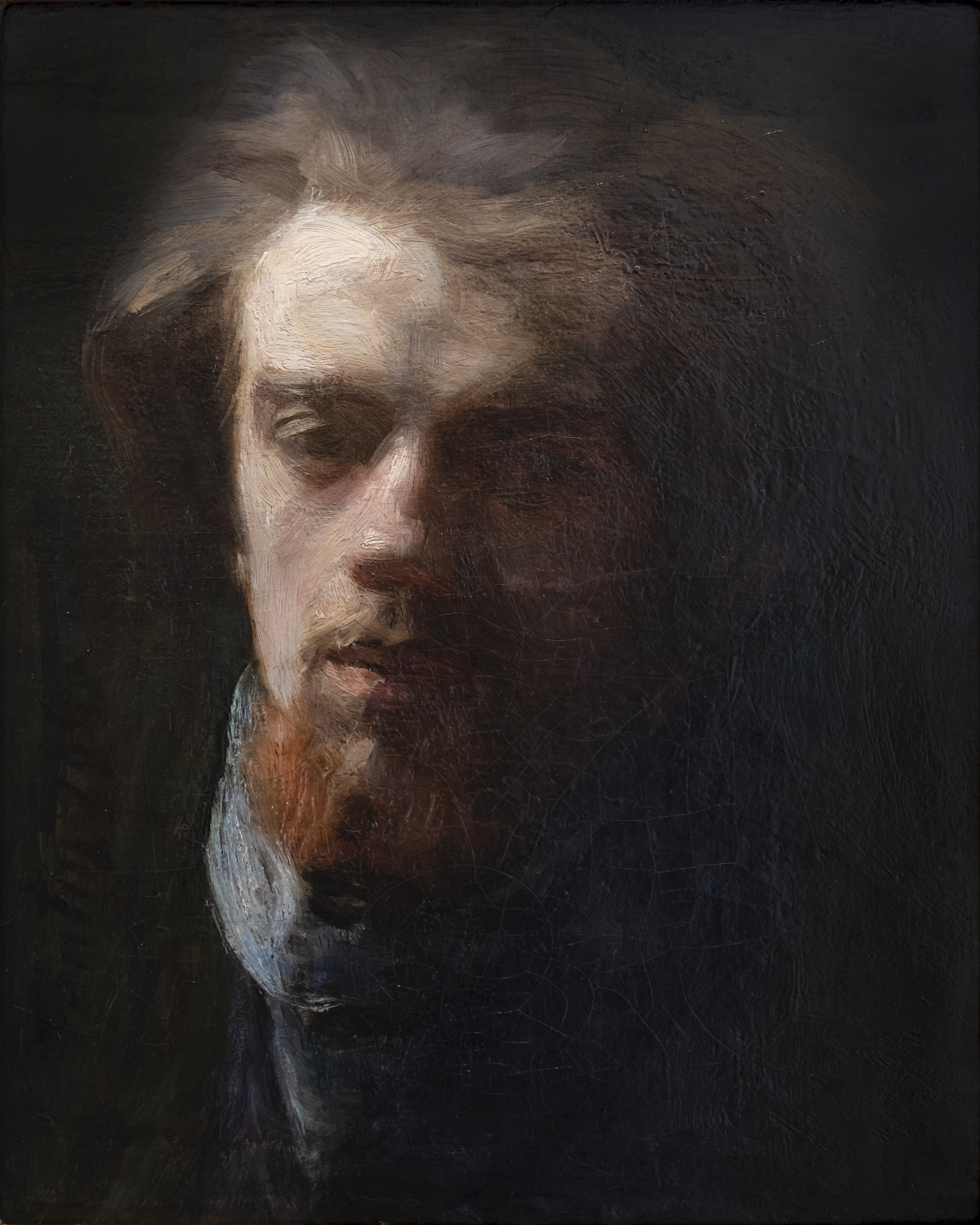
Henri Fantin-Latour, Self-portrait, 1860

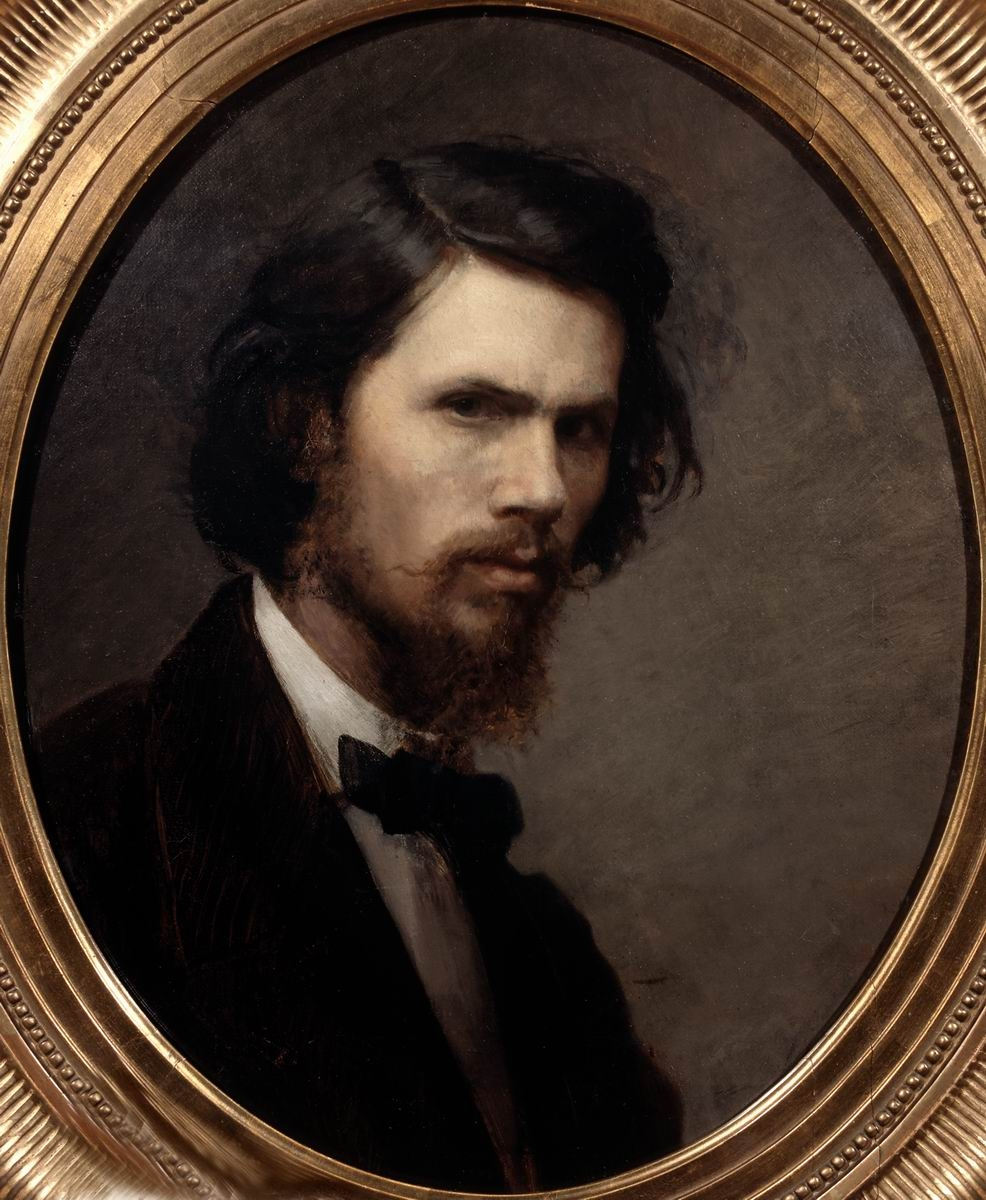
Ivan Kramskoi, Self-portrait, 1867

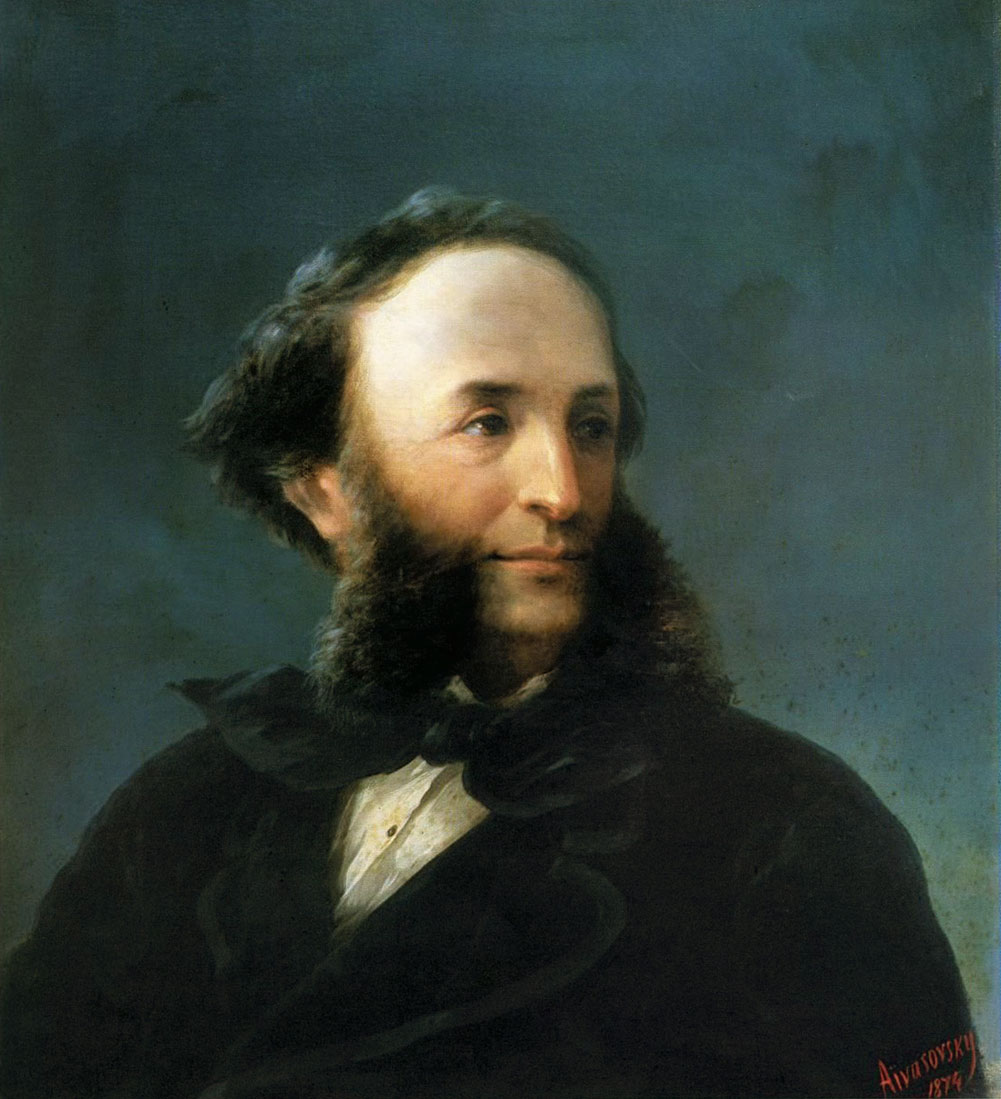
Ivan Aivazovsky, Self-portrait, 1874

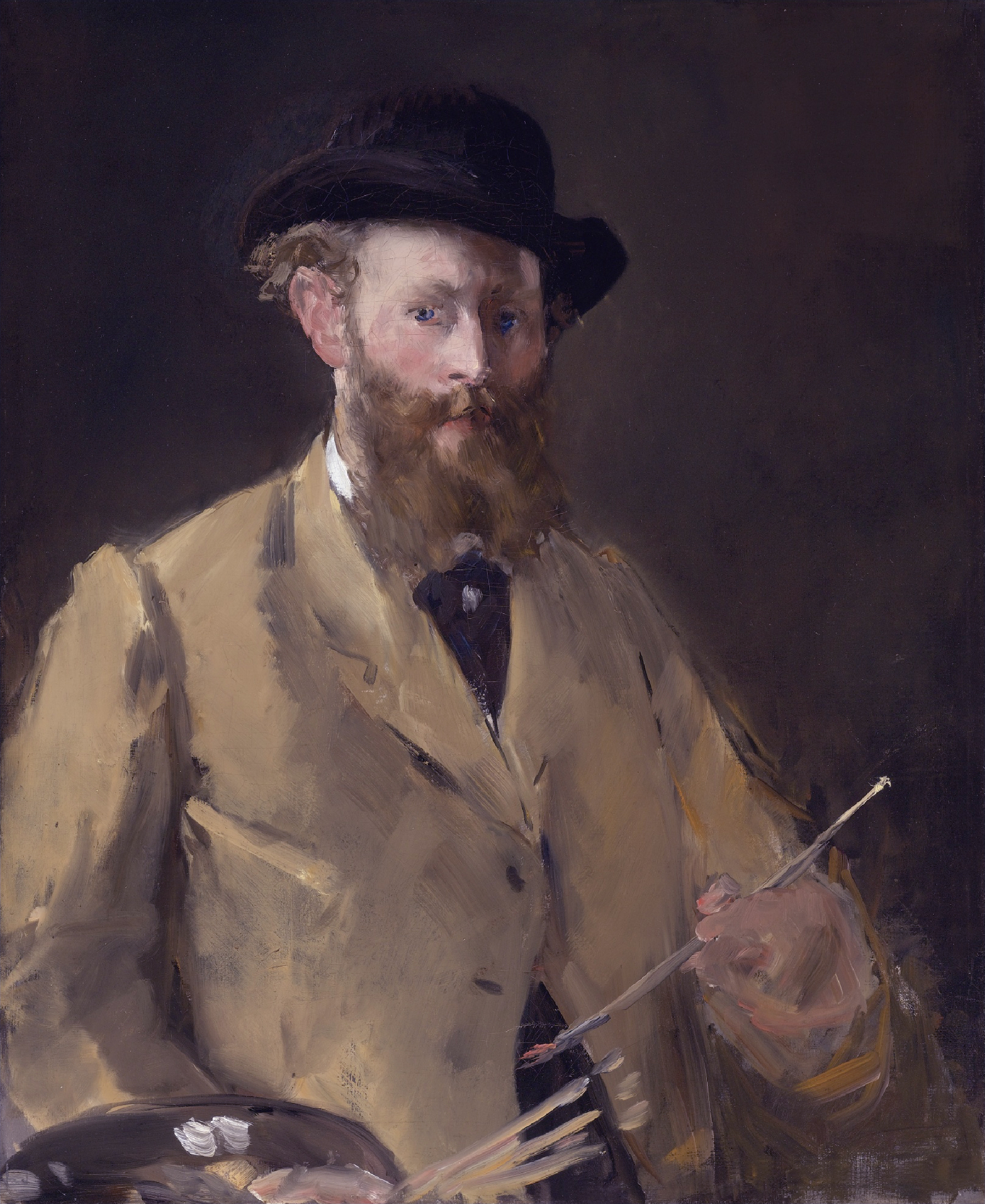
Édouard Manet, Self-Portrait with Palette, 1879

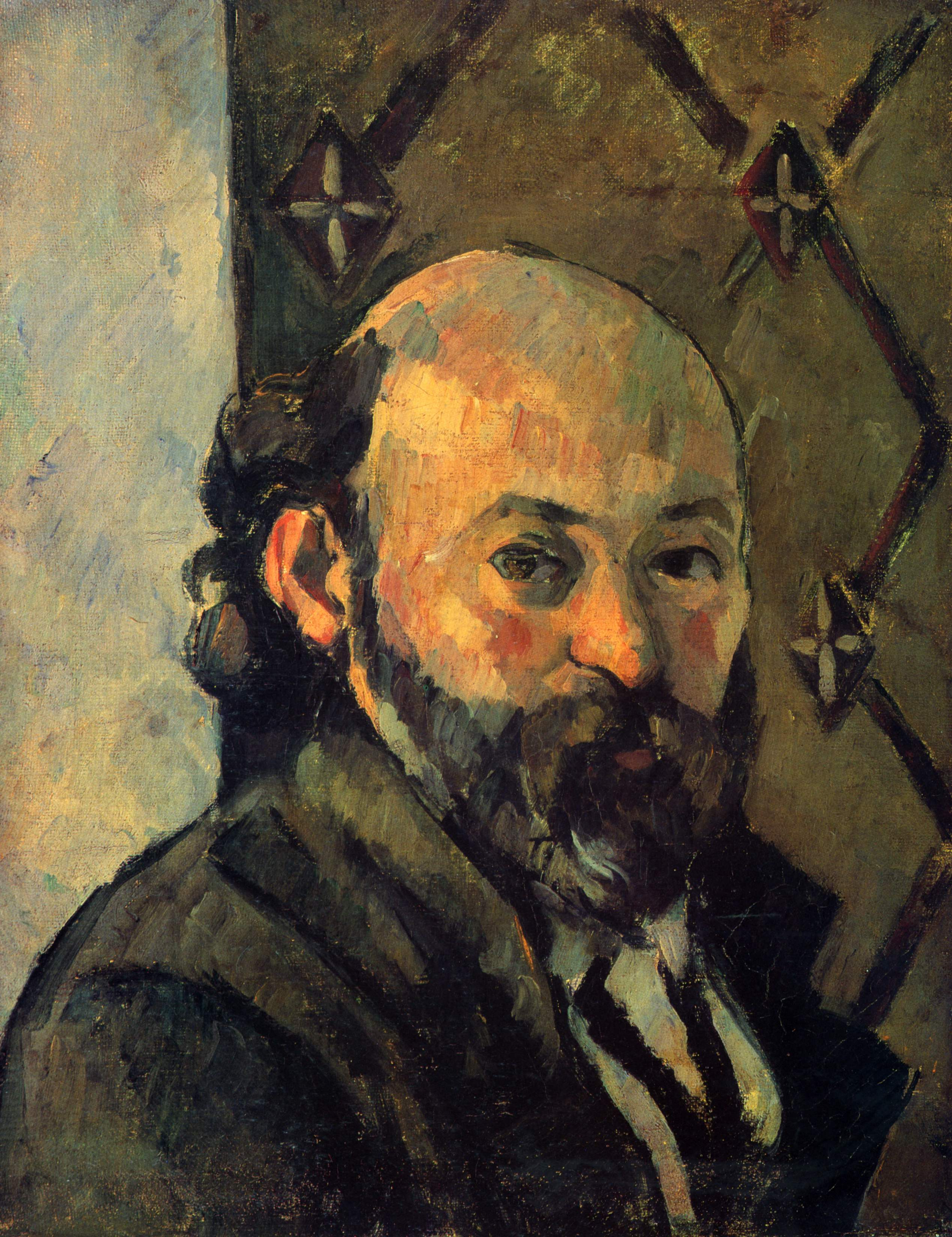
Paul Cézanne, 1880–1881 National Gallery, London

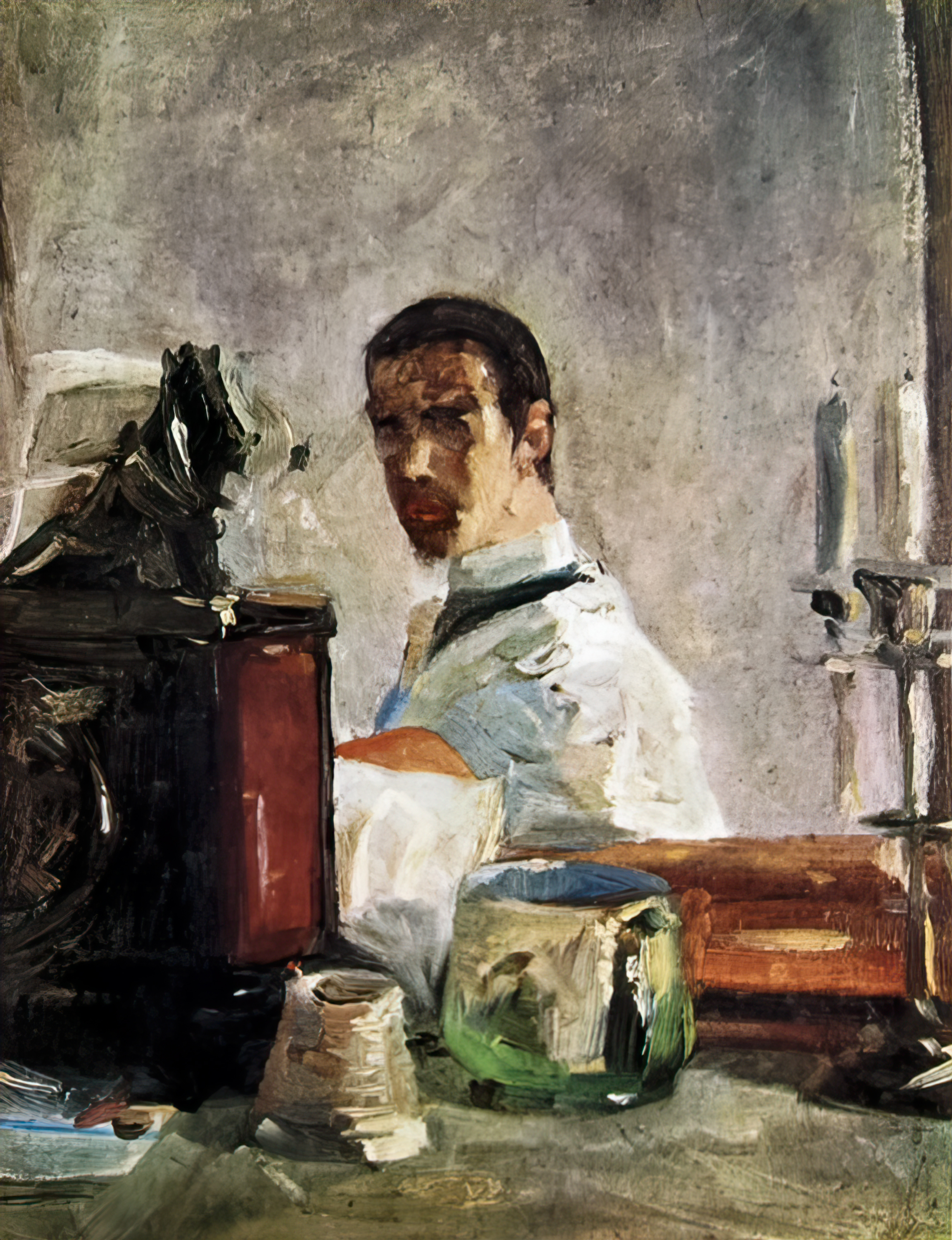
Henri de Toulouse-Lautrec, Self portrait, 1882–1883

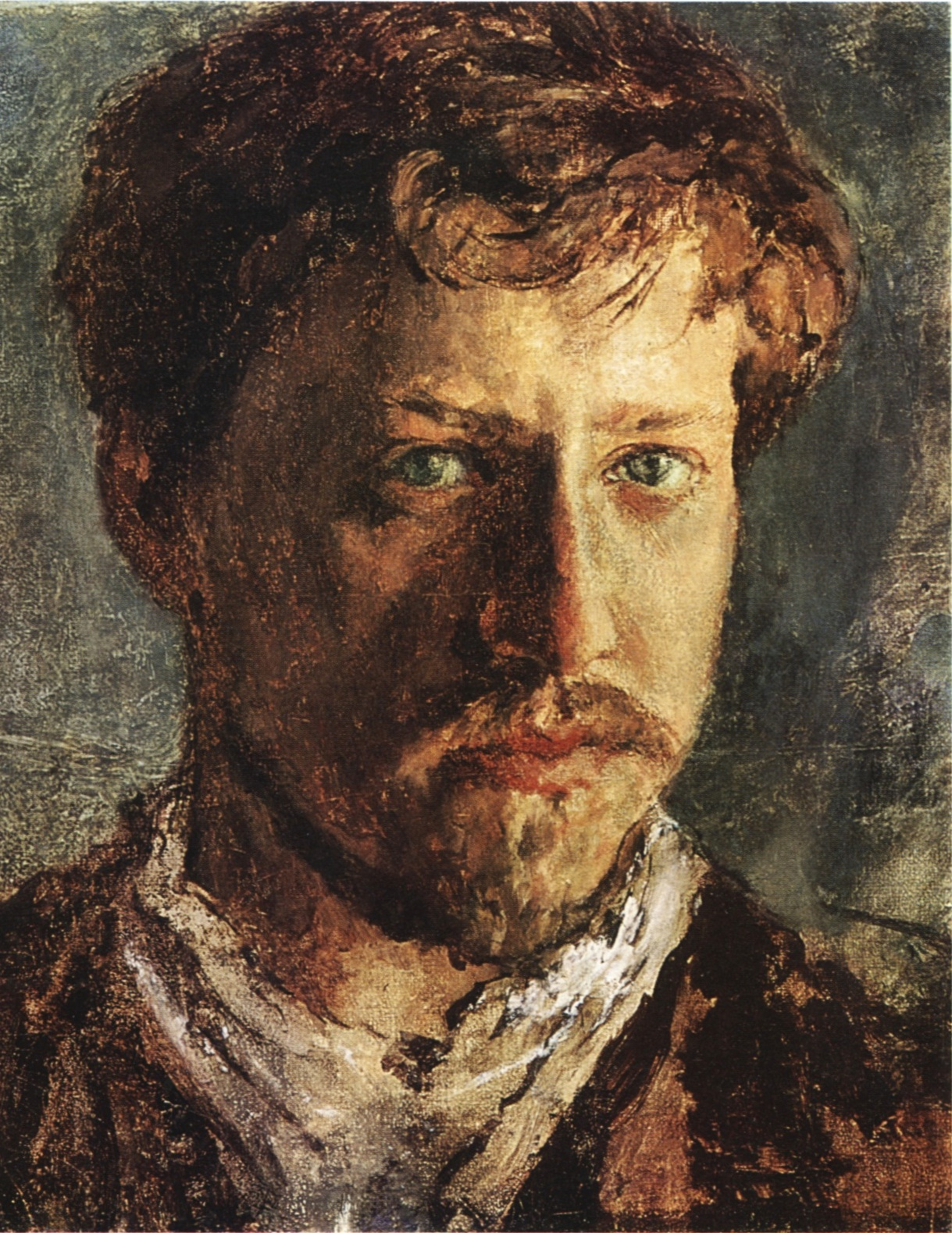
Valentin Serov, 1887

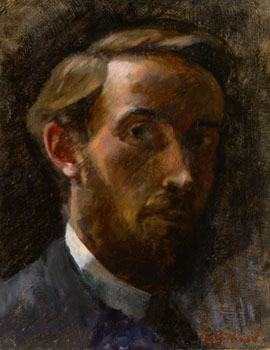
Édouard Vuillard, Self-portrait, 1889

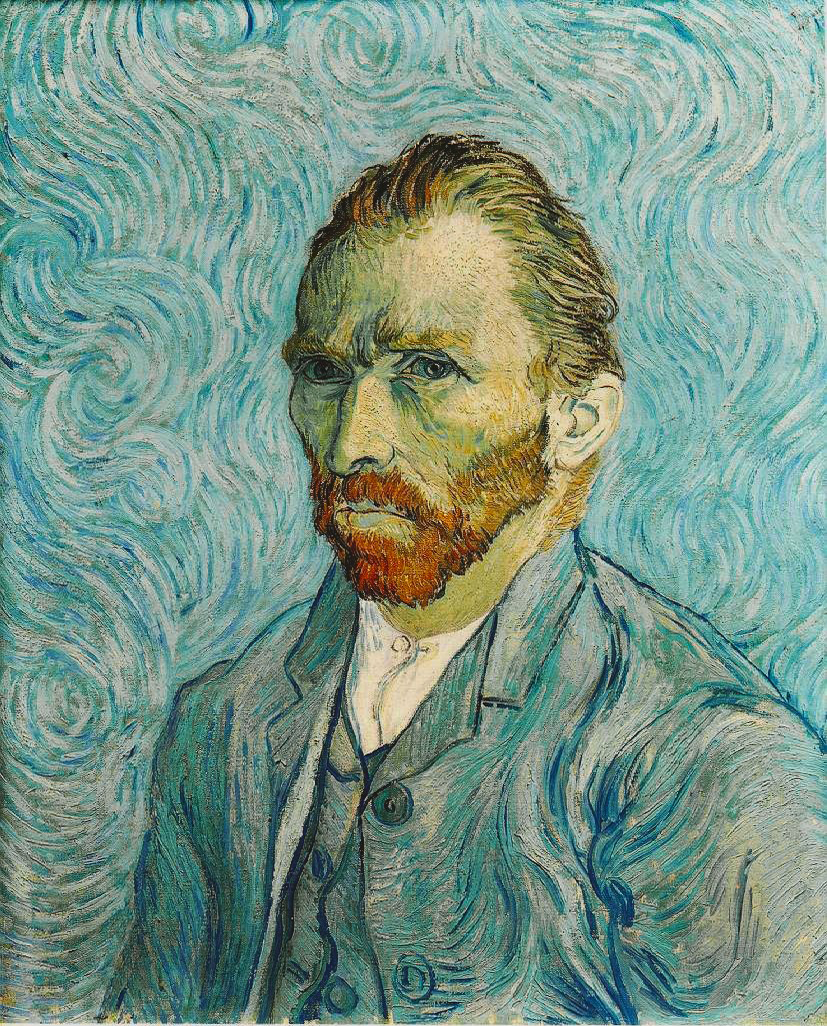
Vincent van Gogh, 1889 Musée d'Orsay Paris

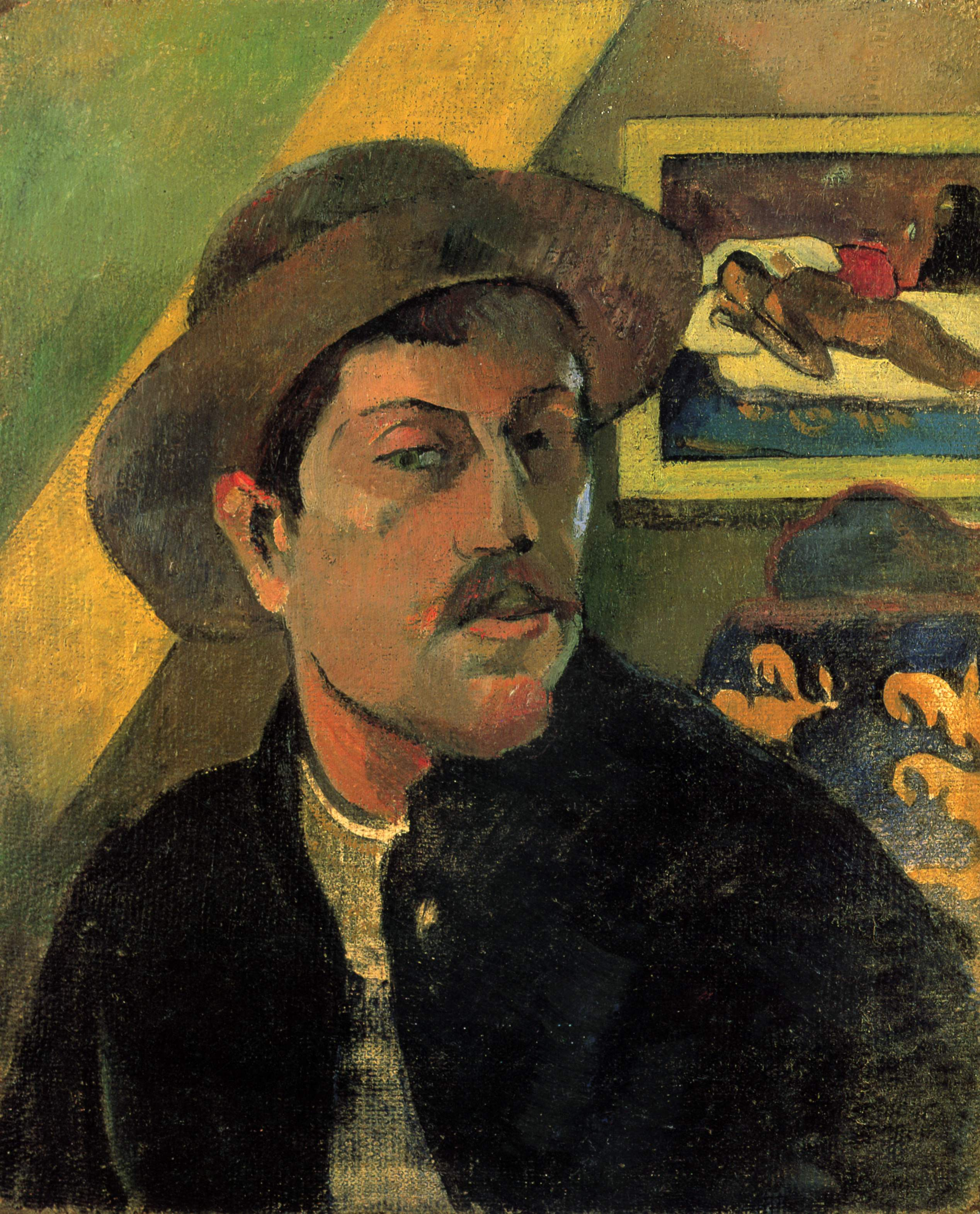
Paul Gauguin, 1893

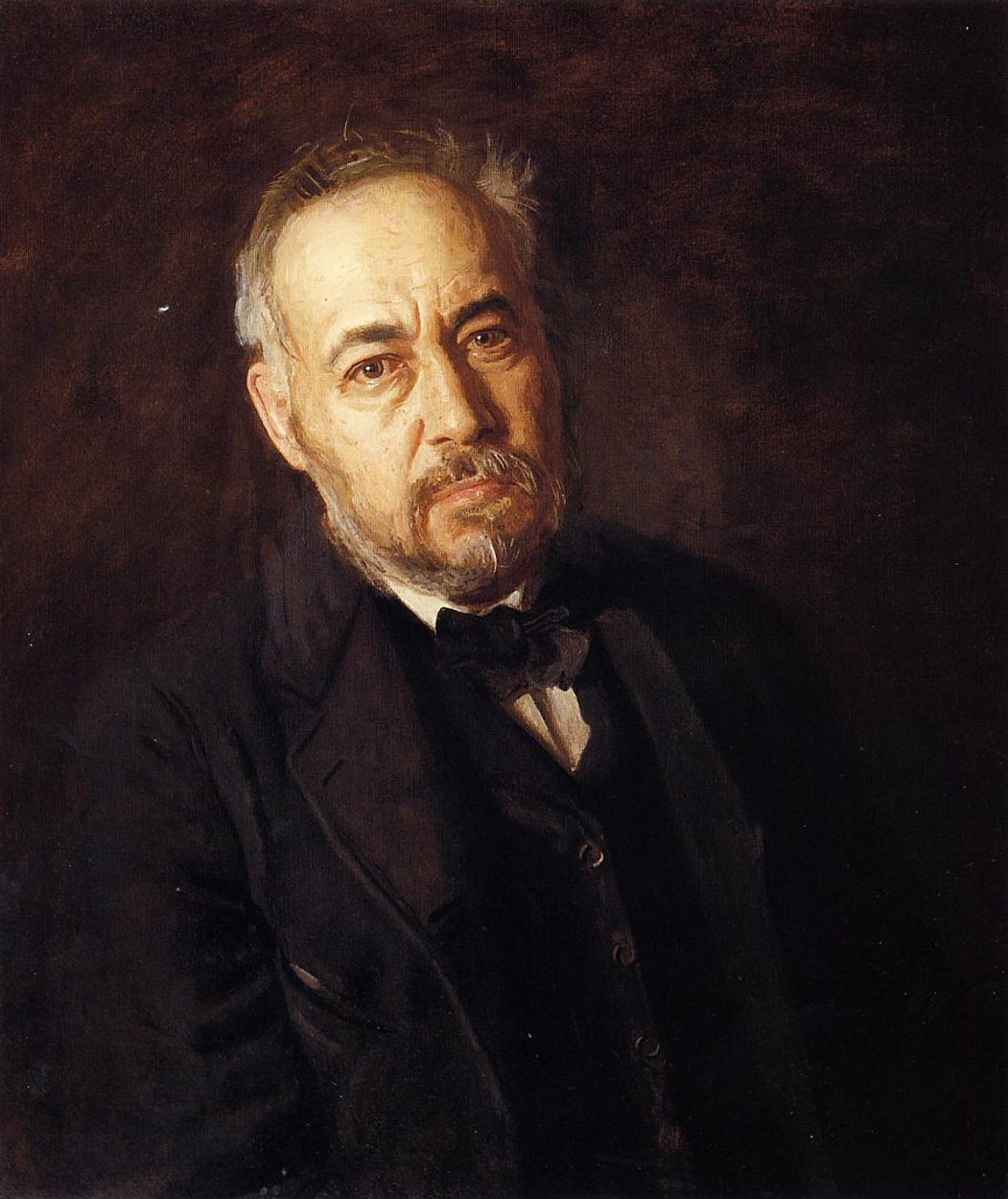
Thomas Eakins, Self-portrait, 1902

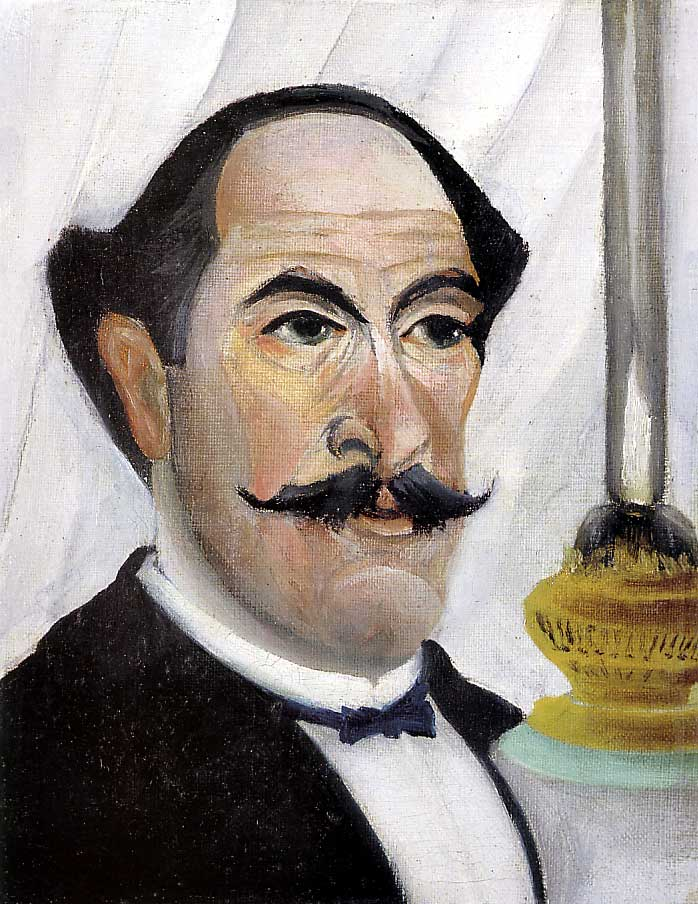
Henri Rousseau, 1903, Self-portrait of the Artist with a Lamp

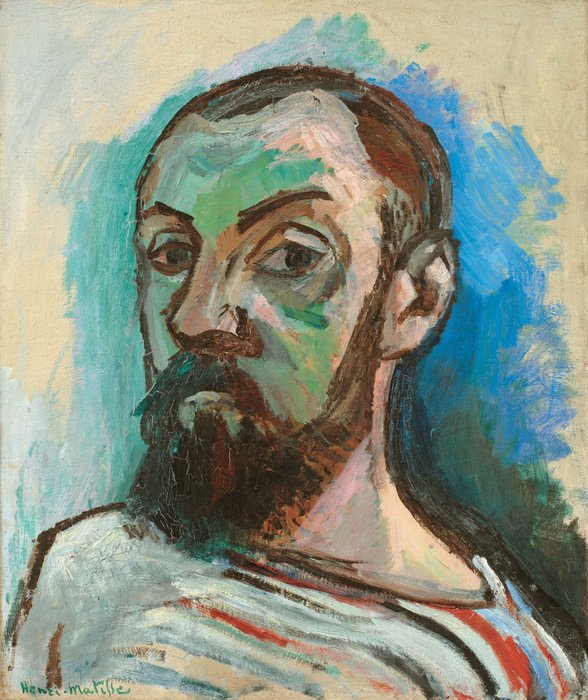
Henri Matisse, Self-Portrait in a Striped T-shirt, 1906, Statens Museum for Kunst, Copenhagen, Denmark

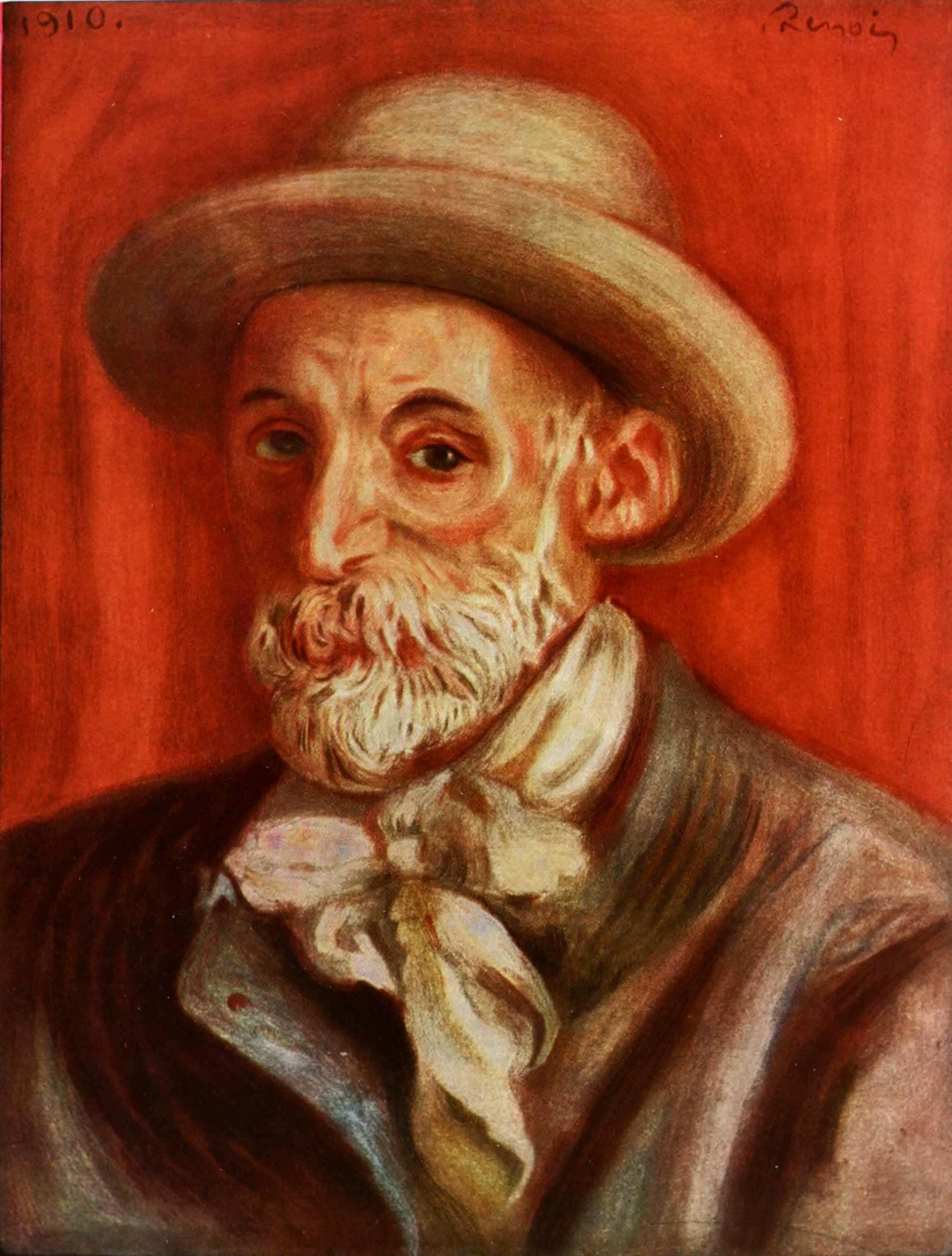
Pierre-Auguste Renoir, 1910

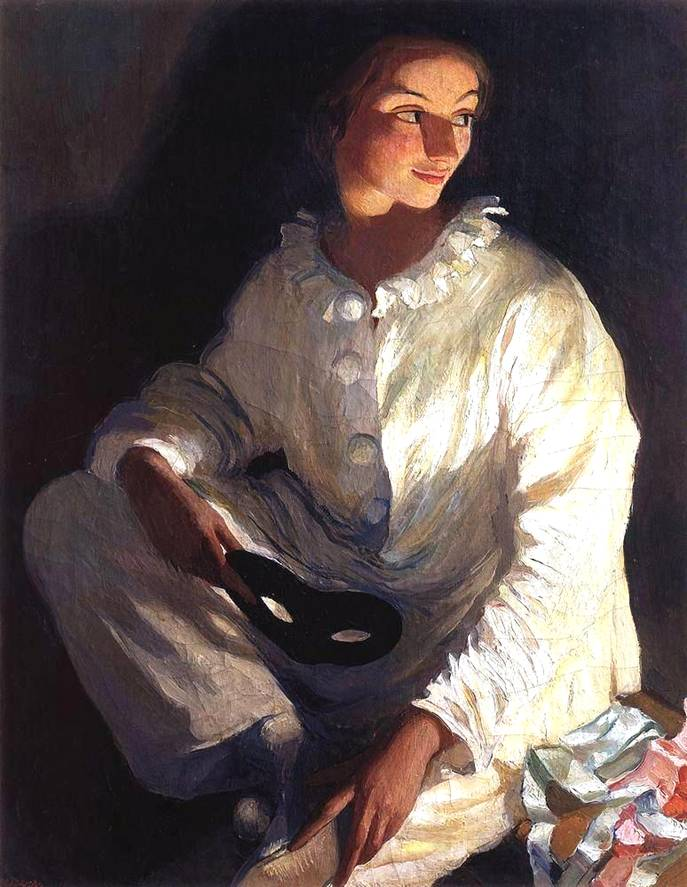
Zinaida Serebriakova, Self-portrait as Pierrot, 1911

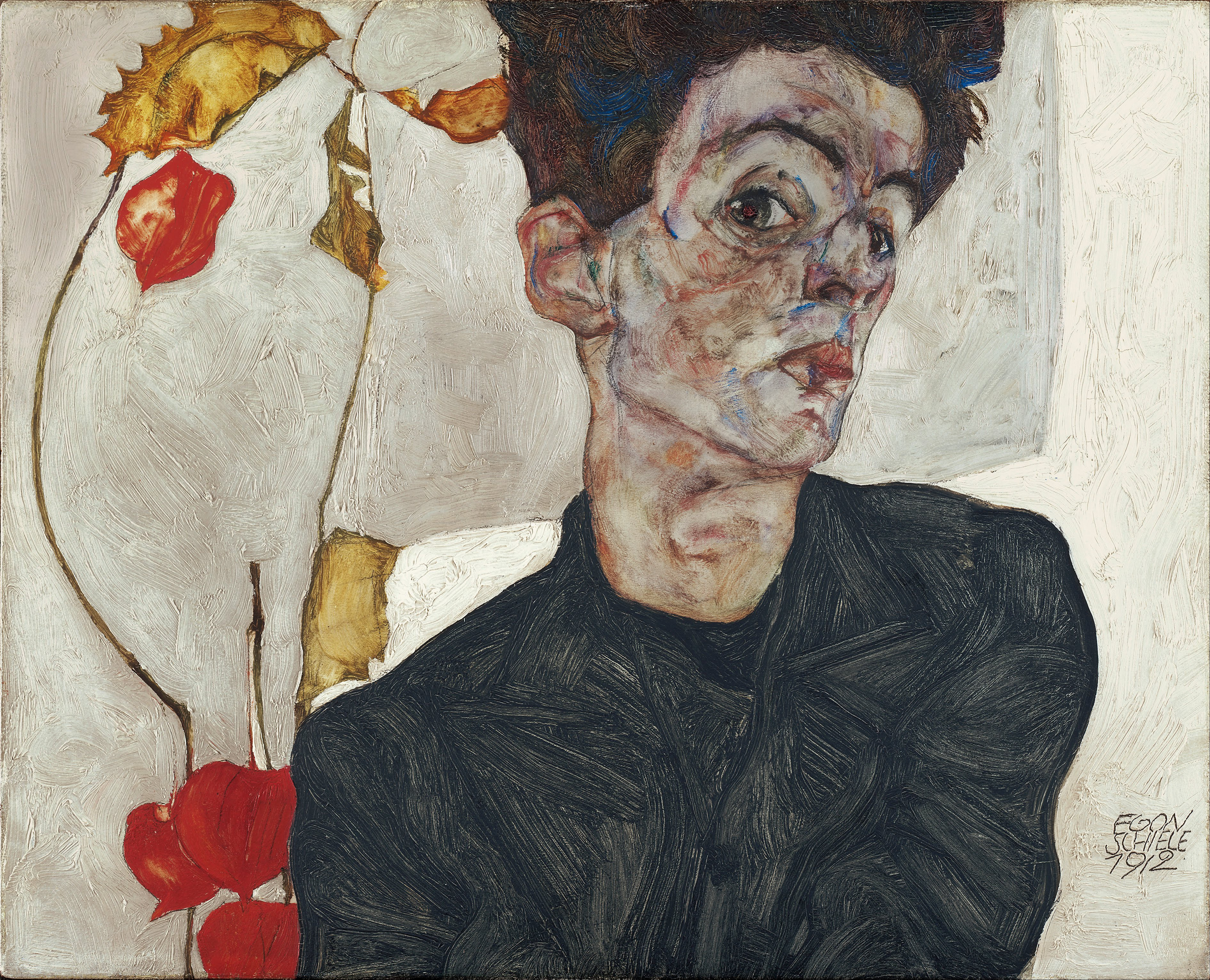
Egon Schiele, 1912

=== Photo-portraits ===
Two methods of obtaining photographic self-portraits are widespread. One is photographing a reflection in the mirror, and the other photographing one's self with the camera in an outstretched hand. Eleazar Langman photographed his reflection on the surface of a nickel-plated teapot.

Another method involves setting the camera or capture device upon a tripod, or surface. One might then set the camera's timer, or use a remote controlled shutter release.

Finally, setting up the camera, entering the scene and having an assistant release the shutter (i.e., if the presence of a cable release is unwanted in the photo) can arguably be regarded as a photographic self-portrait, as well. The speed of creating photographic self-portraits allowed for a range of images with more of a "play" atmosphere than traditional methods. One such example is Frances Benjamin Johnston's Self-Portrait, c. 1896, an image which demonstrates the photo-portrait's ability to play with gender roles.

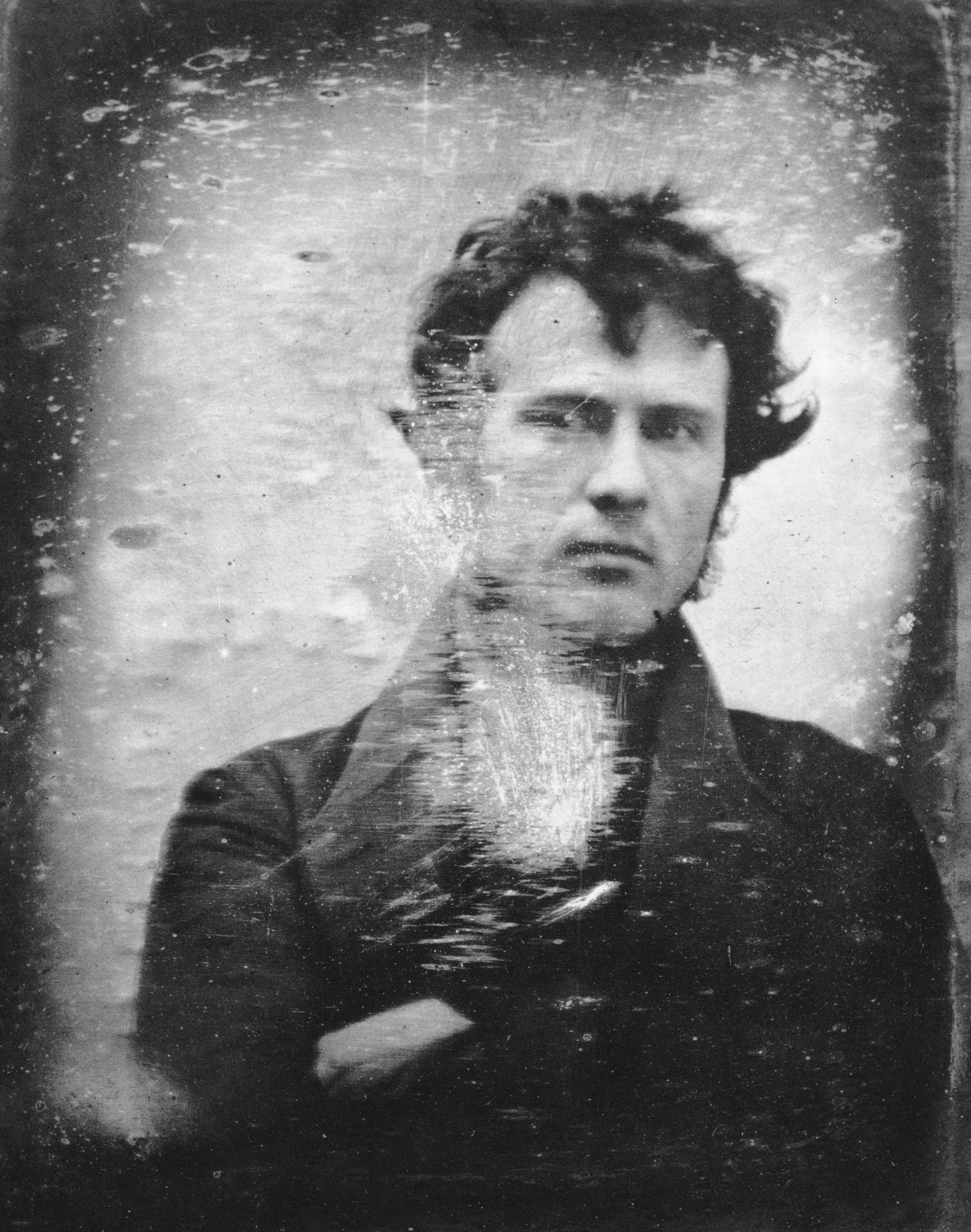
The oldest surviving photographic self-portrait by Robert Cornelius, 1839.

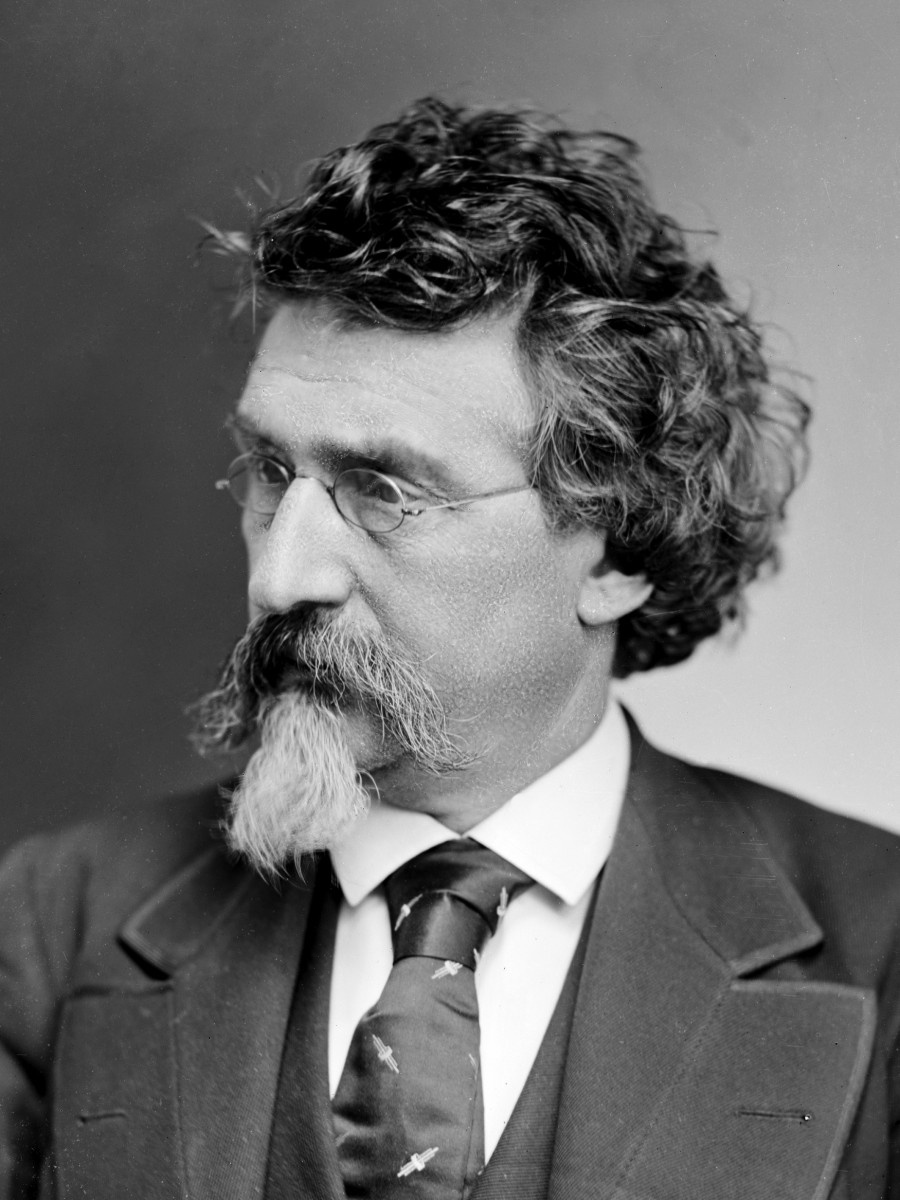
Mathew Brady, self-portrait, circa 1875

Nadar, Revolving Self Portrait, c. 1865

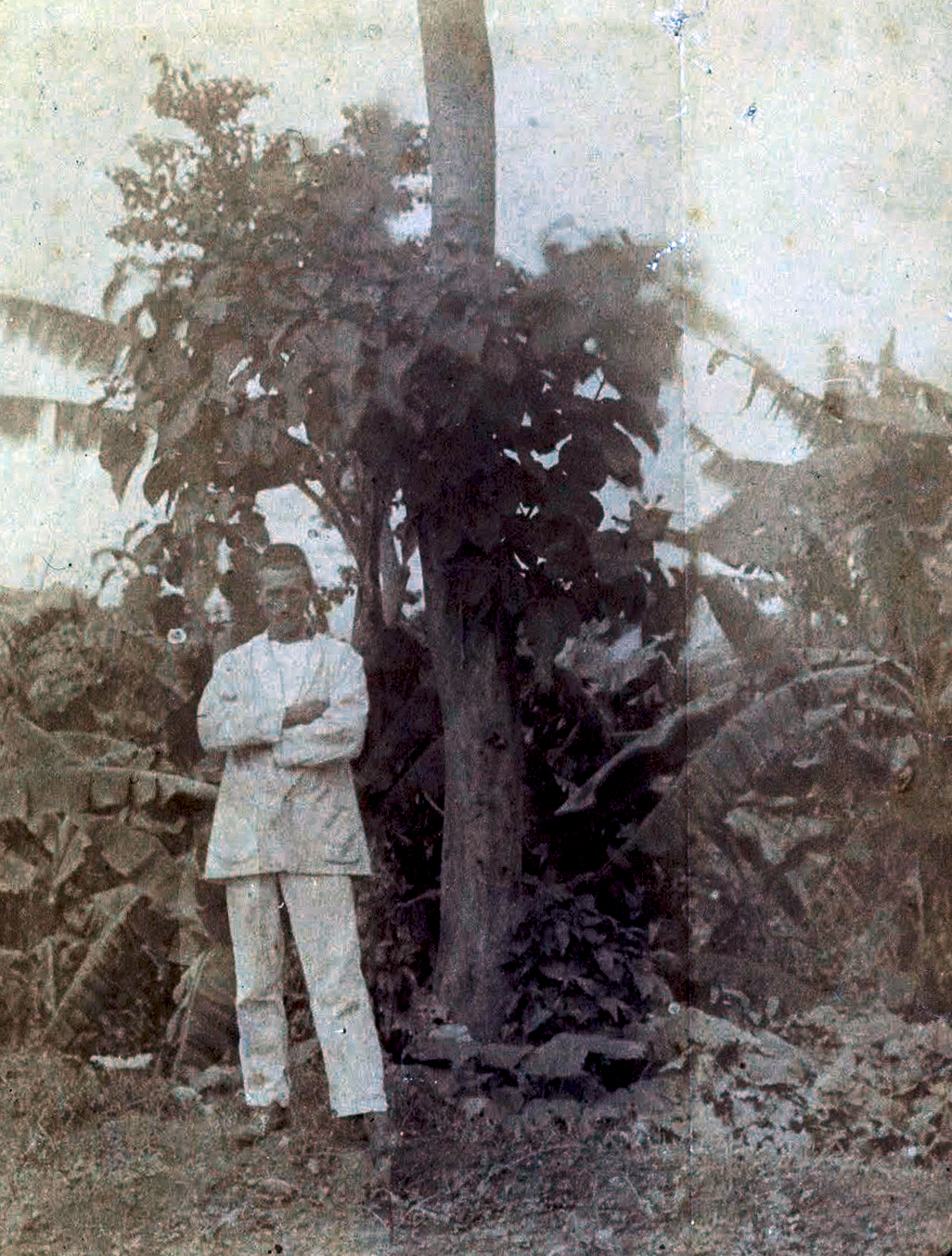
Arthur Rimbaud, Self-portrait in Harar, Ethiopia, 1883

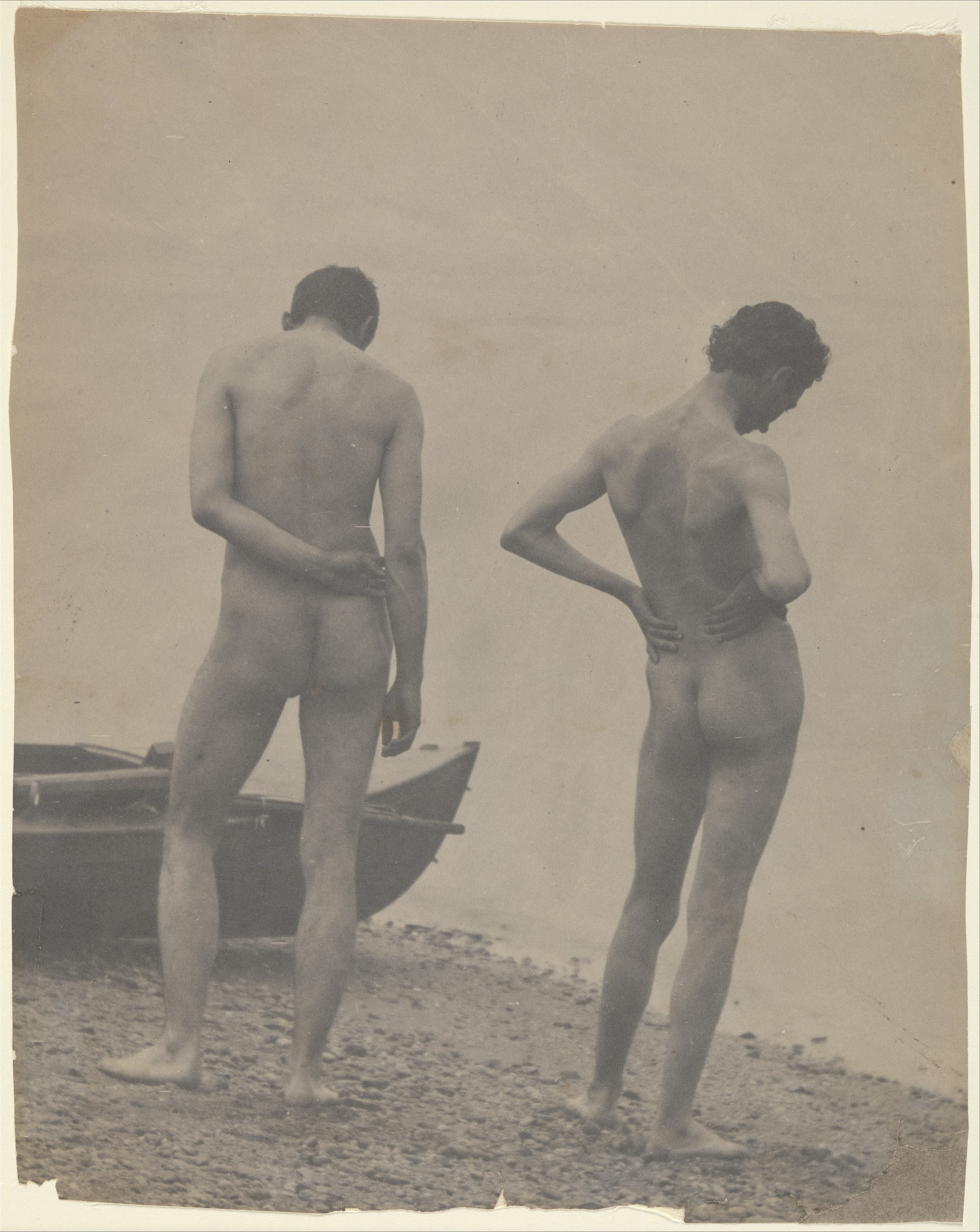
Thomas Eakins, Self-portrait with John Laurie Wallace, circa 1883

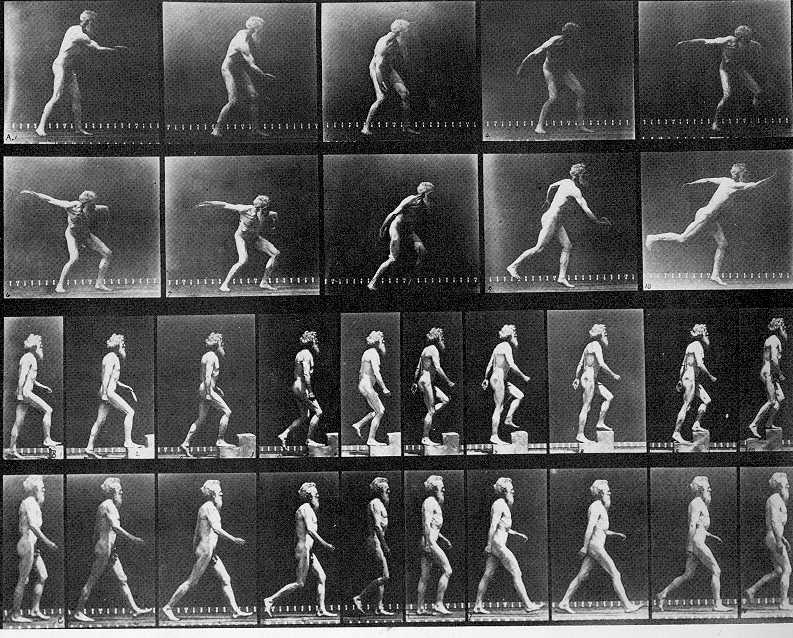
Eadweard Muybridge Self-portrait as man throwing, climbing and walking, circa 1893

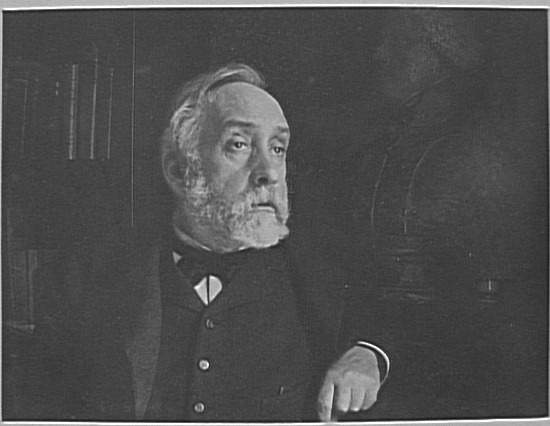
Edgar Degas, Self-portrait, 1895

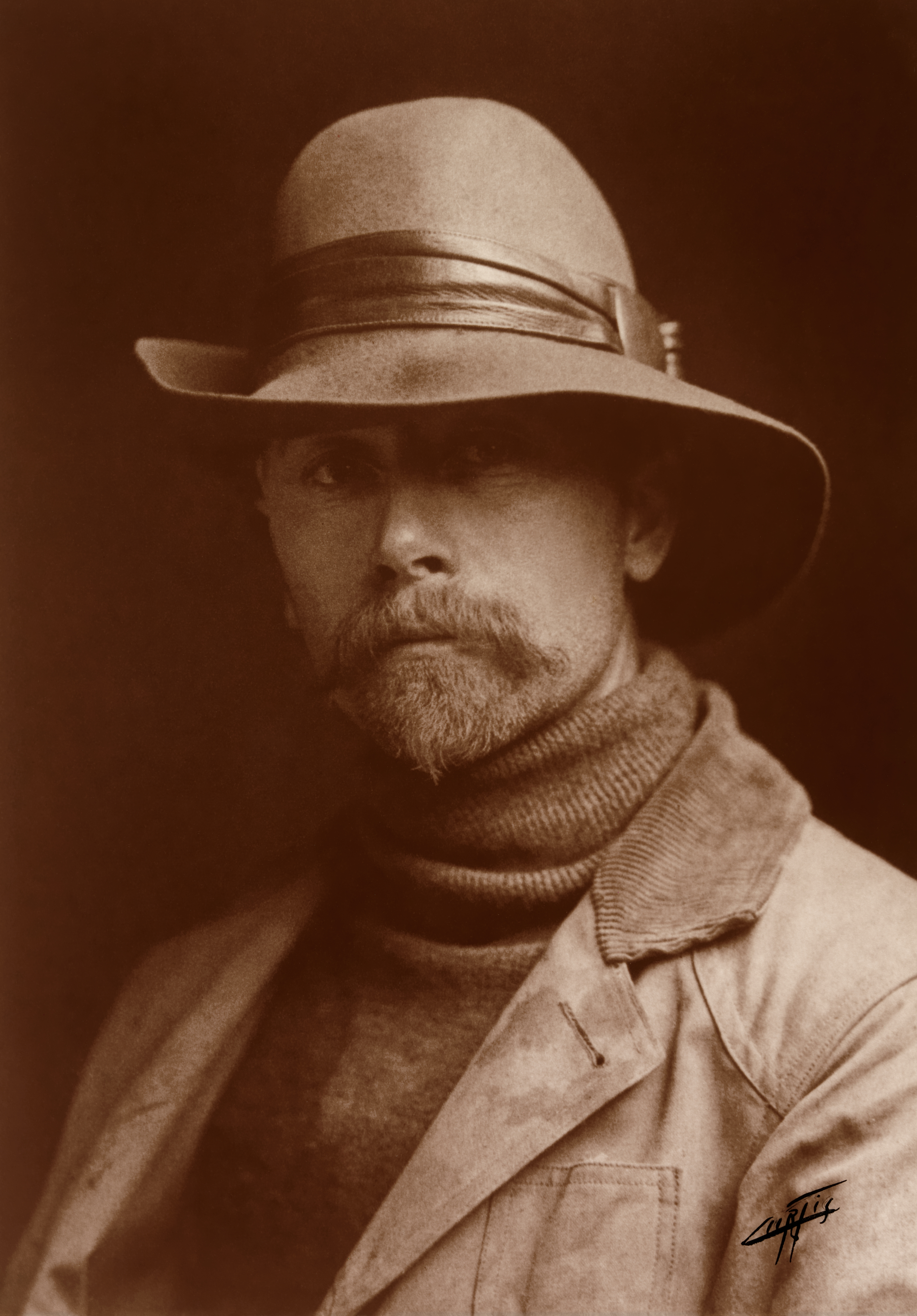
Edward S. Curtis, self-portrait, 1898

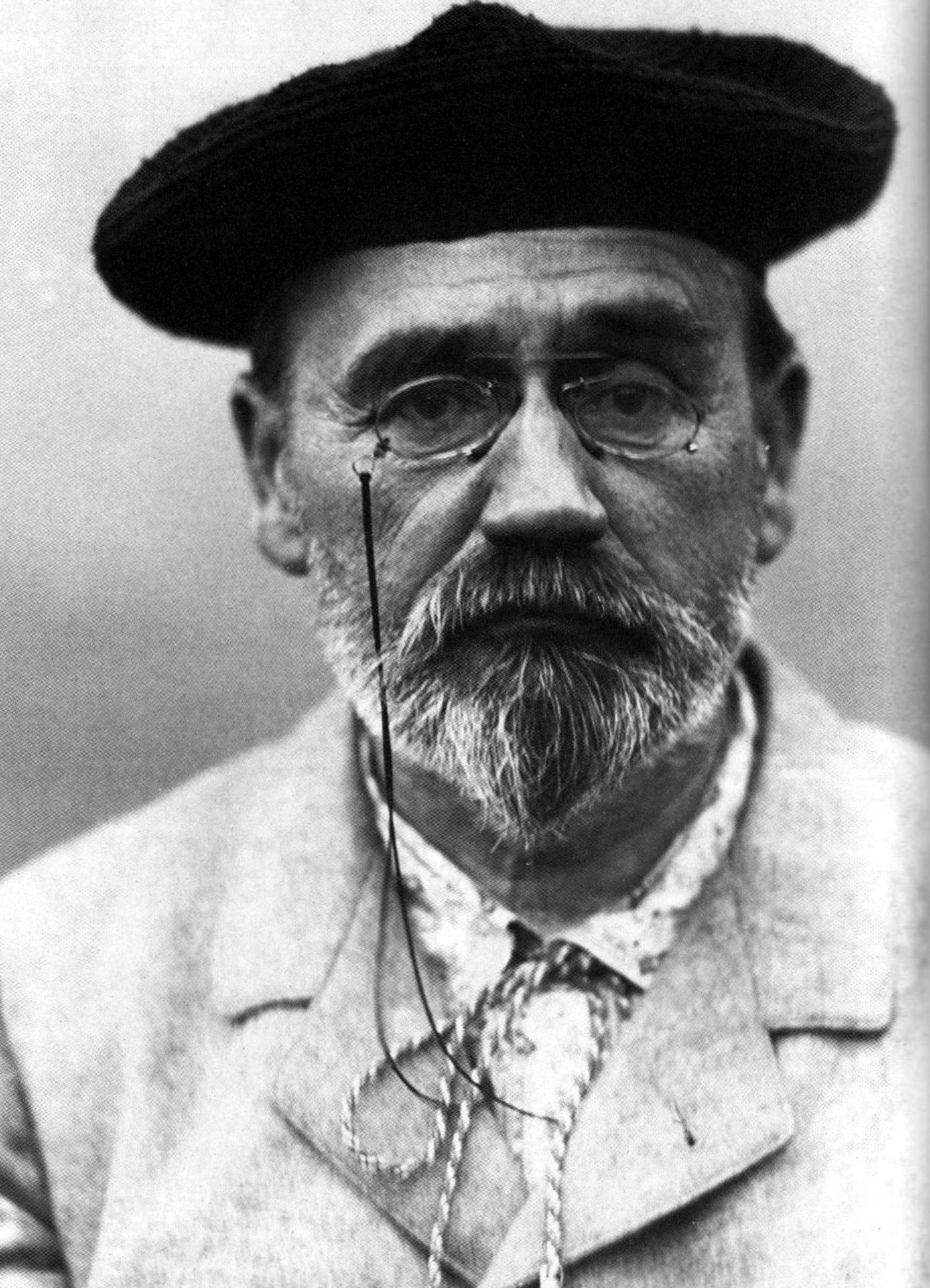
Émile Zola, self-portrait, 1902

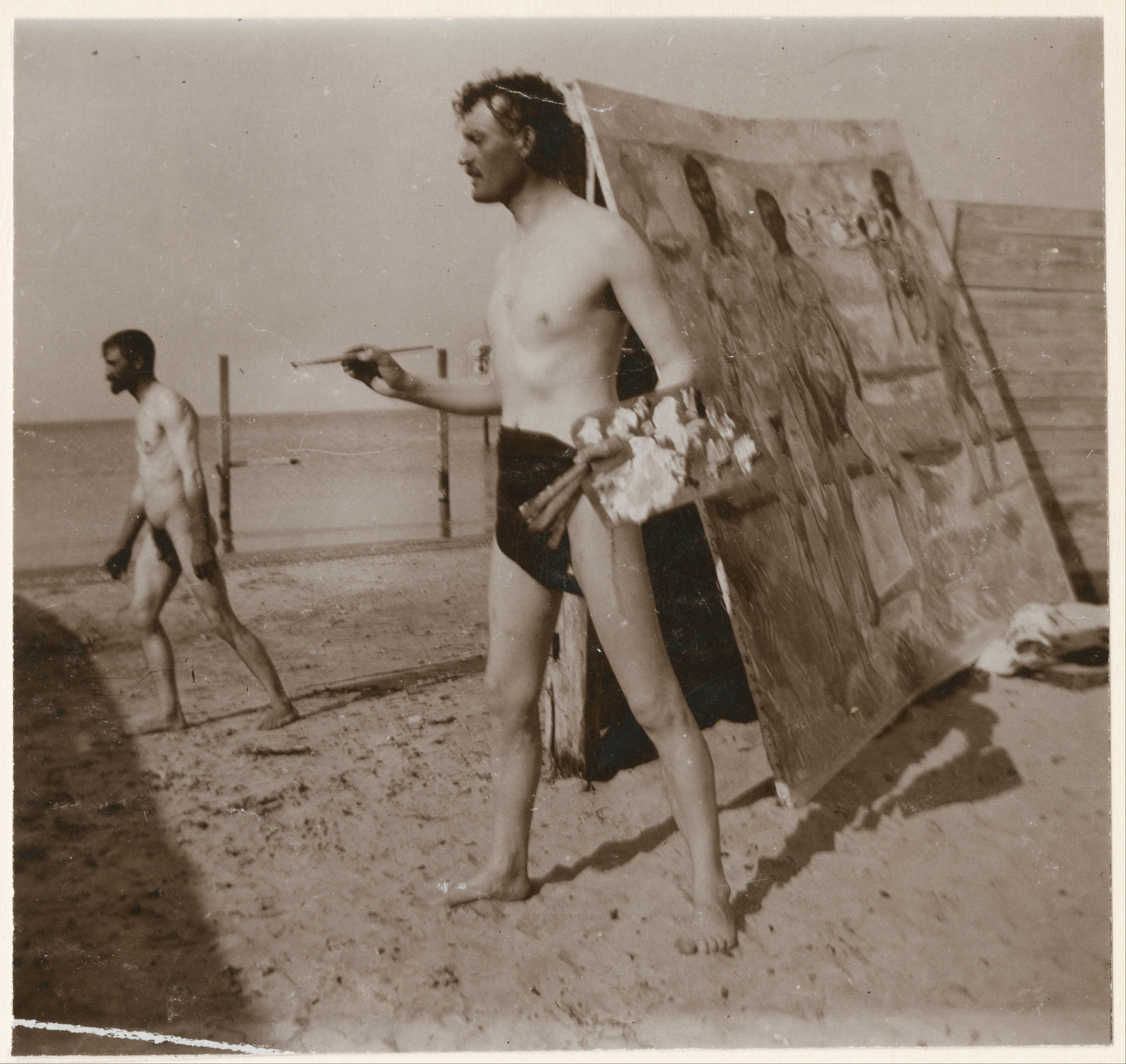
Edvard Munch, self-portrait at the beach in Warnemünde, 1907. 83 × 87 mm. Munch Museum, Oslo

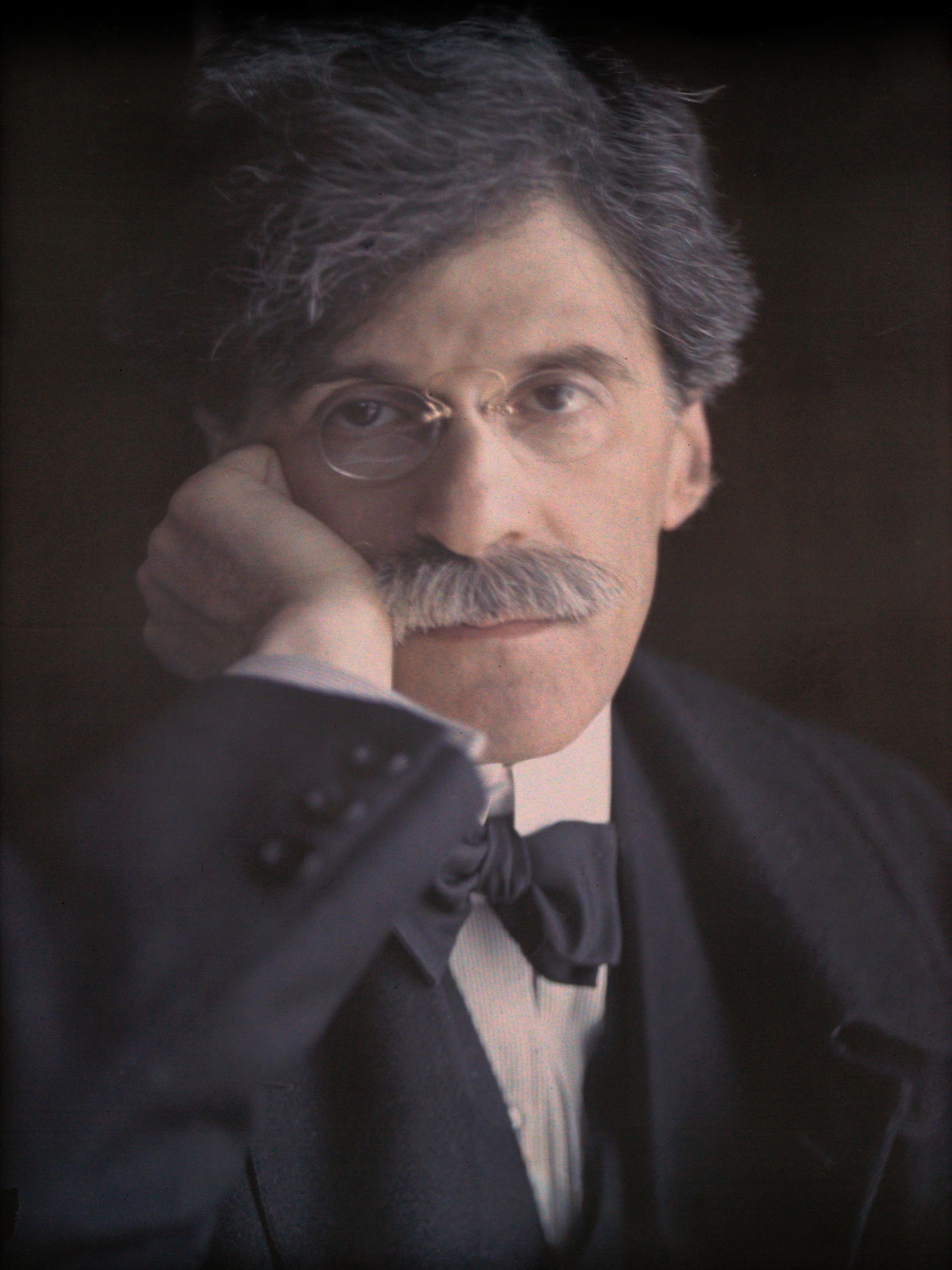
Alfred Stieglitz, self-portrait autochrome, c. 1907

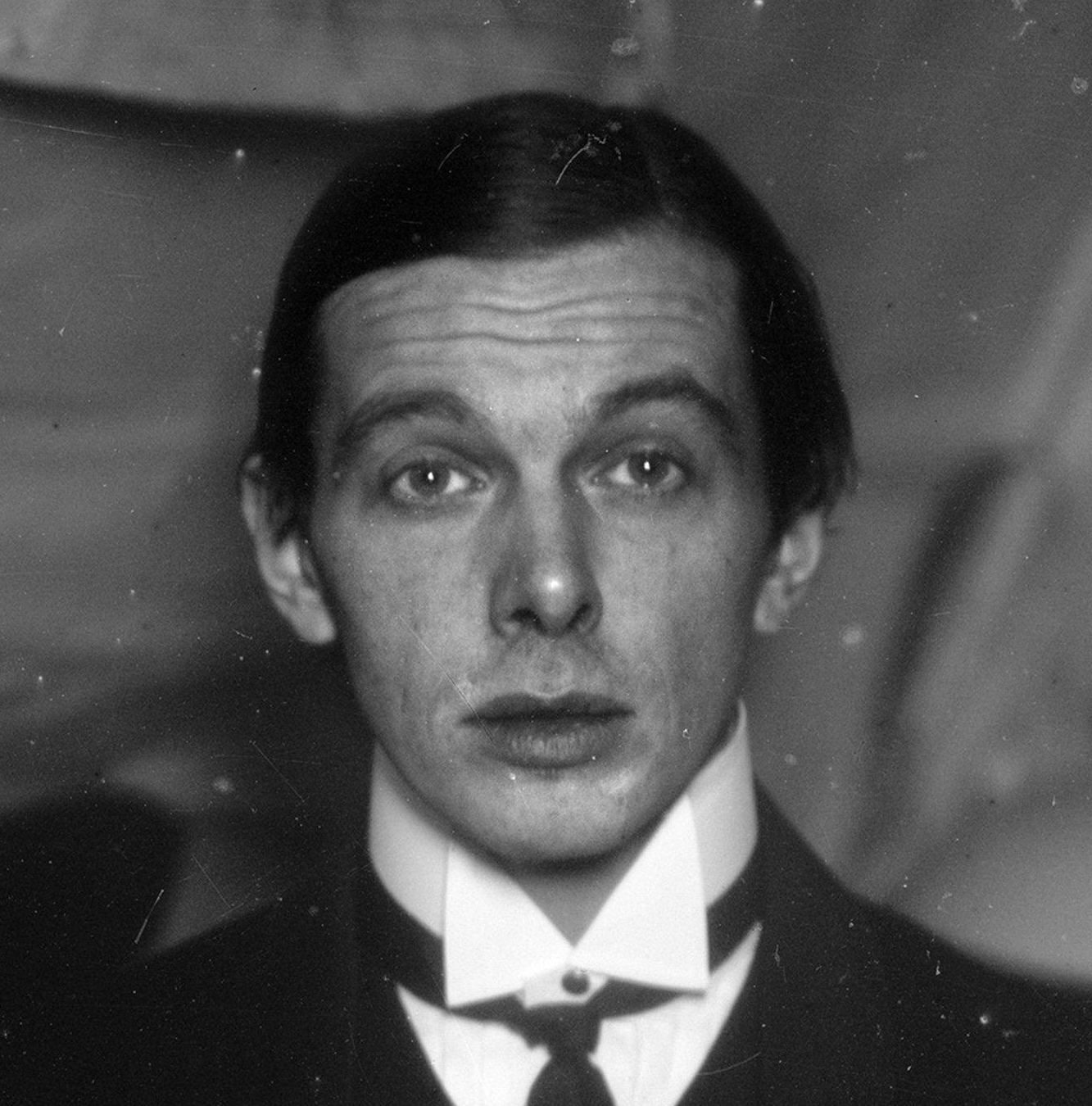
Ernst Kirchner, self-portrait, 1913/15

=== Drawings, prints and engravings ===
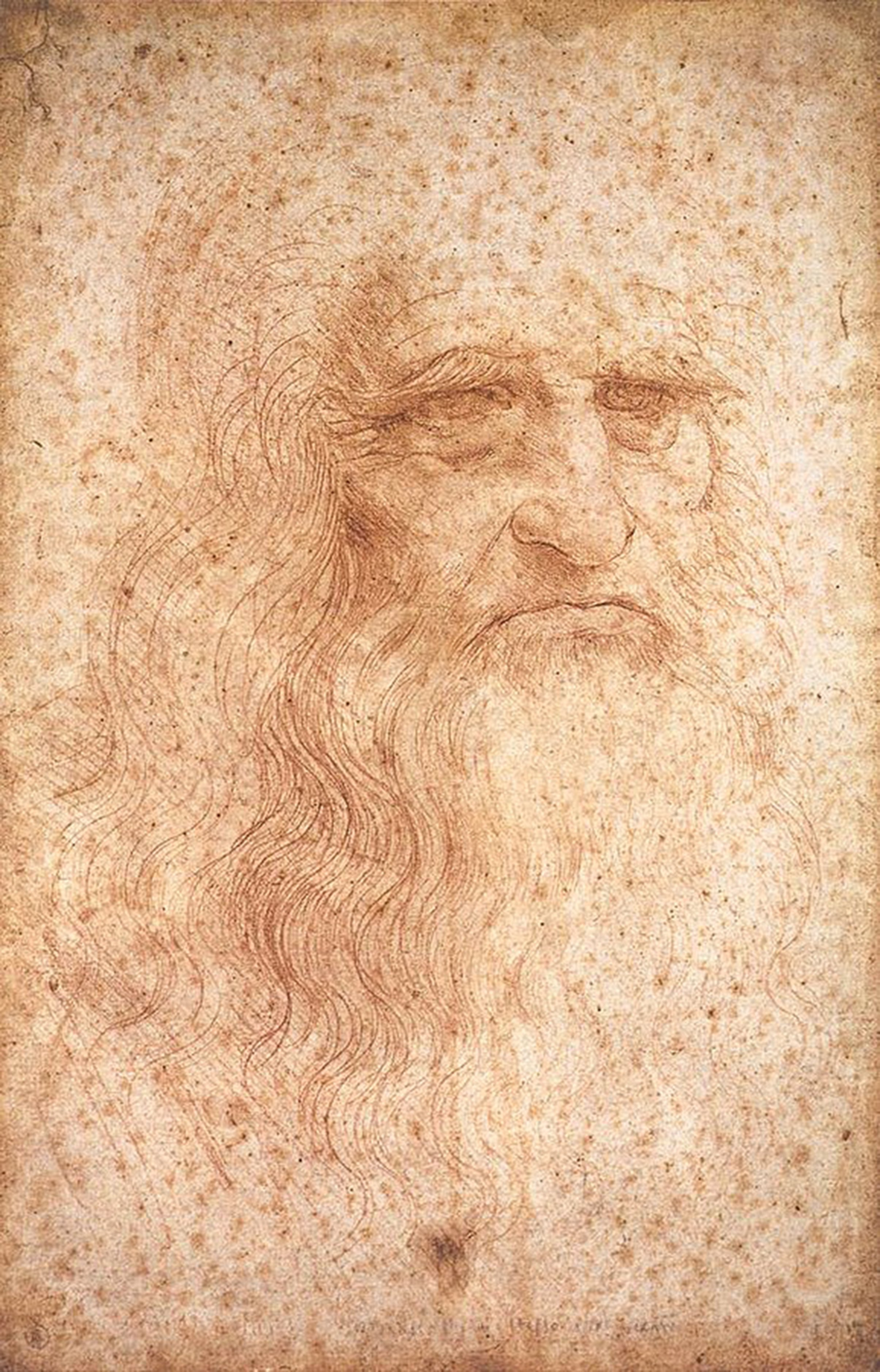
Leonardo da Vinci, Self-portrait, c. 1512 to 1515.

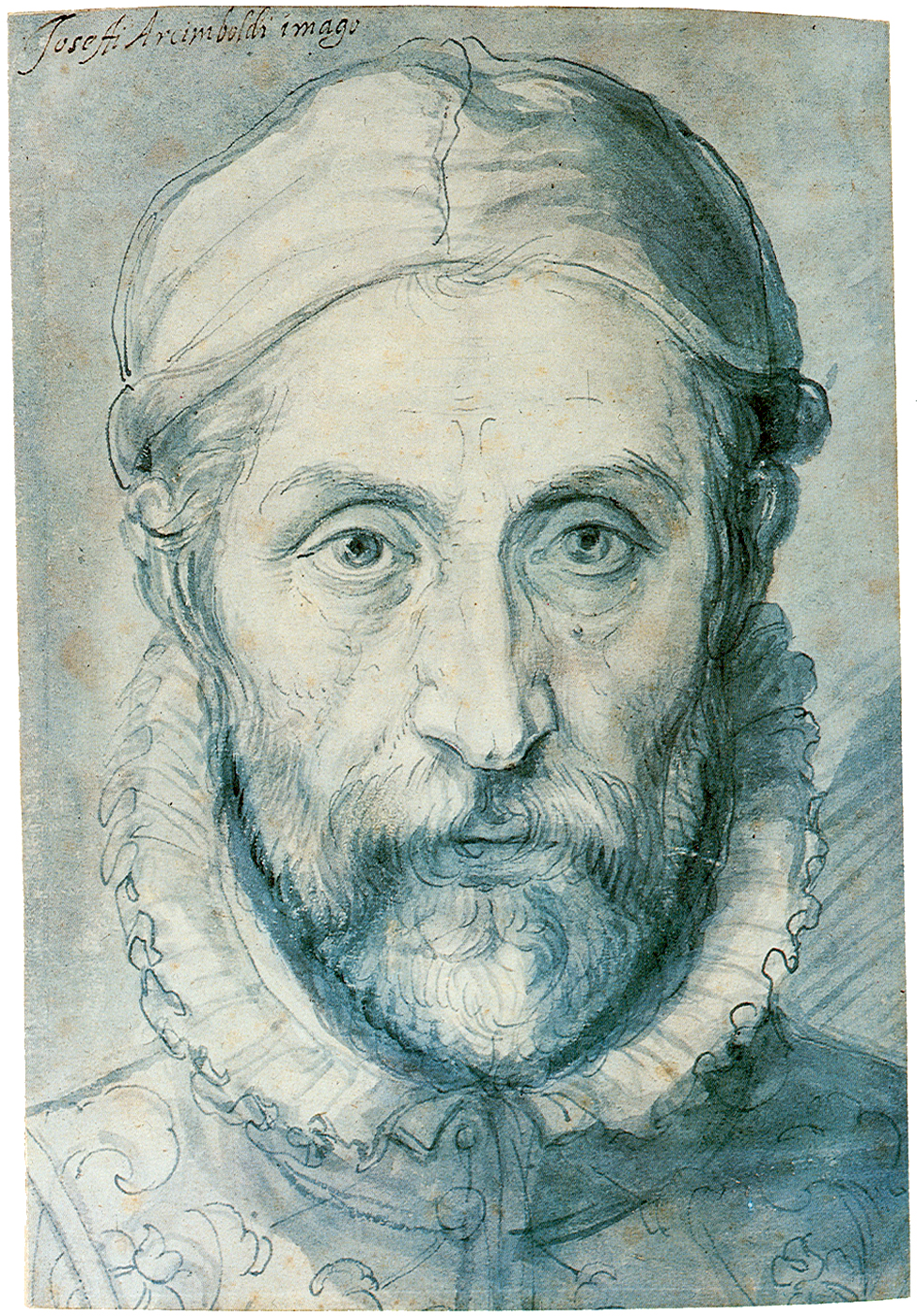
Giuseppe Arcimboldo, self portrait, 1635 and 1638

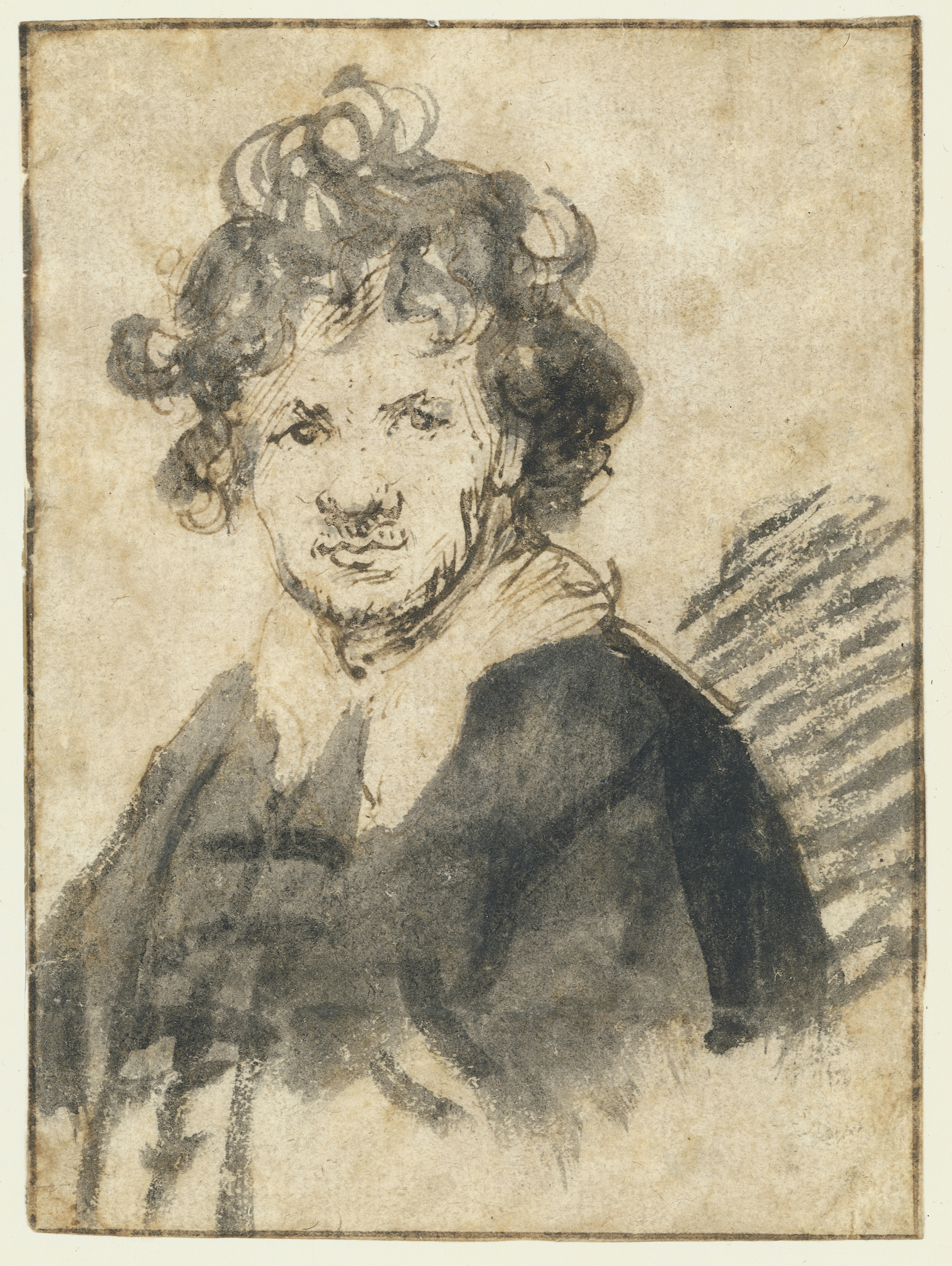
Rembrandt van Rijn, Self-portrait, pen and brush and ink on paper, c. 1628-1629

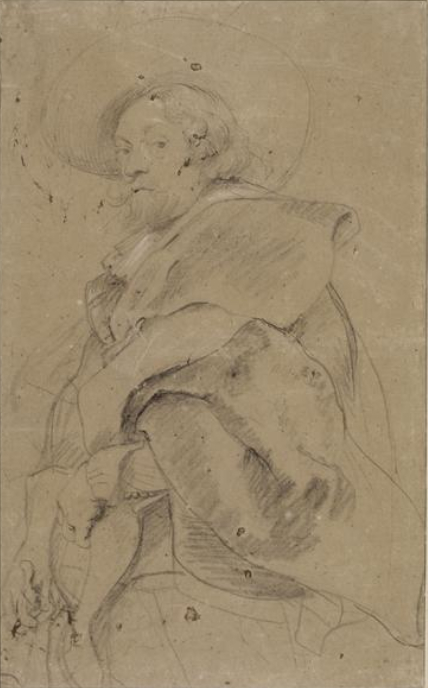
Peter Paul Rubens, Self-portrait, 1635-1638

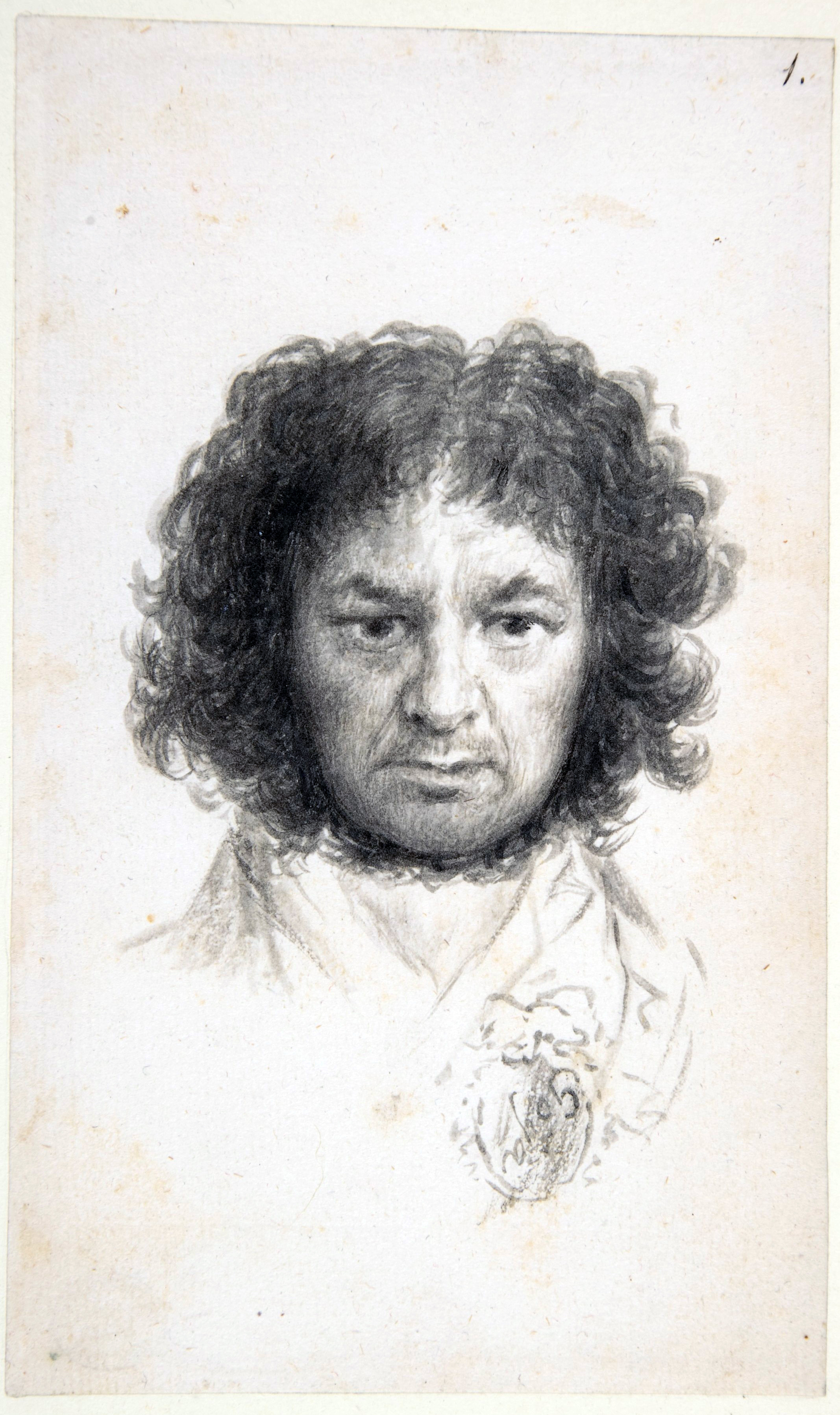
Francisco de Goya, self portrait, print, 1795

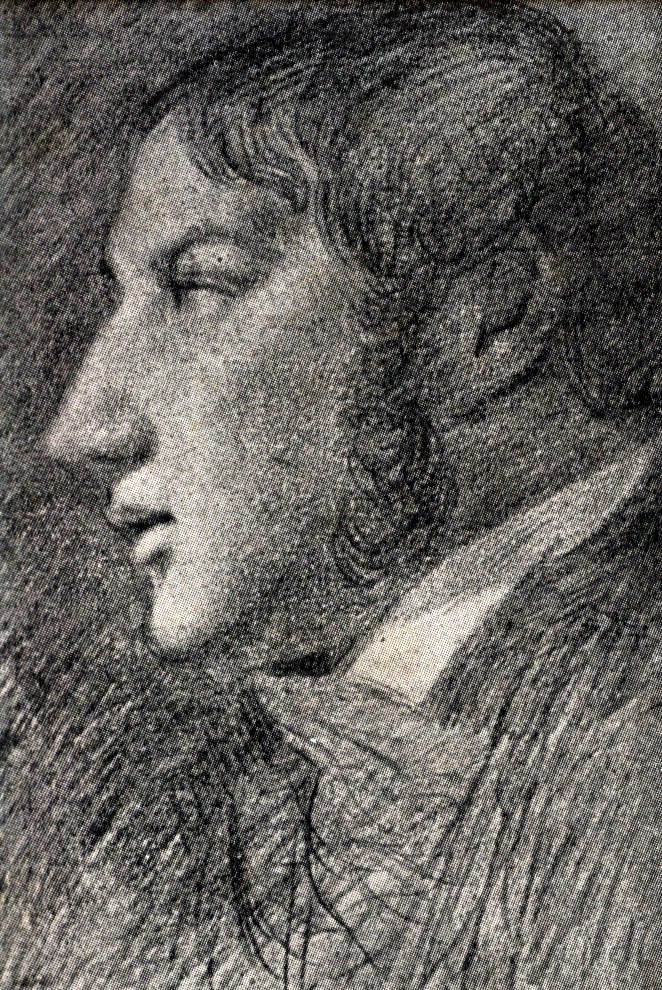
John Constable self portrait, 1806

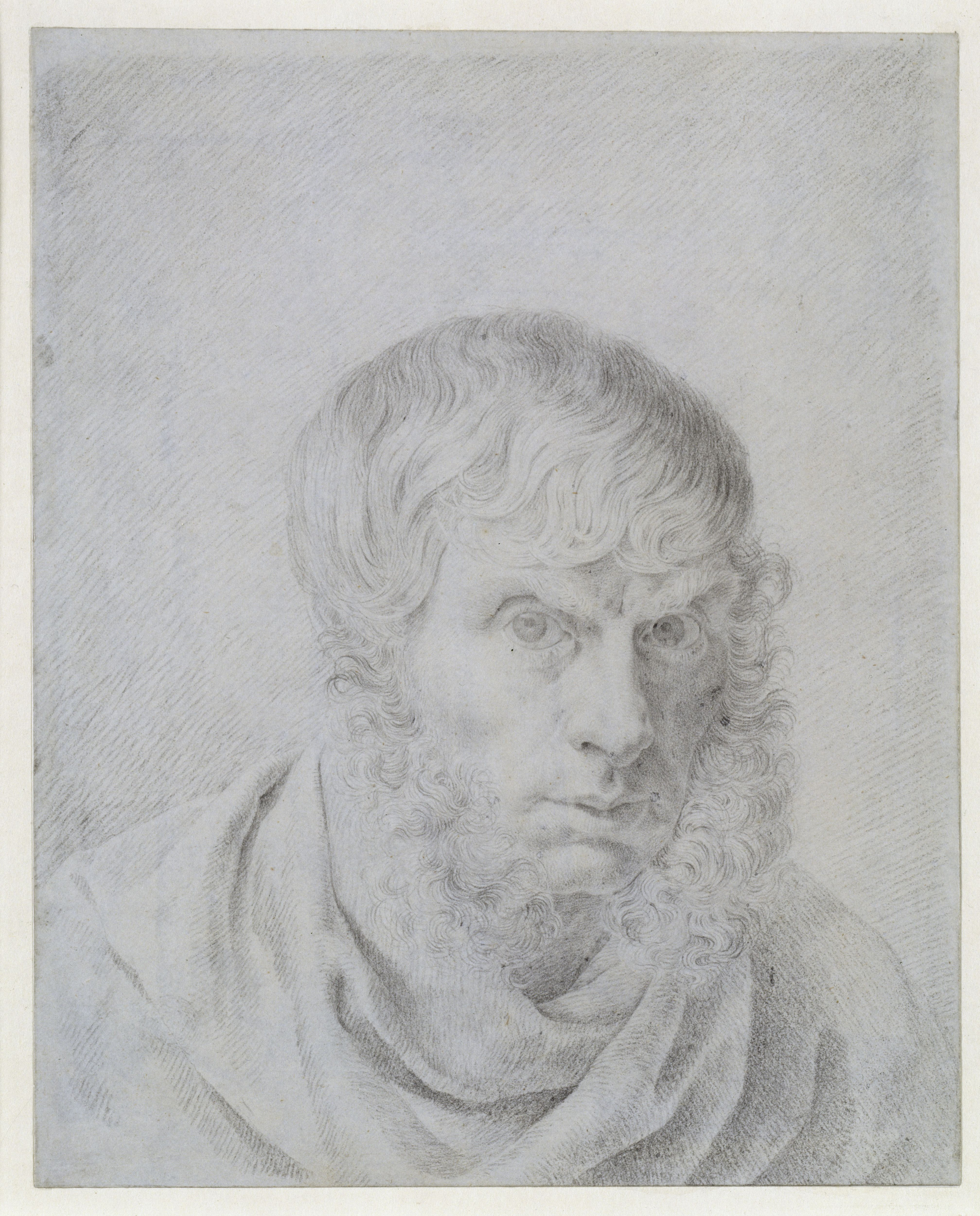
Caspar David Friedrich, self portrait, age thirty-six, 1810

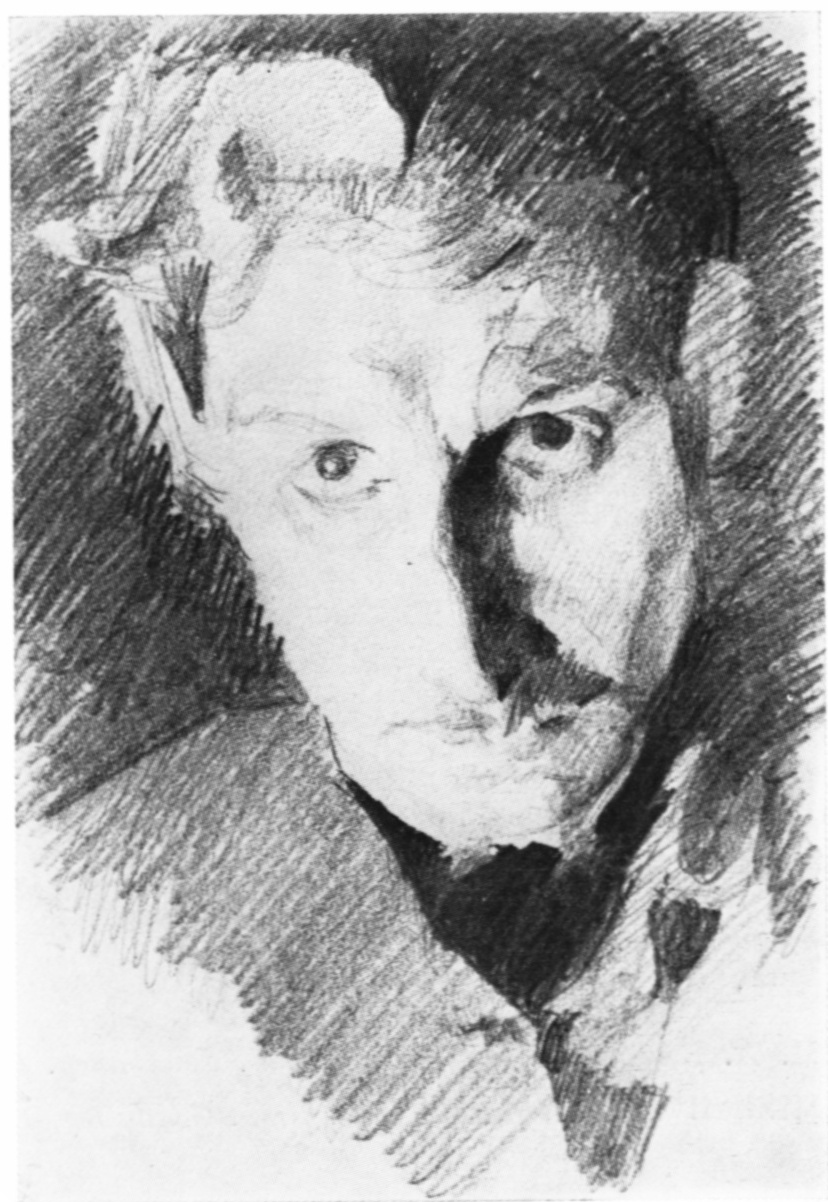
Mikhail Vrubel, self portrait, c. 1885

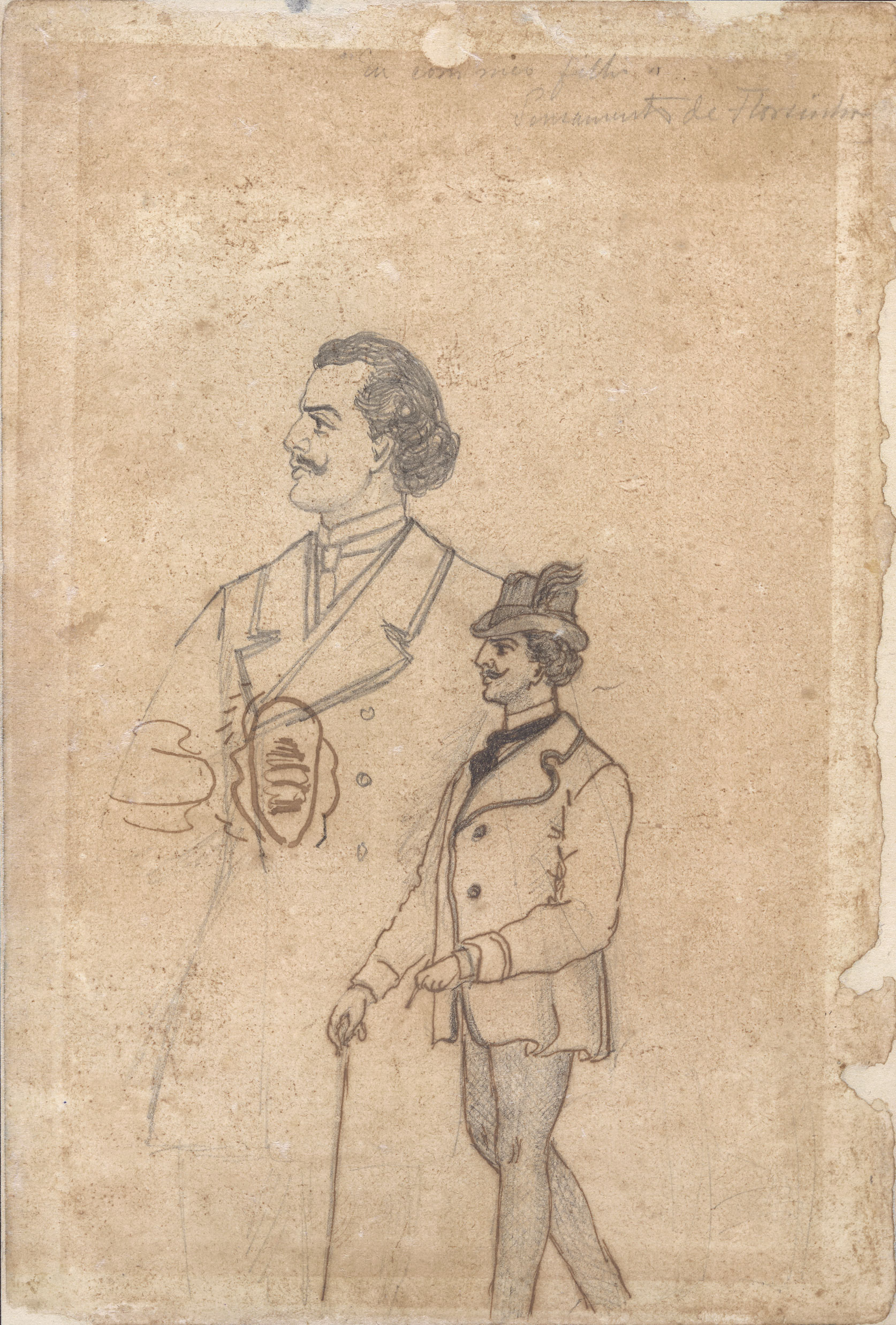
Castro Alves, self portrait, 18--.

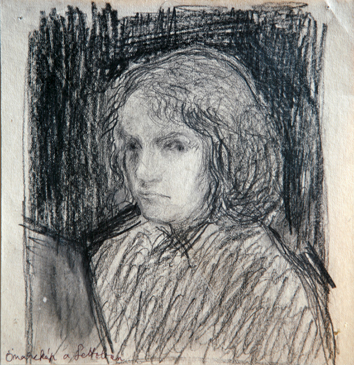
Ilka Gedő, Self-Portrait in the Budapest Ghetto, 1944, Hungarian Jewish Museum

== See also ==
- 3D selfie
- Hockney–Falco thesis
- Portrait
- Portrait of a Young Man with a Golden Chain
- Portrait painting
- Self timer
- Selfie
- Self-portraits by Rembrandt
- Self-portraits by Vincent van Gogh
- The Portrait Now
